= Ver-o-Peso Dock =

Municipal fair in Belém, Pará, Brazil

- Doca do Ver-o-Peso
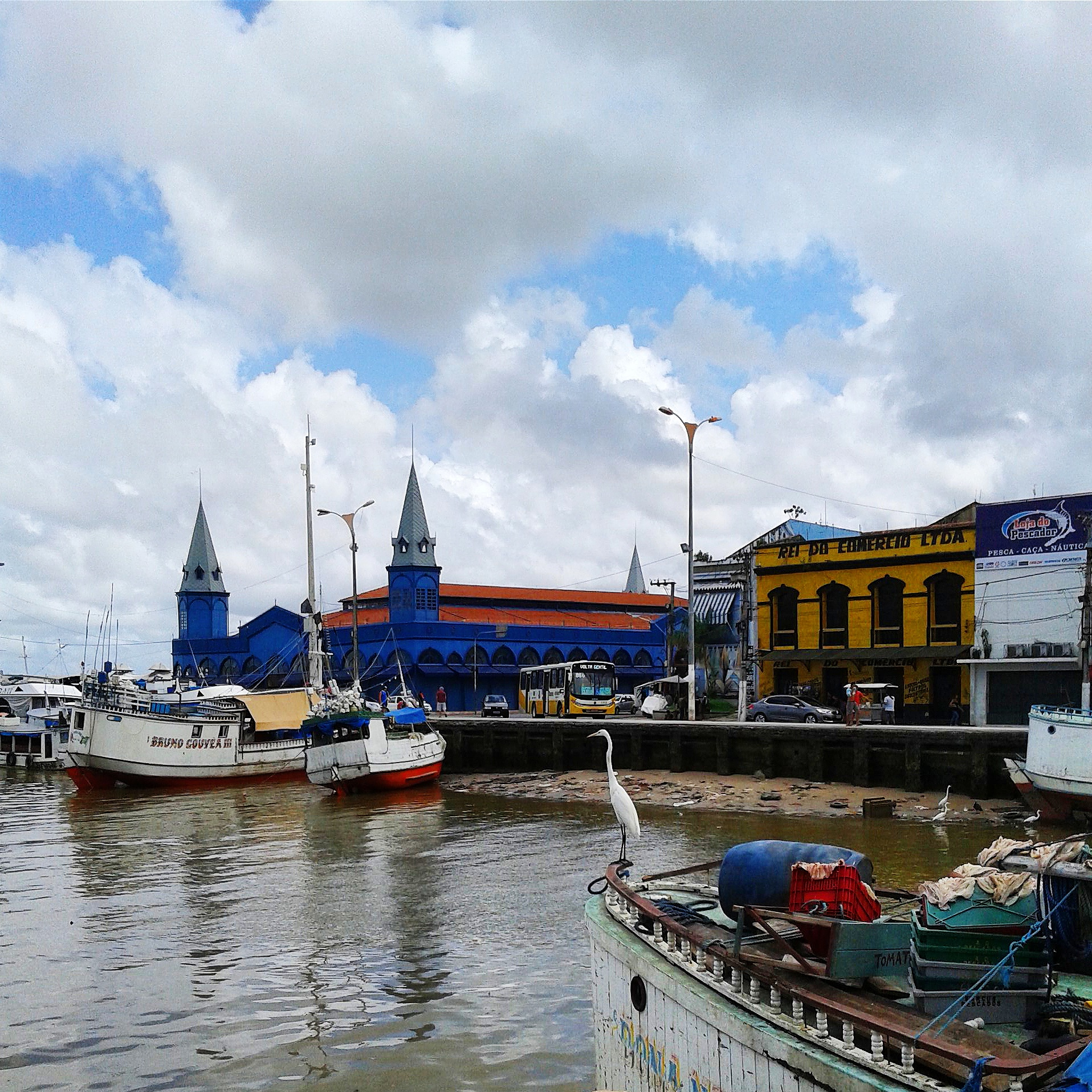
- Ver-o-Peso architectural and landscape complex
- Interactive map of Ver-o-Peso Dock
- Type: Dock; Open-air market
- Location: Belém, Pará; Brazil
- Coordinates: 01°27′12″S 48°30′13″W

Ver-o-Peso Dock (Portuguese: Doca do Ver-o-Peso) is an open-air municipal public fish market and a small port area that belongs to the Ver-o-Peso Complex, located on the shores of Guajará Bay in the Cidade Velha neighborhood, in the city of Belém, the capital of Pará, Brazil. The dock is surrounded by the Clock Square, the Açaí Fair and the Ver-o-Peso Market.

== History ==
In 1803, under the government of D. Marcos de Noronha e Brito, Count of Arcos, the Igarapé do Piri, a beach area on the edge of the Campina neighborhood, located next to the Meat Market, it was filled in to support Belém's urban development. The estuary was transformed into the Ver-o-Peso Dock and the Pedra do Peixe, where the Casa de Haver-o-Peso activities continued, along with an informal fishermen's market. In 1901, one of the city's first wide thoroughfares, Boulevard Castilhos França, was designed with an art nouveau influence. These works were the result of Belém's enrichment at the start of the rubber cycle.

== Historical heritage ==
The dock is a part of the architectural and landscape complex of Ver-o-Peso, which was listed as a historical heritage by the National Historic and Artistic Heritage Institute (IPHAN) in 1977. The complex covers an area of 35,000 square meters and includes a series of historic buildings such as the Boulevard Castilhos França, the Meat Market, the Ver-o-Peso Market, the Fisherman's Square, the Açaí Fair, the Ladeira do Castelo and the Solar da Beira.

The dock is located at the Portugal Avenue, where there are also other protected structures such as the Siqueira Campos Square, the Antônio Lemos Palace (Blue Palace), the Lauro Sodré Palace (Government Palace) and the Solar Barão de Guajará.

== See also ==
- Ver-o-Peso Complex
- Feliz Lusitânia
