= Ver-o-Peso Complex =

Architectural complex in Belém, Pará, Brazil

Coordinates: 1°27′13″S 48°30′13″W

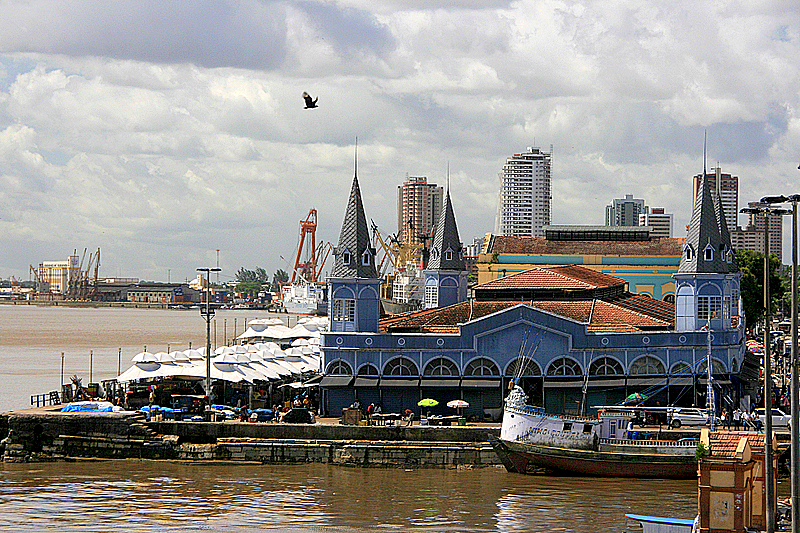
View of the Ver-o-Peso Market on the shores of Guajará Bay.

The Ver-o-Peso Complex (Portuguese: Complexo do Ver-o-Peso) is an architectural and landscape site located on Boulevard Castilhos França, in the Cidade Velha neighborhood, Belém, capital of Pará. It began to be formed in 1625 with the construction of the Casa de Haver-o-Peso commercial tax office, and in 1977 it was listed as a heritage site by the National Institute of Historic and Artistic Heritage (IPHAN). The complex covers an area of 35,000 m^{2} and includes several historic buildings in line with the French art nouveau trend of the Belle Époque, such as:

- Boulevard Castilhos França: designed under the art nouveau influence, it was one of the first wide roads in the city;
- Ver-o-Peso Market: the city's greatest architectural attraction; it replaced the Casa de Haver-o-Peso, which was demolished in 1899. It was the first municipal fish market in Belém, and elected one of the Seven Wonders of Brazil;
- Meat Market: also known as the Francisco Bolonha Municipal Meat Market or Bolonha Market, it was the first municipal meat market in Belém;
- Siqueira Campos Square/Clock Square: built in 1930, its iron tower features a clock donated by the intendant Antonio Faciola and brought from England;
- Ver-o-Peso Dock: free public fish market;
- Açaí Fair: an open-air market located behind the Forte do Presépio that supplies the city with the açaí grown on the region's islands;
- Ladeira do Castelo: the first street in Belém. It is located next to the Forte do Presépio and connects the Açaí Fair to Largo da Sé;
- Solar da Beira: a public structure built in the neoclassical style. In 1985 it was transformed into a restaurant and events venue;
- Dom Pedro II Square: first square built in the city;

== History ==
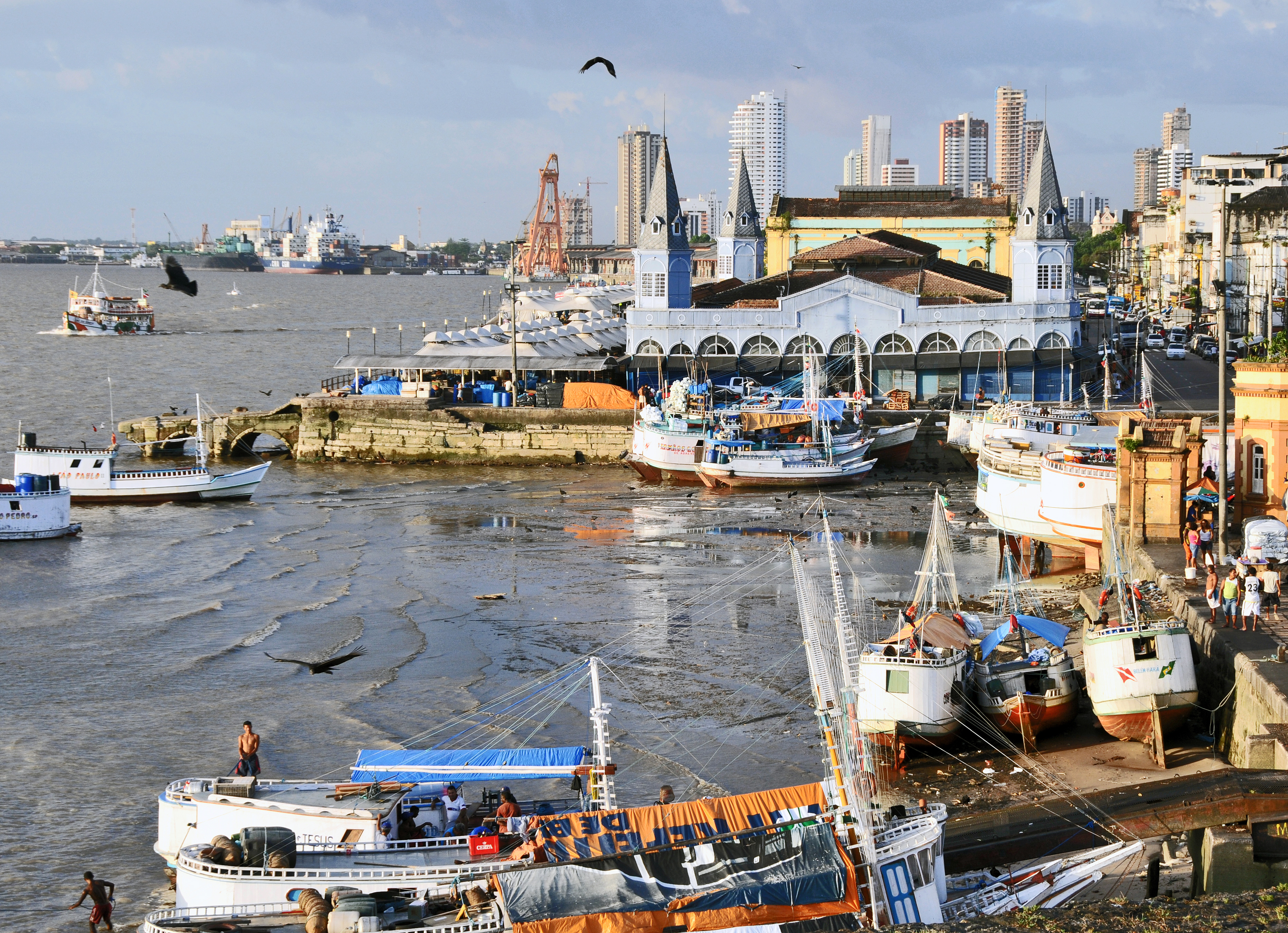
Fishing port and Ver-o-Peso Market.

Strategically positioned at the mouth of the Amazon River, Belém was the region's largest trading post for products extracted from the Amazon area and meat from the herds on Marajó Island destined for local and international markets, besides being the point of arrival for European products. In 1625, in the area of the Igarapé do Piri (currently the Ver-o-Peso Market), the Portuguese set up the Casa de Haver-o-Peso commercial tax office to control the weight and collect taxes on the products brought to Belém.

In 1803, under the government of Dom Marcos de Noronha e Brito, Count of Arcos, the Igarapé do Piri was landfilled to support Belém's urban development. The river mouth was transformed into the Ver-o-Peso Dock and the Pedra do Peixe, made from English lioz stone, where the activities of the tax office were conducted.

Although the city was affected by the Cabanagem, the Casa de Haver-o-Peso operated until October 1839, when President Bernardo de Sousa Franco abolished the commercial tax office and the property was leased out for the sale of fresh fish, which lasted until 1847, when the contract ended and the Casa de Haver-o-Peso was demolished.

In 1855, during the rubber cycle, the city's commercial importance increased, especially on the international stage. New urban changes took place: the shore of Guajará Bay was landfilled and important buildings were constructed in the European eclectic style, influenced by art nouveau, including the Meat Market (1867), the Antônio Lemos Palace (1873) and the Theatro da Paz (1878).

In 1897, the company La Rocque Pinto & Cia won the public auction for the construction of the Municipal Fish Market (or Iron Market, as the Ver-o-Peso was initially known), next to the Meat Market, under the authorization of Municipal Law no. 173. Designed by Henrique La Rocque, the Ver-o-Peso began to be built in 1899; the 1,197m² dodecagon-shaped building was inaugurated in 1901. Its veille-montaine zinc metal structure was brought by river from England and New York, in line with the French art nouveau aesthetic trend of the Belle Époque. The Meat Market was also expanded during this period.

== See also ==
- Ver-o-Peso Market
- Forte do Presépio
- Açai Fair
- Feliz Lusitânia
- History of Belém
- Culture and tourism in Belém
