= Meat Market, Belém =

Street market in Belém, Pará, Brazil

Meat Market
- Mercado da Carne
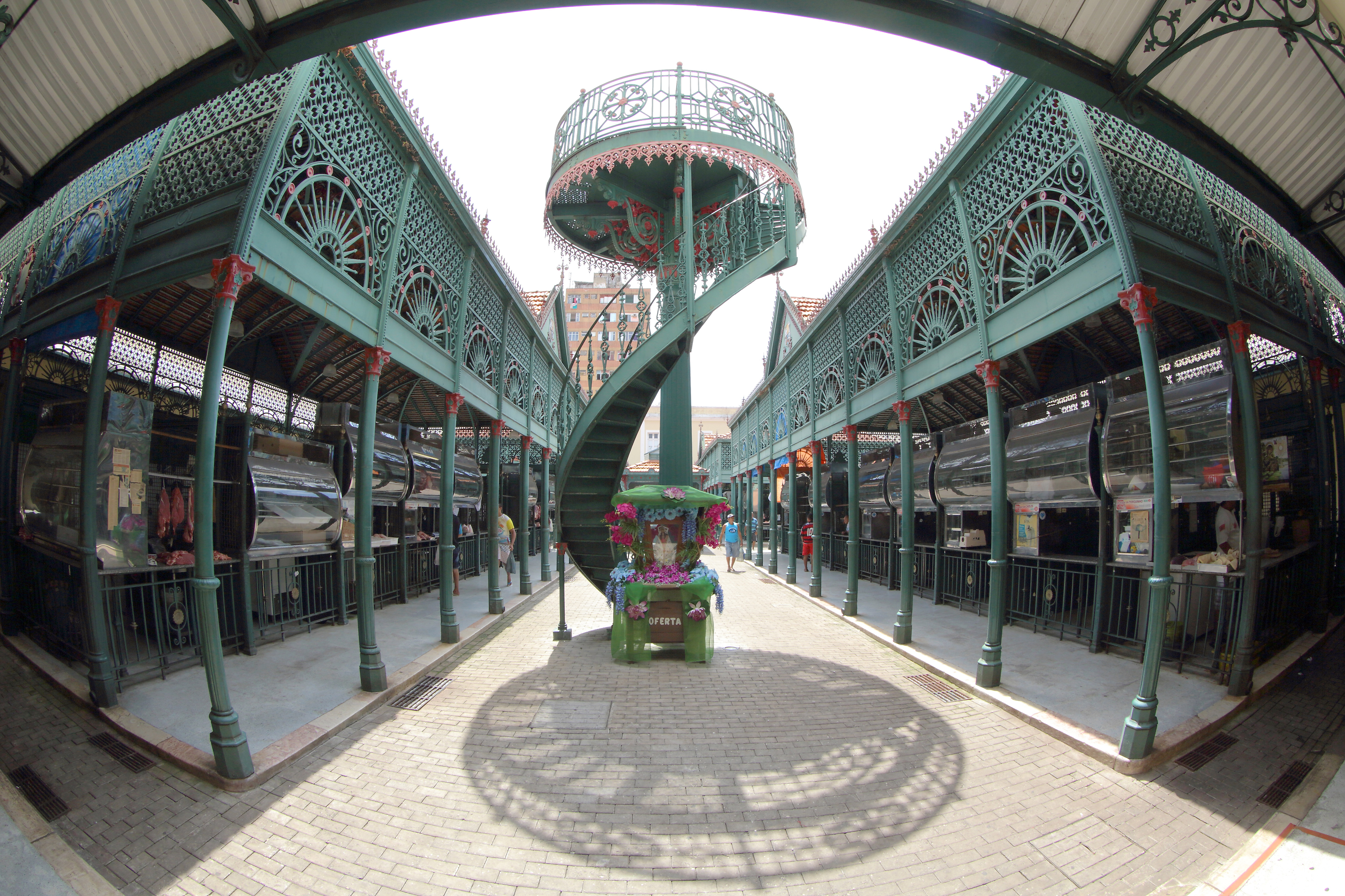

- Location within Brazil
- Alternative names: Francisco Bolonha Municipal Meat Market; Bolonha Market

General information
- Type: Market
- Location: Belém, Pará; Brazil
- Coordinates: 01°27′8.716″S 48°30′10.364″W
- Completed: 1867

The Francisco Bolonha Municipal Meat Market (Portuguese: Mercado Municipal de Carnes Francisco Bolonha), Bolonha Market (Mercado Bolonha) or simply Meat Market (Mercado de Carne), is a structure built in 1867 that belongs to the Ver-o-Peso Complex. It is located in the Brazilian city of Belém, capital of Pará, on Boulevard Castilhos França, in the neighborhood of Campina (or Comércio).

Inside the market there are several types of stands selling meat, meals (breakfast and lunch), handicrafts, Umbanda articles, drinks and more.

== History ==
Strategically located near the mouth of the Amazon River, Belém was the region's largest trading post for products extracted from the Amazon area destined for local and international markets, such as drogas do sertão and low-priced meat from the herds on Marajó Island, besides being the point of arrival for European products. In 1848, the beach area of Guajará Bay and Igarapé do Piri was landfilled to create the Rua Nova do Imperador (now Boulevard Castilhos França) and to build the art nouveau Meat Market in 1867, next to the Port of Piri and the Casa de Haver o Peso tax office.

In 1899, at the peak of the rubber cycle, the landscape of Ver-o-Peso underwent new changes: the Meat Market was enlarged, the Casa de Haver-o-Peso was demolished in 1899 to build the Iron Market, the embankment of Guajará Bay was expanded and the Port of Belém was built in 1909, as well as other structures that emerged following the European architectural pattern of eclectic style with art nouveau influence.

In 1908, the market was remodeled by architect and engineer Francisco Bolonha, who replaced the wooden beams with a cast iron structure from Scotland, which is still present today.

== Historical heritage ==
The market is part of the architectural and landscape complex of Ver-o-Peso, which was listed as a historical heritage by the National Historic and Artistic Heritage Institute (IPHAN) in 1977. It covers an area of 35,000 m^{2} and includes a series of historic buildings such as the Meat Market, Ver-o-Peso Dock, Açaí Fair, Boulevard Castilhos França, Siqueira Campos Square, Solar da Beira and the Ver-o-Peso Market.

== See also ==
- Ver-o-Peso Complex
- Guajará Bay
- Feliz Lusitânia
