= Siqueira Campos Square =

Public space in Belém, Pará, Brazil

- Praça Siqueira Campos
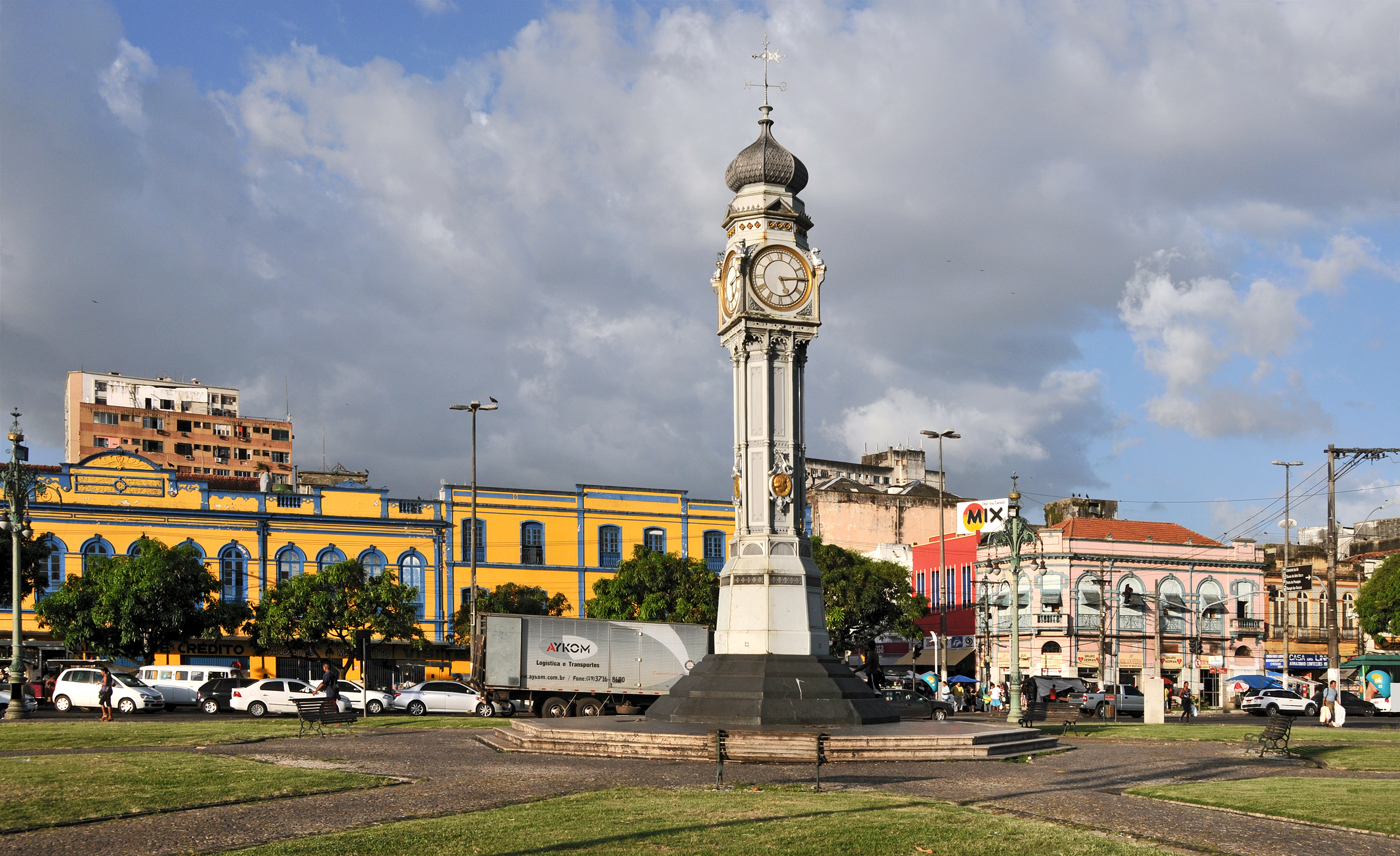
- Clock Square, with the centenary English clock standing out.
- Interactive map of Siqueira Campos Square
- Type: Public square
- Location: Belém, Pará; Brazil
- Coordinates: 01°27′14.18177″S 48°30′13.49021″W
- Opened: 1930
- Manager: City Hall of Belém

The Siqueira Campos Square (Portuguese: Praça Siqueira Campos) or Clock Square (Praça do Relógio) is a public space located at the Ver-o-Peso Dock, in the Cidade Velha neighborhood, in the Brazilian city of Belém, capital of Pará. The site, which is known for housing a huge English clock, comprises a total area of 2,727.45m², 1,246.78m² of paved area and 1,480.67m² of green area.

== History ==
The site chosen for the square was a vacant lot that became known as Praça dos Aliados (English: Allies Square) after the demolition of the building that existed on the area. The name comes from Lieutenant Siqueira Campos, a soldier who fought in the Copacabana Fort Revolt.

The monument in the center of the square is a clock built in 1930 by the English company J.W. Benson. and donated by Intendant Antonio Faciola. It measures 12 meters high, is made of iron and features four lamps in a central clock.

The square also has four old iron lampposts made by Macfarlaine in 1893. Due to the Revolution of 1930, Eurico Vale and Antonio Faciola were deposed and were unable to inaugurate the work. Major Magalhães Barata, Governor of Pará, and Father Leandro Pinheiro, Belém's Intendant, were present at the event.

Over the decades, the square has undergone several restorations. In 1988, the clock was repaired in order to return to regular operation, and in 1994, the site received new paintwork on the clock and the lampposts. Until 2020, the siren and its illuminated pointers were not working, but the City Hall had announced the revitalization of the place.

== Historical heritage ==
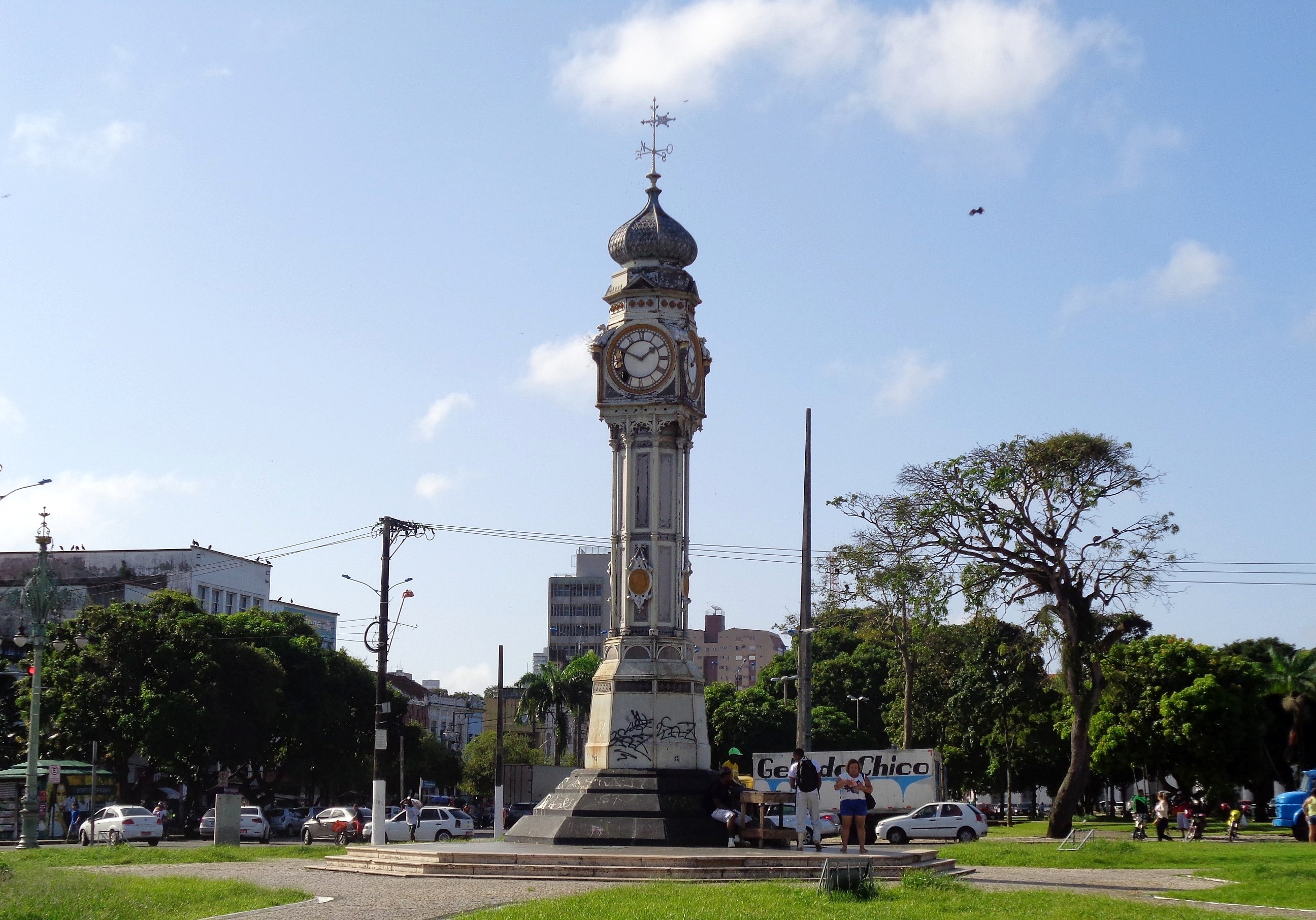
Clock Square and, in the background, Dom Pedro II Square.

The Siqueira Campos Square is part of the architectural and landscape complex of Ver-o-Peso, listed as a heritage site by the National Historic and Artistic Heritage Institute (IPHAN) in 1977. The complex covers an area of 35,000 square meters and includes a series of historic buildings such as the Boulevard Castilhos França, the Meat Market, the Ver-o-Peso Market, the Ver-o-Peso Dock, the Açaí Fair, the Ladeira do Castelo and the Solar da Beira.

The square is located on Portugal Avenue, where there are also other protected buildings such as the Dom Pedro II Square, the Antônio Lemos Palace (Blue Palace), the Lauro Sodré Palace (Government Palace) and the House of the Baron of Guajará.

== See also ==
- Ver-o-Peso Complex
- Feliz Lusitânia
