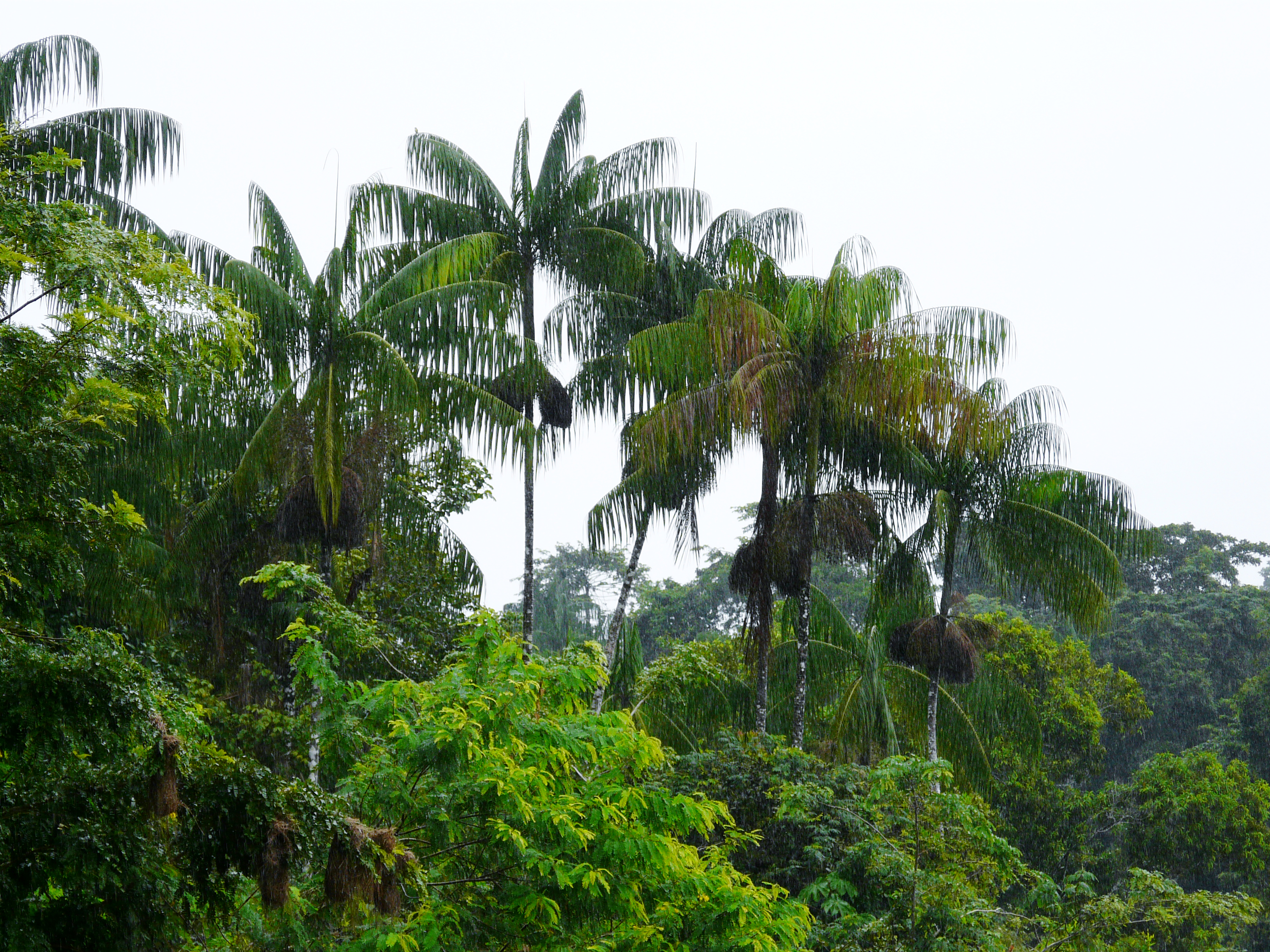
- Açaí palms on the Rio Negro in Brazil

Scientific classification
- Kingdom: Plantae
- Clade: Tracheophytes
- Clade: Angiosperms
- Clade: Monocots
- Clade: Commelinids
- Order: Arecales
- Family: Arecaceae
- Genus: Euterpe
- Species: E. oleracea

Binomial name
- Euterpe oleracea Mart.

Synonyms
- Euterpe brasiliana Oken; Catis martiana O.F.Cook; Euterpe badiocarpa Barb.Rodr.; Euterpe beardii L.H.Bailey; Euterpe cuatrecasana Dugand

= Açaí palm =

Palm tree with many uses, mainly fruit as cash crop

The açaí palm (/əˈsaɪ.iː/ ə-SY-ee, Brazilian Portuguese: [asaˈi]; from Nheengatu asai), Euterpe oleracea, is a species of palm tree (Arecaceae) cultivated for its fruit (açaí berries, or simply açaí), hearts of palm (a vegetable), leaves, and trunk wood. Global demand for the fruit has expanded rapidly in the 21st century, and the tree is cultivated for that purpose primarily.

The species is native to the Amazon, mainly in swamps and floodplains, with Brazil holding 99% of global production. Açaí palms are tall, slender trees growing to more than 25 m (80 ft) tall, with pinnate leaves up to 3 m (10 ft) long. The fruit is small, round, and black-purple in color. The fruit became a staple food in floodplain areas around the 18th century, but its consumption in urban areas and promotion as a health food only began in the mid-1990s along with the popularization of other Amazonian fruits outside the region.

== Name ==
The name açaí is a language variation of the Tupian word ïwasa’i, meaning “fruit that cries or expels water.”

In the binomial nomenclature, the genus Euterpe refers to the tree’s growth habit. Its specific epithet oleracea means "vegetable" in Latin, referring to the fruit as edible.

== Fruit ==
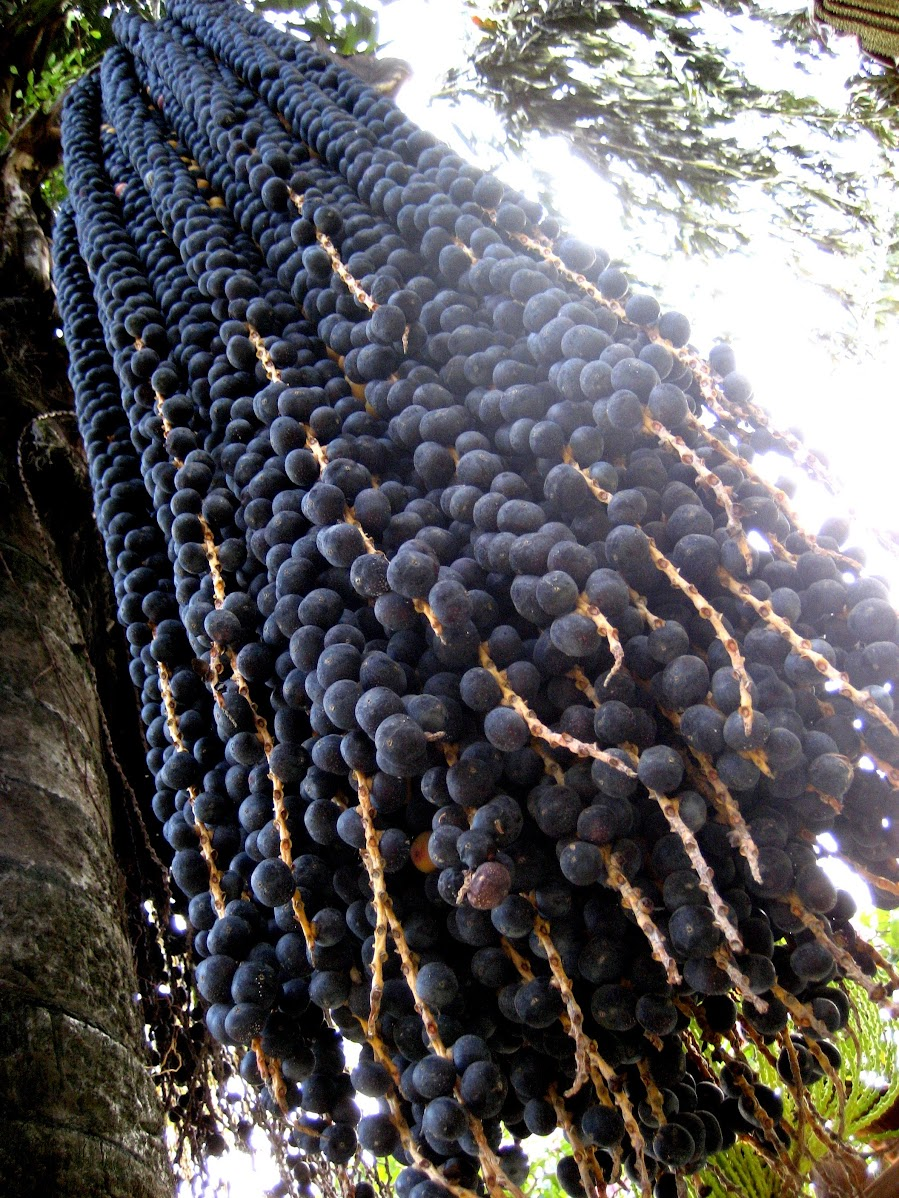
Fruit of the açaí palm

The fruit, commonly known as açaí or açaí berry, is a small, round, black-purple drupe about 25 mm (1 in) in circumference, similar in appearance to a grape, but smaller and with less pulp and produced in branched panicles of 500 to 900 fruits. The exocarp of the ripe fruits is a deep purple color, or green, depending on the kind of açaí and its maturity. The mesocarp is pulpy and thin, with a consistent thickness of 1 mm (0.04 in) or less. It surrounds the voluminous and hard endocarp, which contains a single large seed about 7–10 mm (0.3–0.4 in) in diameter. The seed makes up about 60–80% of the fruit. The palm bears fruit year round but the berry cannot be harvested during the rainy season. The açaí palm is a light-loving plant, and fruit yields greatly decrease in amount and quality if the plants are shaded.

== Cultivation ==
There are two harvests: one is normally between January and June, while the other is between August and December, producing larger volumes. In 2022, the state of Pará, which accounts for 90% of Brazil's total açaí economy, produced 8,158 tonnes (17,985,000 lb) of açaí berries, generating US$26 million in revenue. The 2022 production was 209 times greater than the volume produced in 2012.

=== Child labor concern ===
Children as young as 13 years old are employed as laborers to harvest the fruit, using machetes to clear paths in the rainforest, and climbing trees up to 70 feet (21 m) tall without harnesses to collect berries in the canopy, a process leading to falls and severe injuries in some children.

=== Cultivars ===
Few named cultivars exist, and varieties differ mostly in the nature of the fruit:

- Branco ("White") is a rare variety local to the Amazon estuary in which the berries do not change color, but remain green when ripe. This is believed to be due to a recessive gene since only about 30% of 'Branco' palm seeds mature to express this trait.
- BRS-Pará was developed in 2004 by the Brazilian Agricultural Research Agency. The pulp yield ranges from 15% to 25%.
- BRS Pai d'Égua is the newest cultivar developed by the Brazilian Agricultural Research Agency.

== Nutritional content ==
A powdered preparation of freeze-dried açaí fruit pulp and skin was reported to contain (per 100 g of dry powder) 534 calories, 52 g carbohydrates, 8 g protein, and 33 g total fat. The carbohydrate portion included 44 g of dietary fiber with low sugar levels, and the fat portion consisted of oleic acid (56% of total fats), palmitic acid (24%), and linoleic acid (13%). The powder was also shown to contain (per 100 g) negligible vitamin C, 260 mg calcium, 4 mg iron, and 1002 IU vitamin A.

== Anthocyanins ==
Anthocyanins define the blue pigmentation of açaí and the antioxidant capacity of the plant's natural defense mechanisms and in laboratory experiments in vitro. Anthocyanins in açaí accounted for only about 10% of the overall antioxidant capacity in vitro. The Linus Pauling Institute and European Food Safety Authority state that "the relative contribution of dietary flavonoids to (...) antioxidant function in vivo is likely to be very small or negligible". Unlike in controlled test tube conditions, anthocyanins have been shown to be poorly conserved (less than 5%) in vivo, and most of what is absorbed exists as chemically modified metabolites destined for rapid excretion.

A powdered preparation of freeze-dried açaí fruit pulp and skin was shown to contain cyanidin 3-O-glucoside and cyanidin 3-O-rutinoside as major anthocyanins (3.19 mg/g). The powdered preparation was also reported to contain twelve flavonoid-like compounds, including homoorientin, orientin, taxifolin deoxyhexose, isovitexin, scoparin, as well as proanthocyanidins (12.89 mg/g), and low levels of resveratrol (1.1 μg/g).

== Marketing ==
In the 1980s, the Brazilian Gracie family marketed açaí as an energy drink or as crushed fruit served with granola and bananas; this demand led to the building of cottage industries and processing plants to pulp and freeze açaí for export.

=== Scams ===
In the early 2000s, numerous companies advertised açaí products online, with many ads featuring counterfeit testimonials and products. In 2009, açaí scams were ranked No. 1 on the U.S. Federal Trade Commission's "scams and rip-offs" list, so that by 2011 sales of açaí flattened as the fad waned.

According to the Washington, D.C.–based Center for Science in the Public Interest thousands of consumers had trouble stopping recurrent charges on their credit cards when they canceled free trials of some açaí-based products. In 2003, American celebrity doctor Nicholas Perricone included açaí berries among "superfoods", but such extravagant marketing claims regarding açaí as miracle cures for everything from obesity to attention-deficit disorder were challenged in subsequent studies.

The FTC handed down an $80 million judgement in January 2012 against five companies that were marketing açaí berry supplements with fraudulent claims that their products promoted weight loss and prevented colon cancer. One company, Central Coast Nutraceuticals, was ordered to pay a $1.5 million settlement.

== Production ==
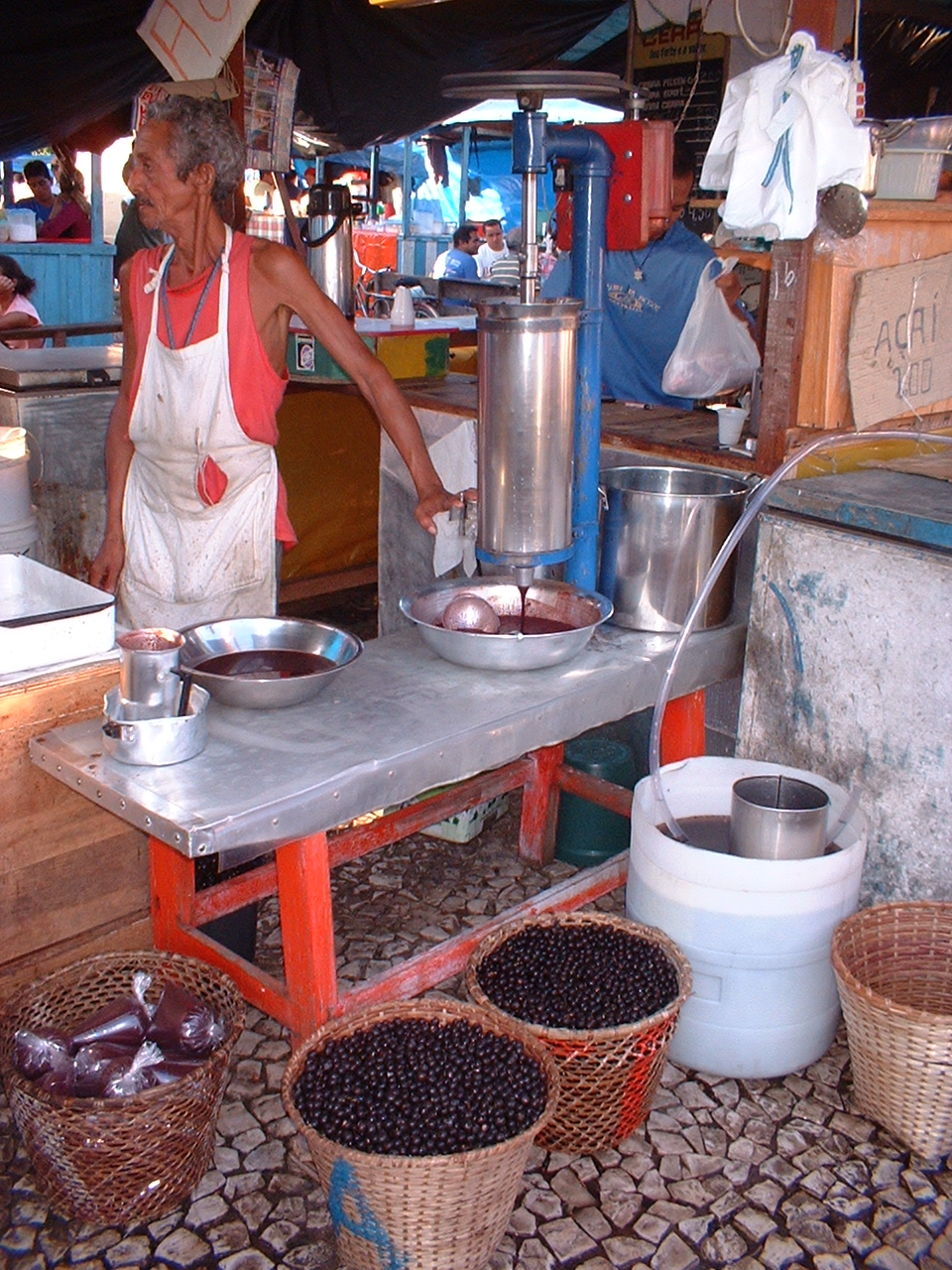
Street vendor of açaí, next to Ver-o-Peso market in Belém

Brazil supplies 99% of global açaí berries, producing 1.7 million tons in 2024. Other producers include Colombia (0.35%) and Bolivia (0.006%).

The state of Pará grows around 95% of Brazilian açaí berries, and produced more than 1.2 million tons of açaí in 2019.

=== Chagas disease ===
Several studies have implicated açaí fruit in the transmission of Chagas disease. This is a risk when unpasteurized uncleaned fruits are consumed, and has been found in the regions where the fruit is harvested.

== Uses ==
=== As a food product ===
Fresh açaí has been consumed as a dietary staple in the region around the Amazon river delta for centuries. The fruit is processed into pulp for supply to food product manufacturers or retailers, sold as frozen pulp, juice, or an ingredient in various products from beverages, including grain alcohol, smoothies, foods, cosmetics and supplements. In Brazil, it is commonly eaten as açaí na tigela.

In a study of three traditional Caboclo populations in the Brazilian Amazon, açaí palm was described as the most important plant species because the fruit makes up a major component of their diet, up to 42% of the total food intake by weight.

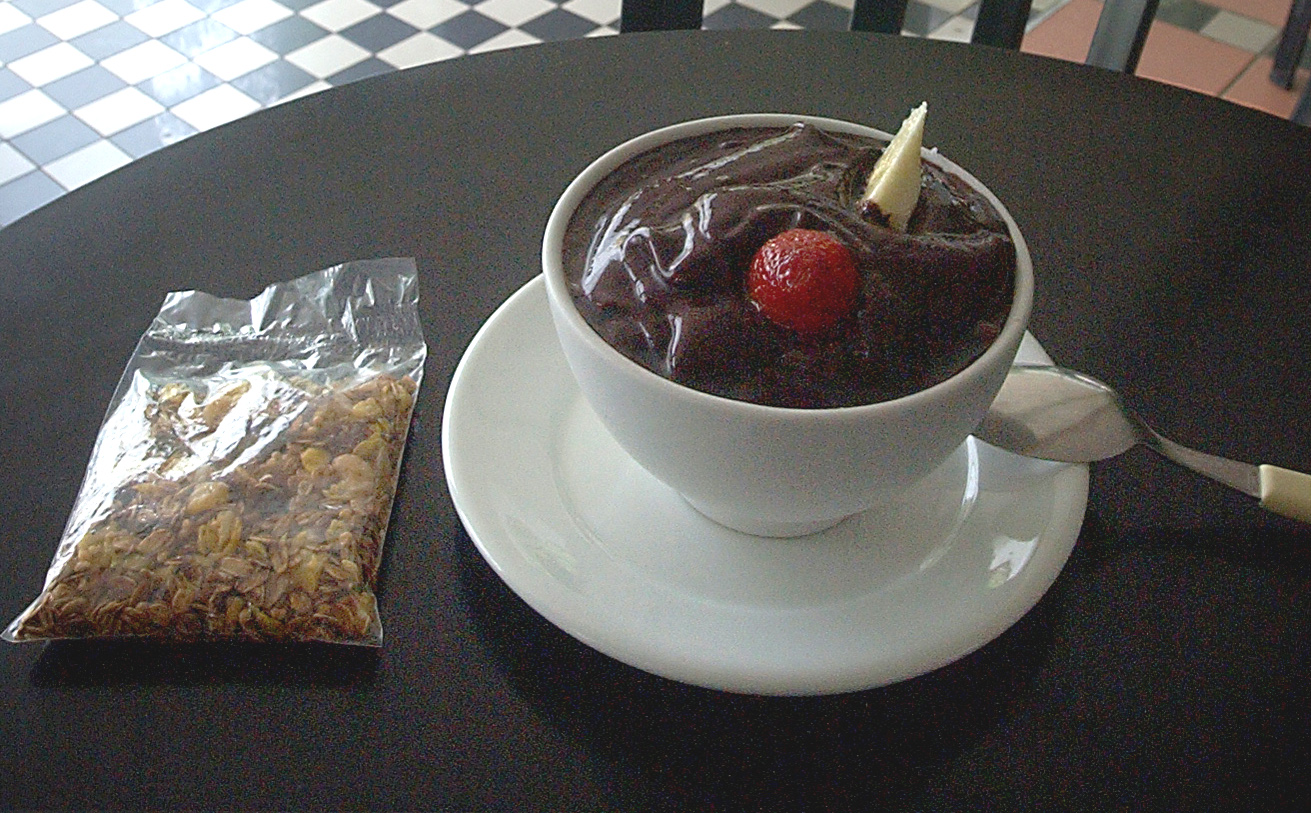
Açaí bowl

Açaí na tigela (known in English as açaí bowl) is a Brazilian dessert made from frozen açaí berry purée, served in a bowl and topped with other fruit and granola.

=== Dietary supplement ===
As of 2008, no açaí products have been evaluated by the FDA, and their efficacy is doubtful.

As of 2009, there is no scientific evidence that açaí consumption affects body weight, promotes weight loss or has any positive health effect.

=== Açaí oil ===
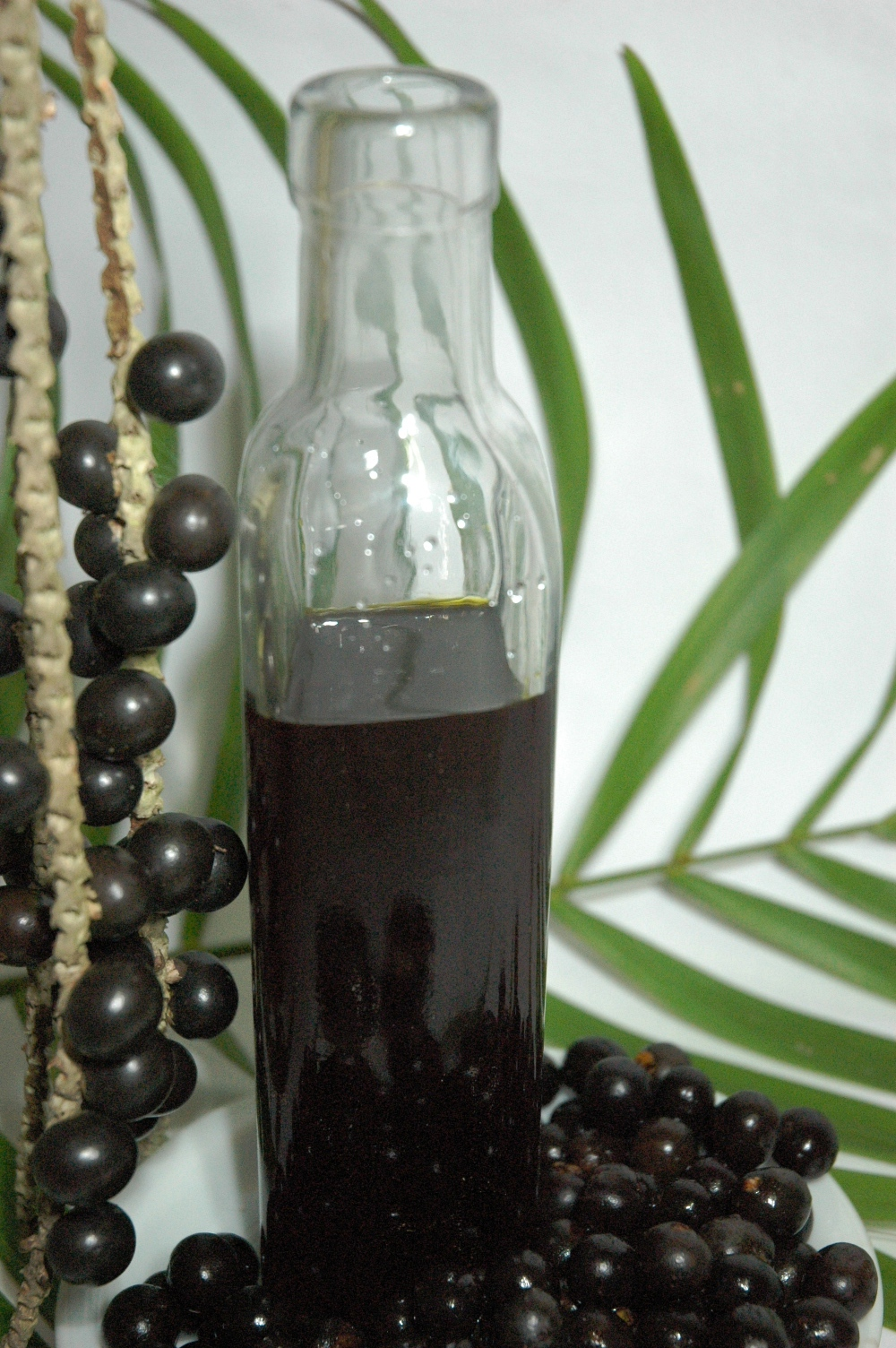
Açai oil

Açaí oil is suitable for cooking or as a salad dressing, but is mainly used in cosmetics as shampoos, soaps or skin moisturizers.

The oil compartments in açaí fruit contain polyphenols such as procyanidin oligomers and vanillic acid, syringic acid, p-hydroxybenzoic acid, protocatechuic acid, and ferulic acid, which were shown to degrade substantially during storage or exposure to heat. Although these compounds are under study for potential health effects, there remains no substantial evidence that açaí polyphenols have any effect in humans. Açaí oil is green in color, has a bland aroma, and is high in oleic and palmitic fatty acids.

=== Other uses ===
Leaves of the palm may be made into hats, mats, baskets, brooms and roof thatch for homes, and trunk wood, resistant to pests, for building construction. Tree trunks may be processed to yield dietary minerals.

Comprising 80% of the fruit mass, açaí seeds may be ground for livestock food or as a component of organic soil for plants. Planted seeds are used for new palm tree stock, which, under the right growing conditions, can require months to form seedlings. Seeds may become waste in landfills or used as fuel for producing bricks.

=== Research ===
Orally administered açaí has been tested as a contrast agent for magnetic resonance imaging (MRI) of the gastrointestinal system. Its anthocyanins have also been characterized for stability as a natural food coloring agent.

== Gallery ==
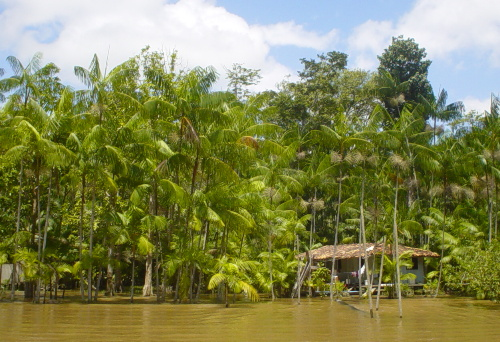
A grove of açaí palms in Brazil

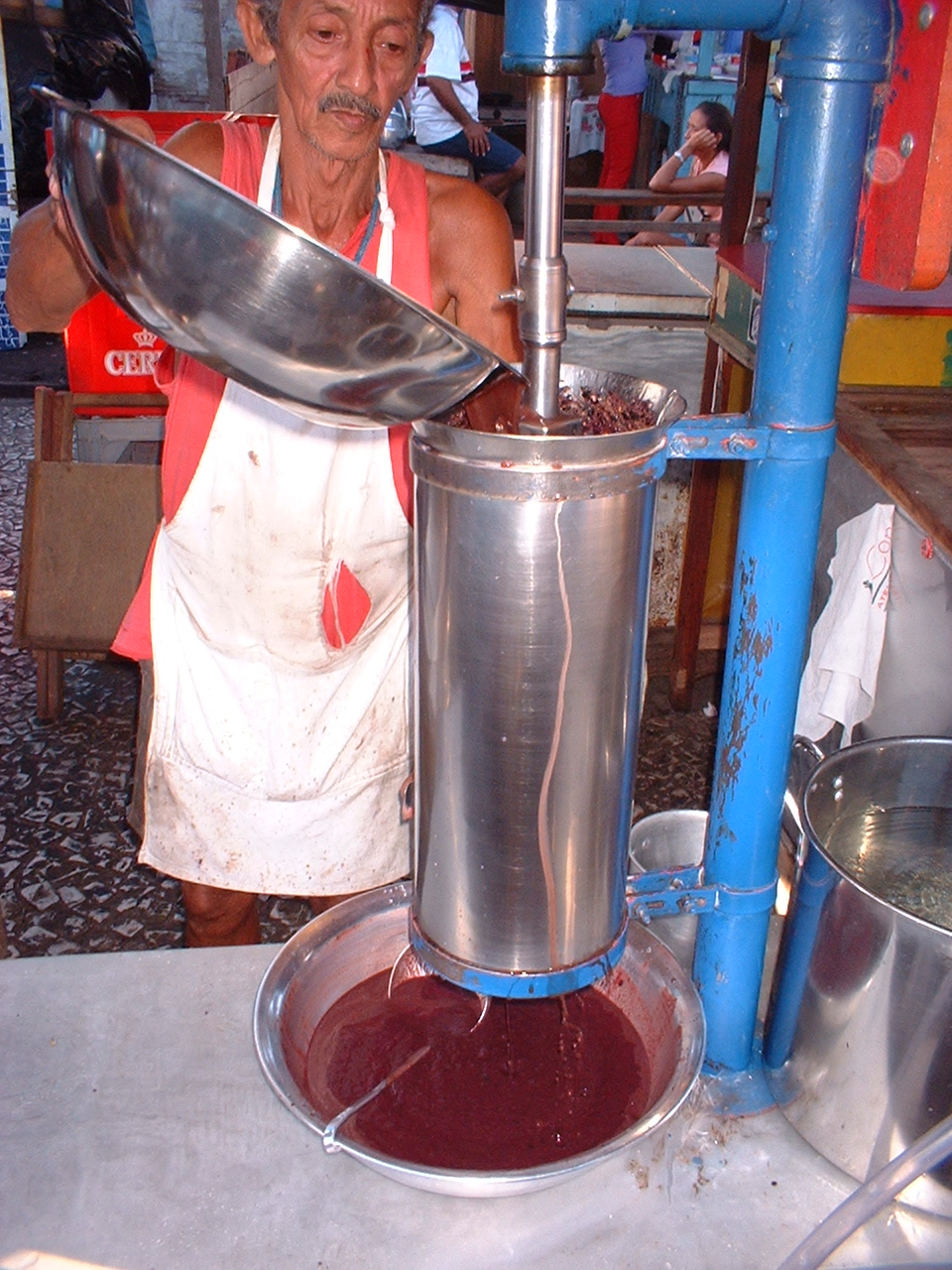
Separation of açaí pulp from seeds in market Belém, Pará, Brazil

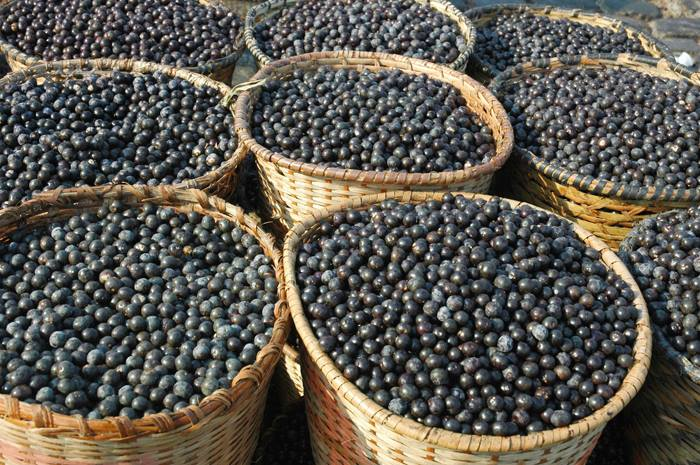
An açaí harvest

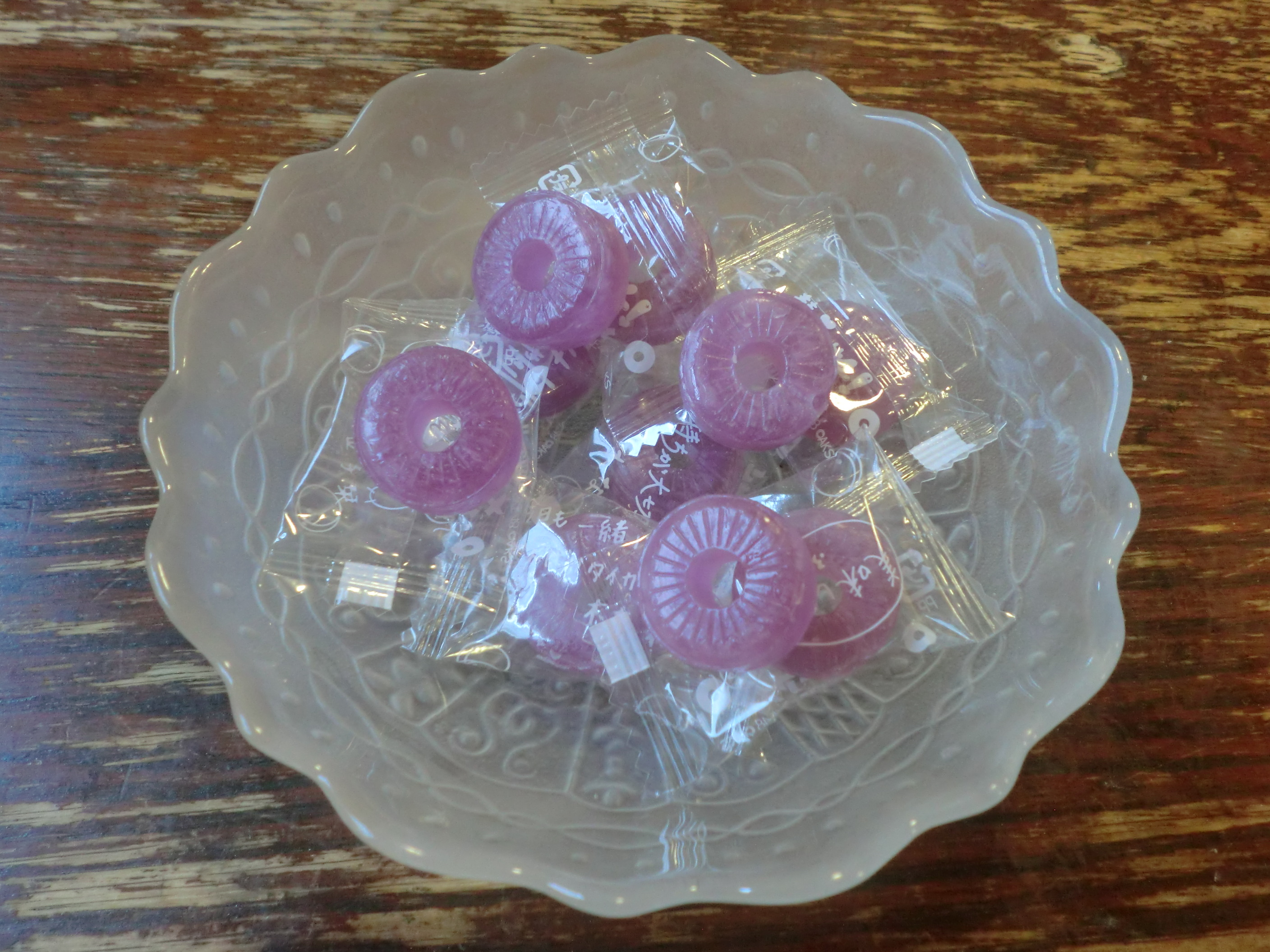
Japanese açaí candy

== See also ==
- Euterpe edulis
- Euterpe precatoria
- Feira do Açaí
