= Feira do Açaí =

Fair in Belém, Pará, Brazil

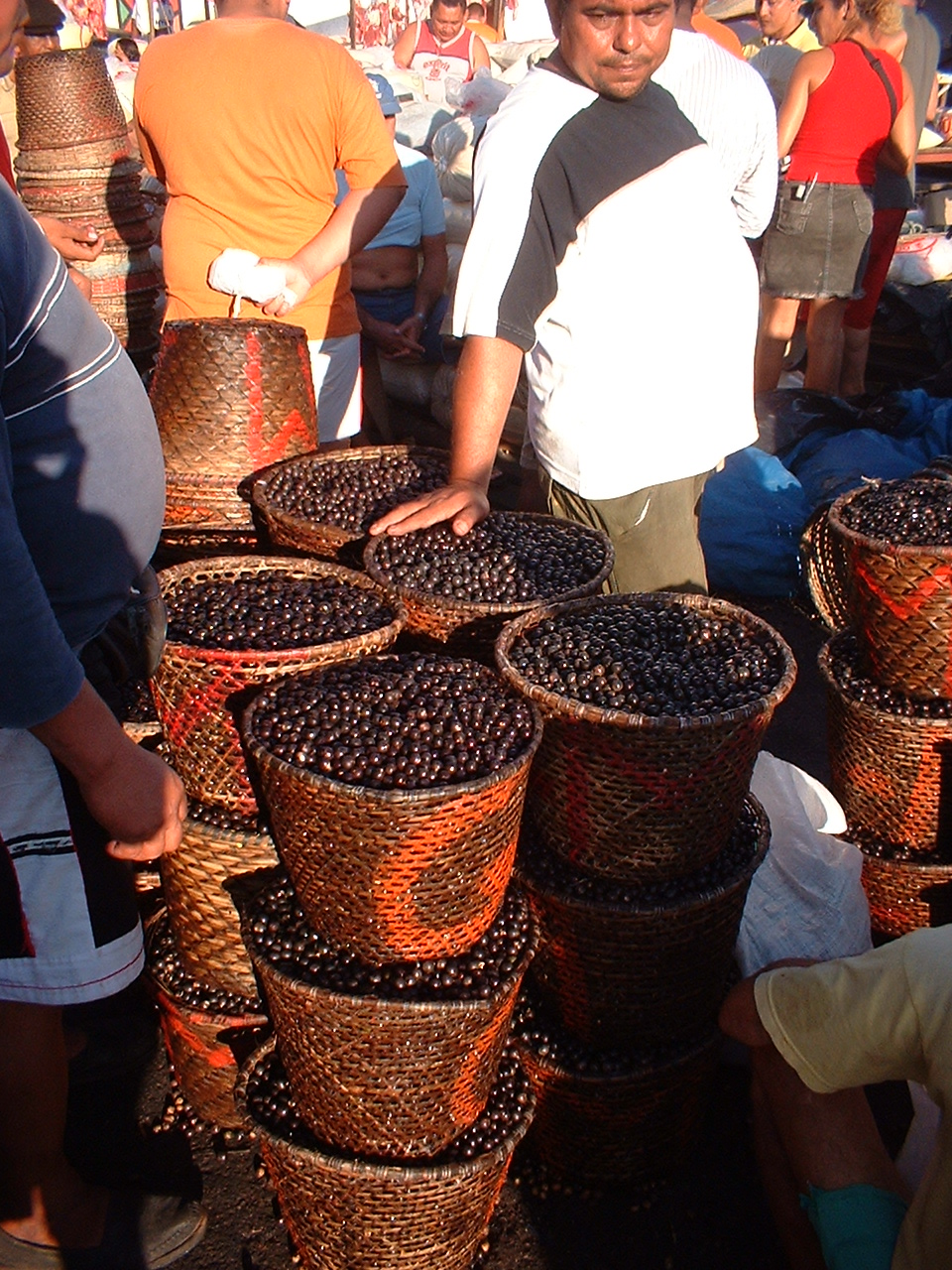
Açaí pots for sale at the fair.

The Feira do Açaí (Açaí Fair in English) is a public trading post, an open-air market for the commercialization of açaí, a small port area, and a set of bars, which is part of the Ver-o-Peso Complex, located on the shores of the Guajará Bay in the district of Cidade Velha, in the city of Belém, Pará, Brazil. The fair is surrounded by Castelo Forte (Castle-Fort; built in 1616), Praça do Relógio (Clock Square), and Doca das Embarcações (Vessels' Dock; fish fair est. 1803).

The fair supplies the city via river with fruit in natura from the açaí palm, coming from the riverside communities who live in the insular area of Belém, with 329.9361 km^{2} composed of forty-two islands. The place offers tourists the sight of the movement (comings and goings) of the porters and vendors with their pots full of fruit.

Açaí has a deep impact on the region's population, with a consumption in liters twice as high as milk consumption.

Located in the Historic Center of Belém, near the Feliz Lusitânia (Happy Lusitania) complex, the fair also contains bars.

Michel Pinho, president of the Cultural Foundation of Belém (Fumbel), stated that the city is going through a rescue of several cultures and the return of a local musical tradition in 2022, where the Açaí Fair resumes with carimbó, samba, and other such events as the popular initiative projects "carimbó no caroço" and "fé no batuque".

== Açaí ==
The consumption of açaí is well-spread across Brazil, given its nutritional value, being more present in Northern diet; however, it has been part of the diet of indigenous peoples since pre-Columbian times.

Açaí comes from a palm tree and is a dark purple berry containing a proportionally large pit and little pulp. In Brazil, it is the symbol of the state of Pará and grows spontaneously in the Amazon floodplains. It is very present in the urban agricultural production of the insular area of Belém, supplied mainly by the river.

To be consumed, it must first go through a pulping machine or be mashed by hand so that the pulp is detached from the seed/pit. After being mixed with water, it becomes a thick juice known as "vinho do açaí" (açaí wine). In the North region, this is commonly mixed with manioc flour or tapioca starch in a bowl, forming a "pirão", accompanied by fried fish or fried beef.

== Functioning ==
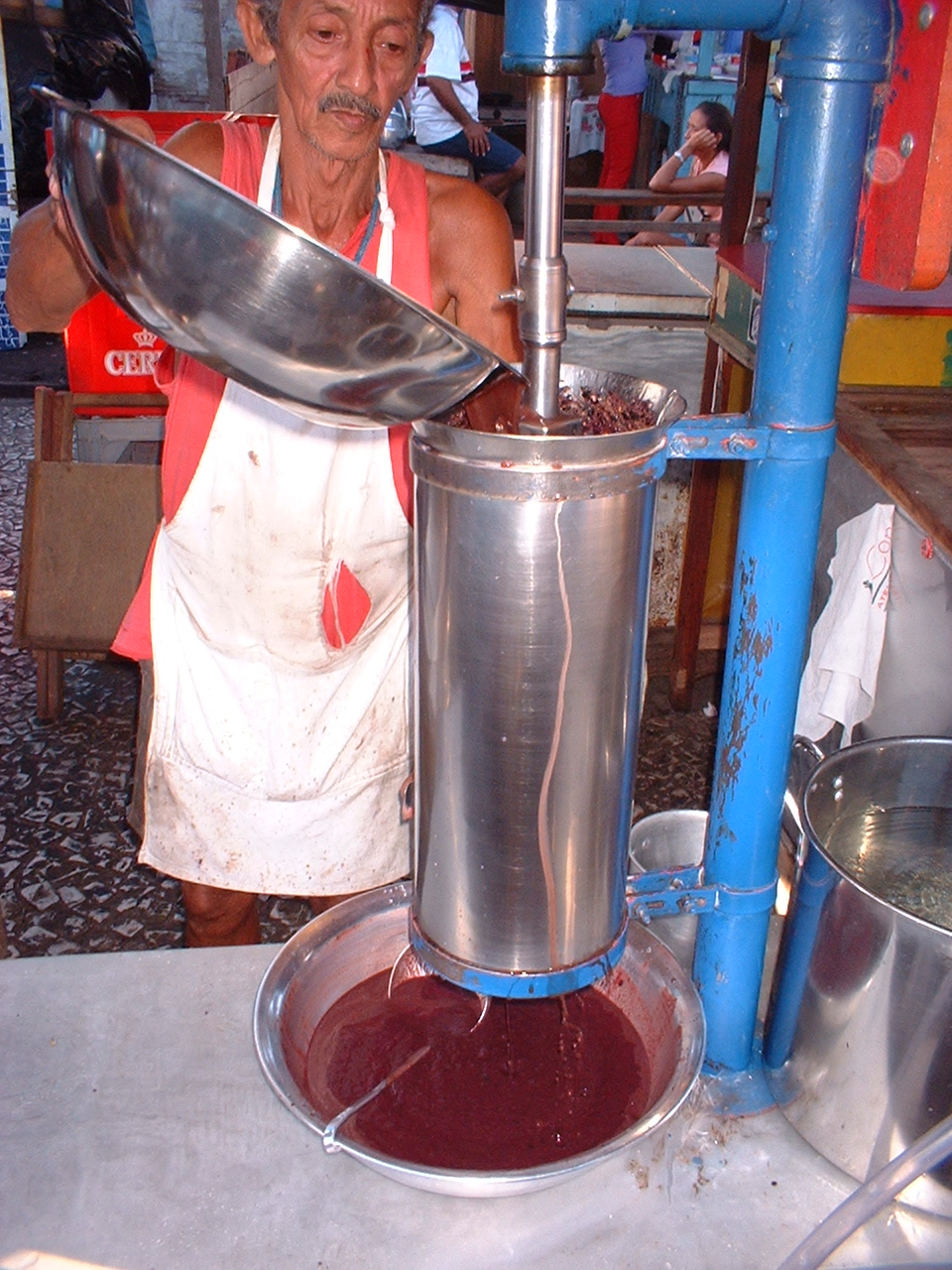
A mechanical pulping machine, which replaced the primitive hand-rotating one.

The fair operates in the early hours of the morning, with the unloading of tons of açaí distributed in various paneiros (straw baskets) taken from the boats (nicknamed "pô-pô-pô"; in English: "poh-poh-poh") that anchor there, negotiated in the old supply/demand style. From there, açaí is then processed in the neighborhoods of the capital city.

== Statistics ==
The state of Pará produces about 820,000 tons of açaí per year, corresponding to 85% of national production, making it the largest producer in the country. Most of the produce remain in the state; 60% are consumed in the region, 30% are transported to other Brazilian states, and 10% are exported abroad.

== Historical site ==
The fair is part of the architectural and landscape complex of Ver-o-Peso, listed by IPHAN in 1977, which comprises an area of 35,000 square meters, with a series of historical buildings, including Boulevard Castilhos França, Meat Market, the Fish Market, the Siqueira Campos Square, the Açaí Fair, Castle Hill, and the Fisherman's Square.

== See also ==
- Antônio Lemos Palace
- Ver-o-peso
- History of Belém
- Solar da Beira
