= Ver-o-peso =

Street market in Belém, Pará, Brazil

Ver-o-Peso Market
- Mercado Ver-o-Peso
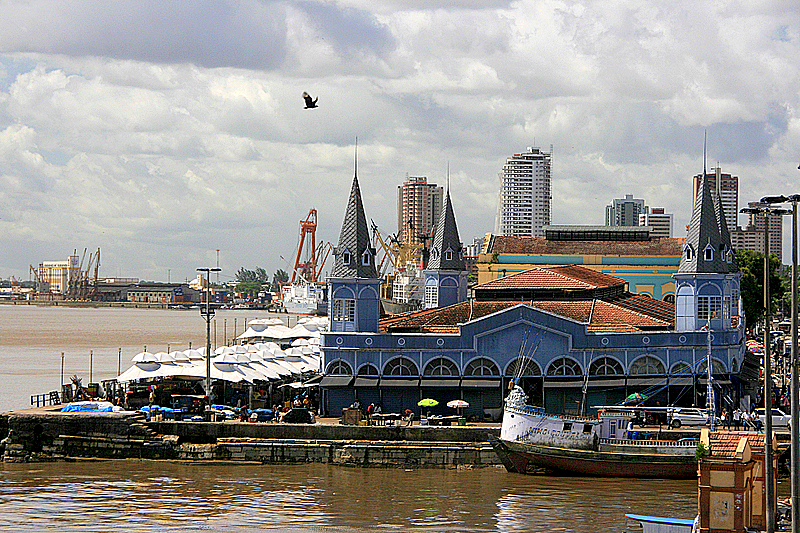
- View of the Ver-o-Peso Iron Market on the shores of Guajará Bay.
- Interactive map of the Ver-o-Peso Market area
- Former names: Casa de Haver o Peso

General information
- Type: Street market, Historical heritage
- Location: Belém, Pará, Brazil
- Coordinates: 1°27′8″S 48°30′13″W
- Opened: 1901

Design and construction
- Awards: Property listed by IPHAN, Provisional World Heritage Site, Seven Wonders of Brazil

Other information
- Facilities: Francisco Bolonha Meat Market, Açaí Market, Ver-o-Peso Dock, Iron Market

The Ver-o-Peso Market, Mercado Municipal Bolonha de Peixe, Mercado de Ferro, or Ver-o-Peso is a street market and fair, and small port area inaugurated in 1901 (replacing the "Casa de Haver-o-Peso", 1625-1899) that is part of the Ver-o-Peso Complex (1625). It is located in the city of Belém (Pará) in the neighborhood of Campina, on the shores of Guajará Bay, next to the Docks Station.

It is considered one of the oldest public markets in the country and was elected one of the wonders of the state of Pará and one of the 7 Wonders of Brazil.

A touristic, cultural, and economic point of the city of Belém, formed by the Iron Market, Pescador Square, the Ship Dock (1803), and the Fish Market, the Pedra do Peixe, and the street market (considered the largest in Latin America) that supplies the city with various goods: clothing, medicinal herbs, and food (such as fish and meat) coming from the surrounding islands of the capital and the inland municipalities, supplied by the river.

The market is famous for one of the symbols of northern Brazilian culinary, the "fried fish with açaí".

== Name ==
The marked is called "Ver-o-Peso" following a colonial era tradition, since the tax collector's main post was located there, which was called "Casa do Haver-o-peso" ("Have-the-Weight House"). (Note: "Peso" means "weight" or "to weight" in Portuguese) It was in the "Haver-o-peso house" that the taxes over goods brought from the Amazon forests, rivers and countryside should be paid to the Portuguese crown, but only after their weight was measured, hence the name, which later suffered a contraction.

== History ==
With a strategic position at the mouth of the Amazon River, Belém was the largest trading post of the region for products extracted from the Amazon region (known as "drogas do sertão", "drugs of the sertão" in English) destined for local and international markets, for meat with a low price from the herds on the Marajó Island, and the arrival point of European products. In 1625, in the area of the Igarapé do Piri (the current Mercado Ver-o-Peso), the Portuguese installed the commercial inspection post Casa de Haver o Peso, to control the weight and collect taxes on goods brought to the headquarters of the Captaincy of Grão-Pará (State of Maranhão), granted by a royal provision to the Chamber of Belém.

In 1803, during the government of Marcos de Noronha e Brito, Count of Arches, the igarapé do Piri was filled in to meet the urban advances of Belém. The mouth was transformed into the Ver-o-Peso Dock and the Pedra do Peixe, made of English lioz, and the activities of the tax office were maintained there.

Although in 1839 the city was shaken by the popular revolt of Cabanagem (1835-1840), the Casa de Haver o Peso functioned until the middle of 1839, when in October, President Bernardo de Souza Franco extinguished the tax office and the House was leased for the sale of fresh fish, until 1847, when the lease ended and the Casa de Haver o Peso was demolished. In 1855, during the Rubber Cycle (1879 - 1912), commercial importance increased, mainly for the international scenario. Thus, new urban changes occurred: the margin of Guajará Bay was filled in, and important buildings were made following the European architectural pattern of eclectic style, influenced by art nouveau, among them: the Meat Market (1867), Antônio Lemos Palace (1873), and Theatro da Paz (1878).

In 1897, the company La Rocque Pinto & Cia won the public tender for the construction of the Municipal Fish Market, or Mercado de Ferro, as the Ver-o-Peso market was initially known, authorized by municipal law no. 173.

In 1899, after the demolition of the "Casa de Haver-o-Peso" (1625) the building of the Iron Market began, with the project of Henrique La Rocque, near the Municipal Meat Market, or Mercado Bologna. It was inaugurated in 1901, in the form of a dodecagon measuring 1,197 m^{2} (12,884 sq. feet), with a metallic structure in zinc Vieille-Montagne (brought prefabricated from England and New York and transported by river to Belém).

The project followed the French aesthetic trend of art nouveau of the Belle Époque. In this period the expansion of the Meat Market also occurred.

The complex has undergone two major renovations. The first one was in 1985, during the administration of Almir Gabriel, with improvements to the Iron Market, Solar da Beira (being transformed into a restaurant and cultural space), the Pescador Square, and, the free market. The construction of the Velames Square and the setting up of standardized stalls also took place. In 1998 and 2002, the second renovation occurred in stages, under the municipal administration of Edmilson Rodrigues, with general intervention in the fair, contemplating landscape aspects of the place and qualifying the market vendors.

== Listed property ==
The iron market and the free market are part of the architectural and landscape complex of Ver-o-Peso, listed by IPHAN in 1977, which comprises an area of 35 thousand square meters, with a series of historical buildings, including the Meat Market, the Pescador Square, the Relógio Square, the Dock, the Açaí Fair, the Castle Hill, and the Solar da Beira.

== Gallery ==
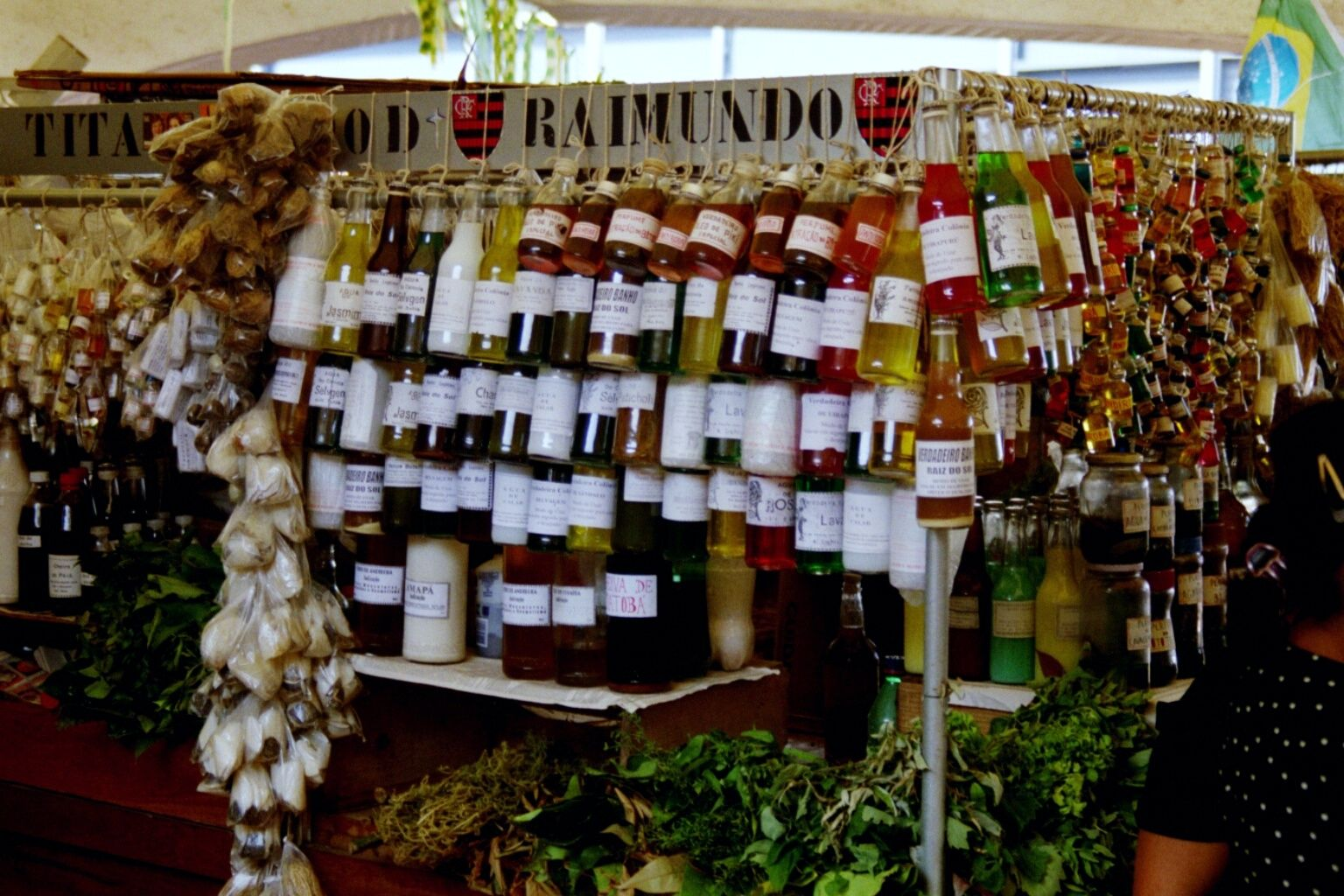

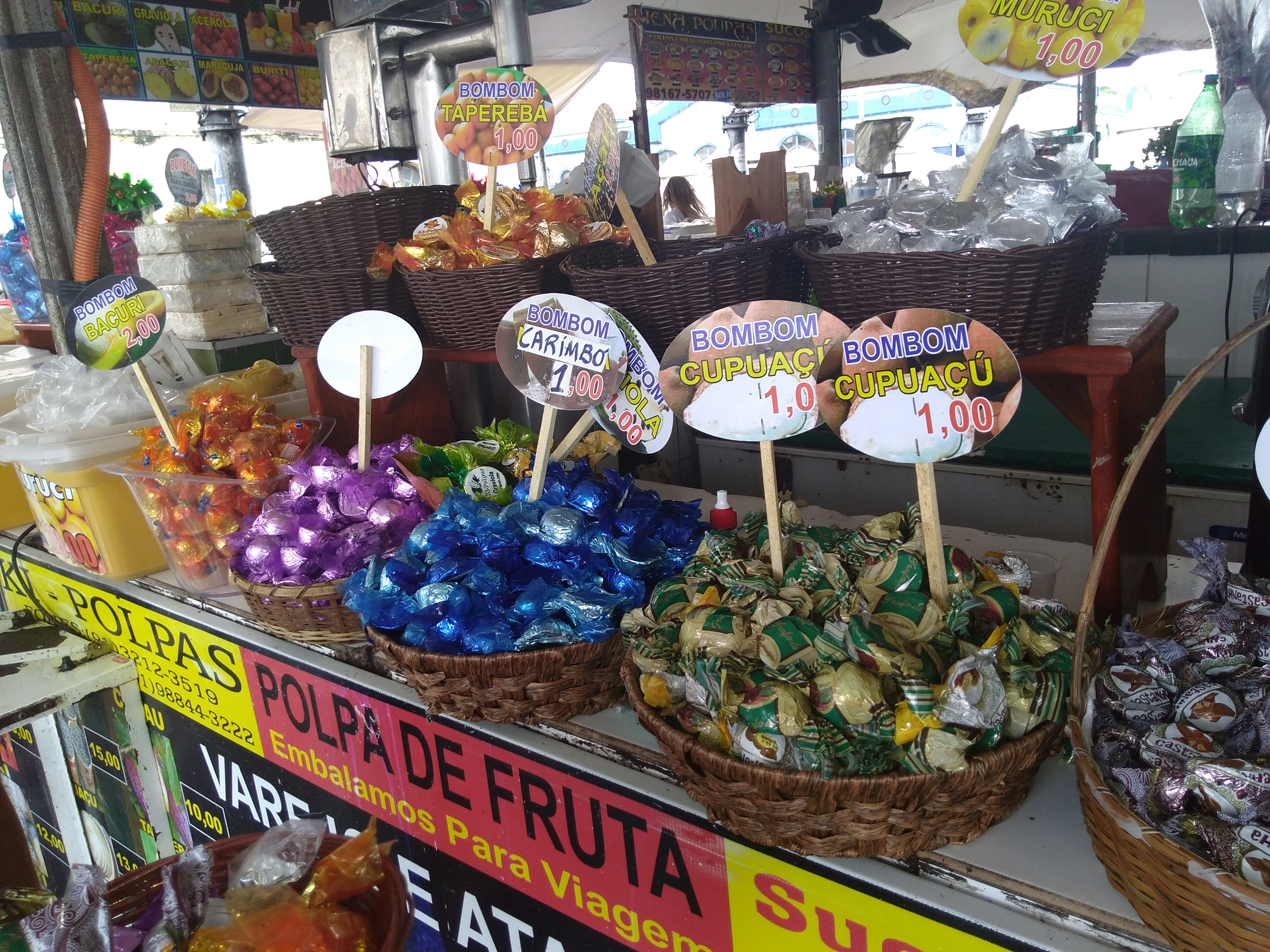

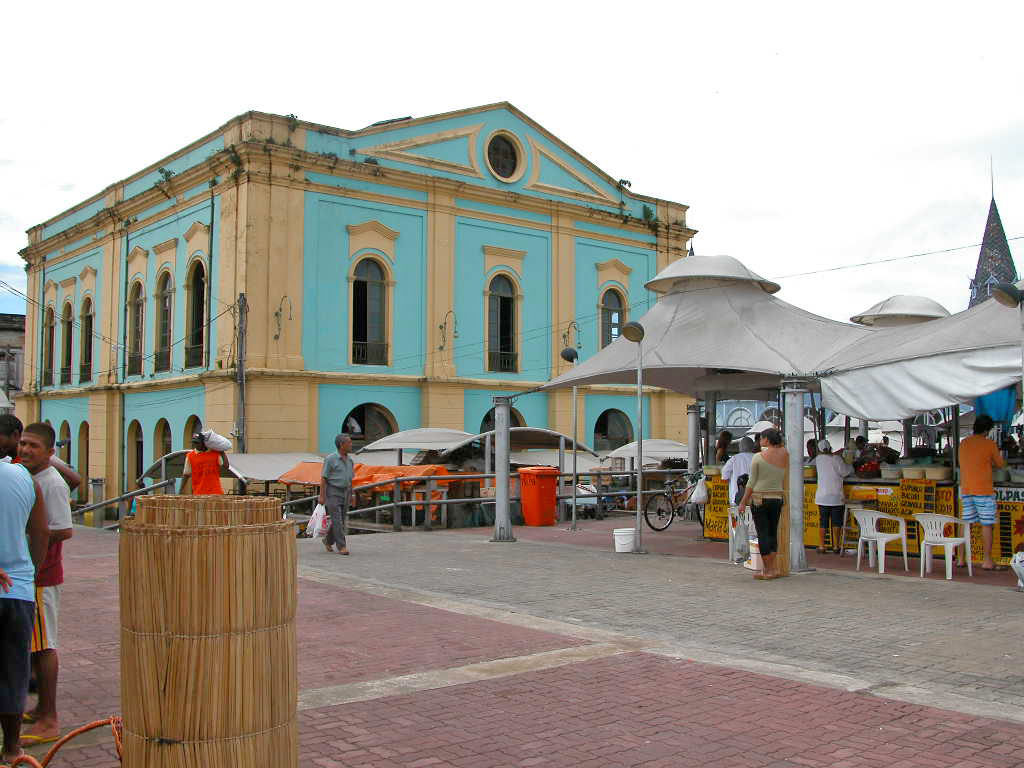

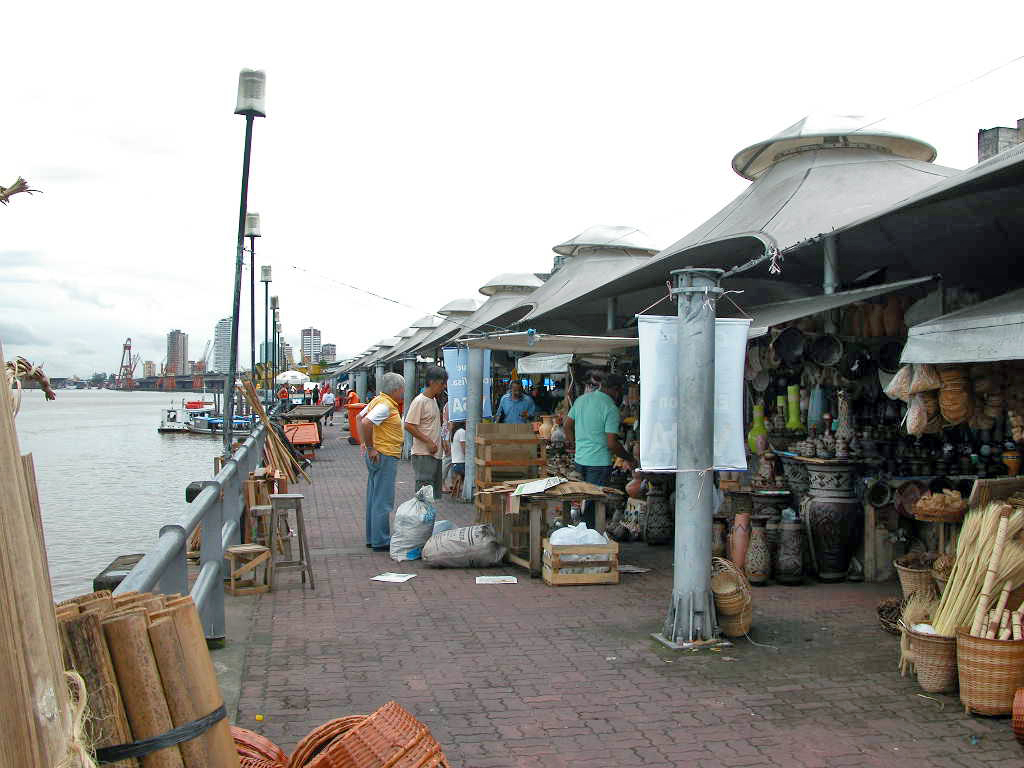

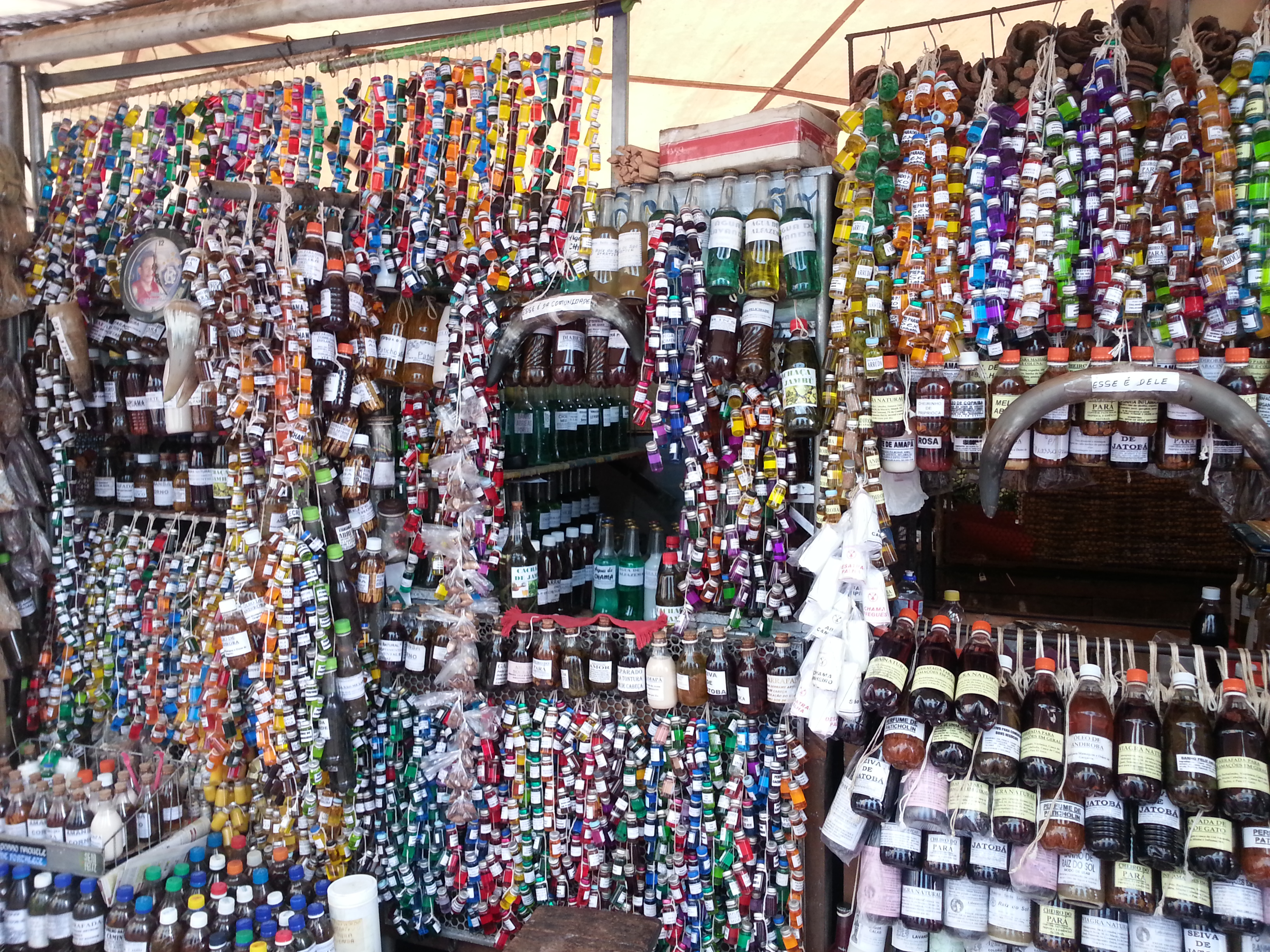

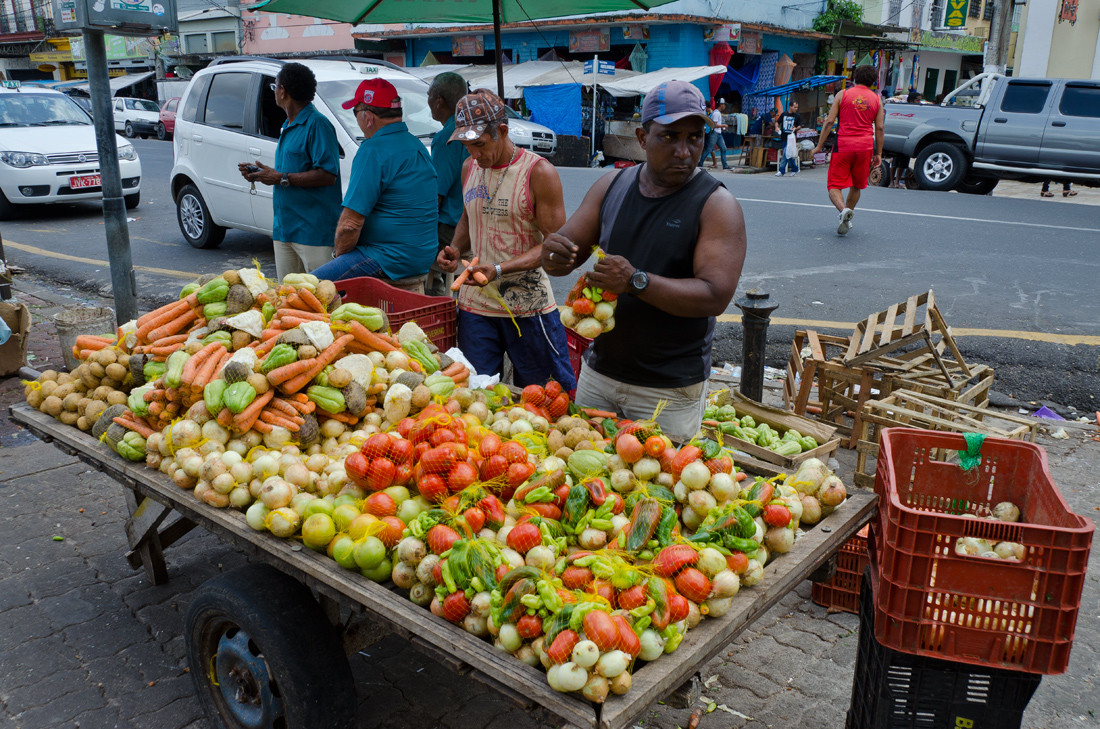

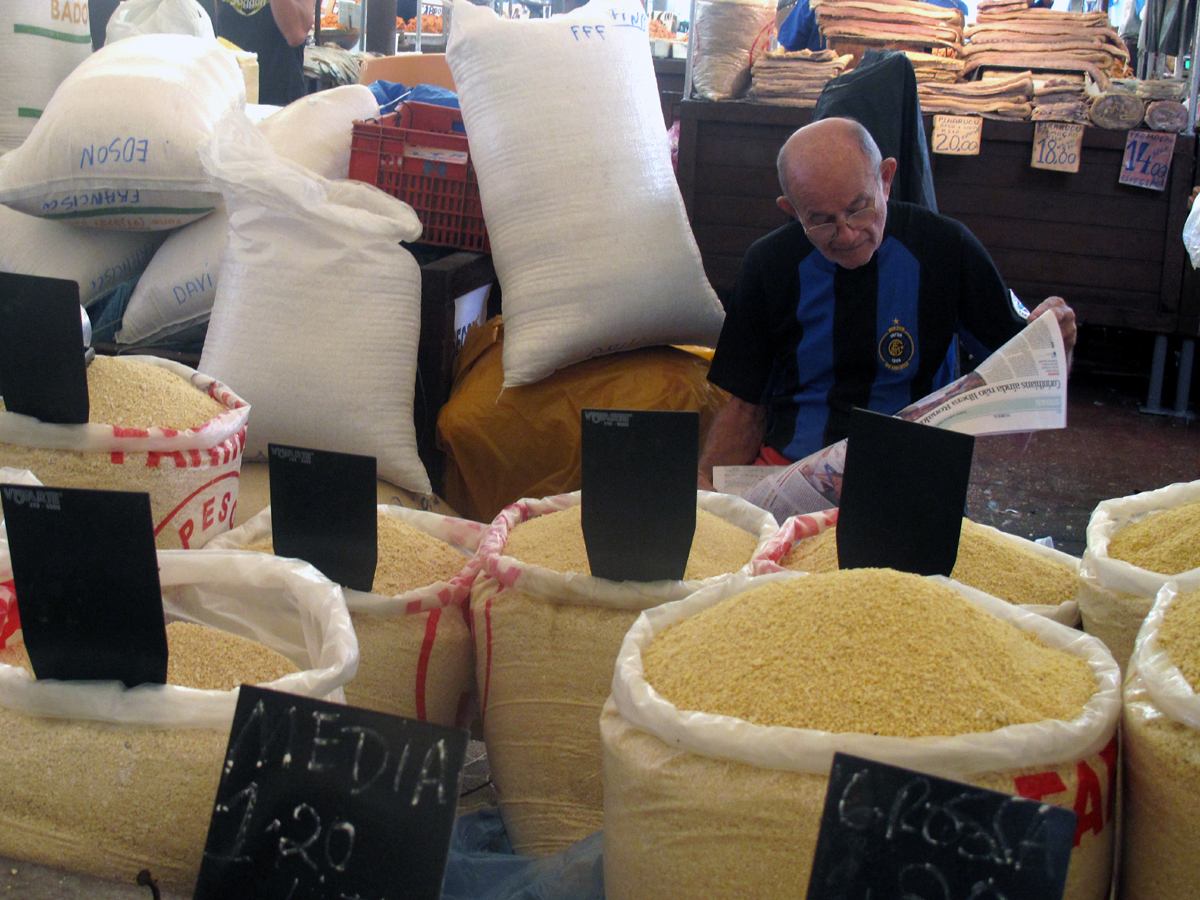
Manioc flour sales stand.

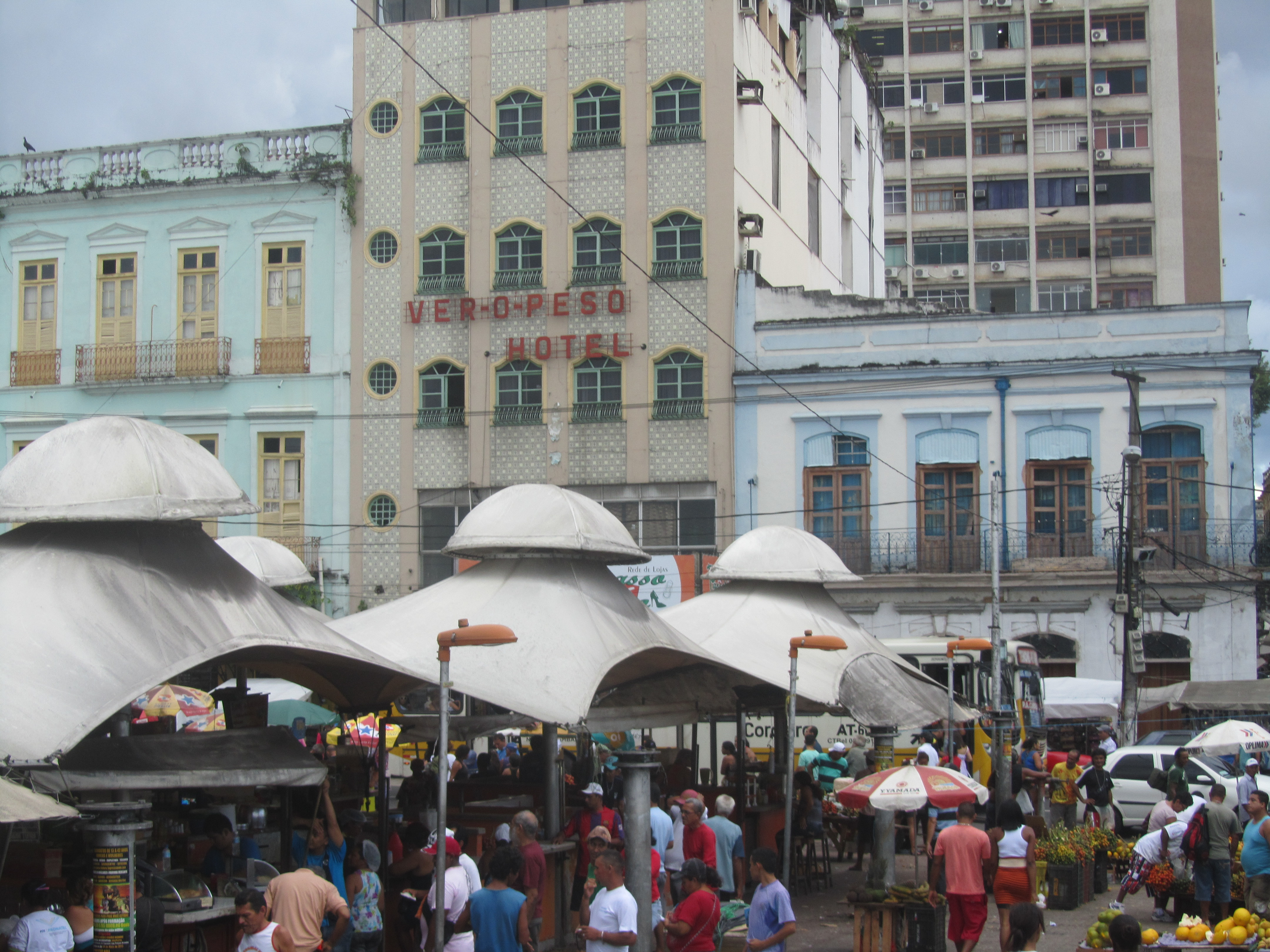
Market stalls at the Ver-o-Peso Market

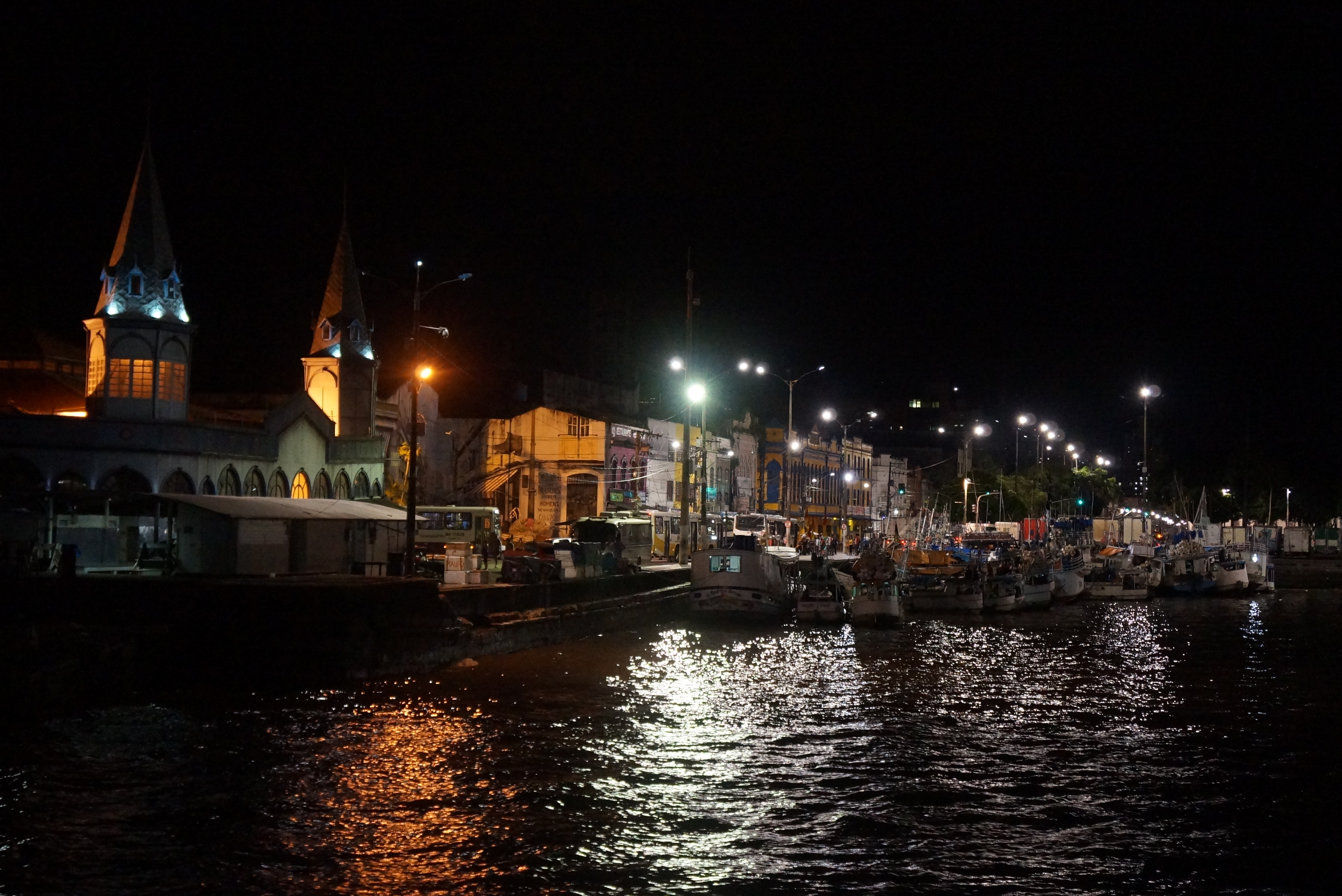

== See also ==
- History of Belém
- Traditional Brazilian medicine
- Feira do Açaí
