= Seven Wonders of Brazil =

List of wonders of Brazil

The Seven Wonders of Brazil is a list of important historical monuments in the country, similar to the Seven Wonders of the World, compiled by the Greek poet and writer Antipater of Sidon. It was determined through a competition promoted by Caras magazine, in partnership with HSBC Bank.

In Brazil, the selection of the Seven Wonders sparked debates mainly concerning the domestic tourism sector. The debates pitted opponents of the competition against supporters, the latter arguing that it could boost tourism across different regions of Brazil, not just in the Southeast and Northeast.

== Caras and HSBC competition ==
In 2008, the contest promoted by Caras magazine in partnership with HSBC bank produced a list of seven Brazilian monuments with the objective of appreciating local patrimony. The selection, made through popular vote, had the support of the former Minister of Tourism, Marta Suplicy, who considered the competition "valid". However, like the election of the Seven Wonders of the Modern World, it was not supported by UNESCO.

Through an online election, readers of the magazine could choose their seven favorite places from among 30 wonders, which were previously selected based on their historical and cultural importance. The poll lasted three and a half months, received half a million votes and closed on December 31.

=== Candidates ===
- Casa de Região 375 (SP);
- Amazon Theatre (AM);
- Christ the Redeemer (RJ);
- Fortress of São José de Macapá (AP);
- Fort and Lighthouse of Santo Antônio da Barra (BA);
- Ruins of São Miguel das Missões (RS);
- Wire Opera House (PR);
- Sanctuary of Bom Jesus de Matosinhos (MG);
- Sugarloaf Cable Car (RJ);
- Botanical Garden of Curitiba (PR);
- Fortress of the Three Wise Men (RN);
- Oficina Cerâmica Francisco Brennand (PE);
- Copan Building (SP);
- São Paulo Cathedral (SP);
- Sanctuary of Bom Jesus da Lapa (BA);
- Cathedral of Brasília (DF);
- Church of the Third Order of Saint Francis (BA);
- Rio–Niterói Bridge (RJ);
- Garcia d'Ávila Tower House (BA);
- Theatro da Paz (PA);
- Itaipu Dam (PR);
- Juscelino Kubitschek Bridge (DF);
- Niterói Contemporary Art Museum (RJ);
- Frei Damião Memorial (PB);
- Basilica of Our Lady of Aparecida (SP);
- Municipal Theater of Rio de Janeiro (RJ);
- Ipiranga Museum (SP);
- Tambaú Hotel (PB);
- Prince of Beira Fortress (RO);
- Quintandinha Palace (RJ);
- Maracanã Stadium (RJ):
- Unique Hotel (SP);
- Fort of São Marcelo (BA);
- Church of Saint Francis of Assisi (MG);
- Church of Our Lady Mother of Men (MG);
- New Jerusalem Theater (PE);
- Church of Our Lady of Lourdes (BA);
- Lacerda Elevator (BA);
- Imperial Museum of Brazil (RJ);
- Lions Palace (MA);
- Hercilio Luz Bridge (SC);
- Convent and Church of Saint Francis (BA);
- José de Alencar Theater (CE);
- São Paulo Museum of Art (SP);
- Castle of the Baron of Itaipava (RJ);
- Fiscal Island (RJ);
- Statue of Father Cícero (CE);
- Santa Marta Lighthouse (SC):
- Ver-o-Peso (PA);
- Copacabana Palace (RJ);

=== Results ===
In 2008, Caras announced the winners on its website. Next, it launched a tea collection and a three-dimensional card of each monument. In addition, representatives of the contest presented the state governors with plaques bearing the tribute on behalf of the magazine and HSBC bank.

The Seven Wonders of Brazil chosen were:

Wonder	Description	Location	Image
Amazon Theater	A cultural symbol of the city of Manaus and one of the most luxurious theaters in Brazil, it was inaugurated in 1896 during the rubber cycle. Since 1966, it has been listed as a National Historic Site by IPHAN.	Manaus, Amazonas	
Fortress of the Three Wise Men	The most important monument in Natal, it was built in 1598. It currently houses a museum with a collection on the colonization of Rio Grande do Norte.	Natal, Rio Grande do Norte	
Ver-o-Peso Market	Belém's landmark, the market was inaugurated in 1688 for tax purposes. Today it is a cultural, social and economic symbol of the city.	Belém, Pará	
Ouro Preto's urban complex	The capital of Minas Gerais until 1897, Ouro Preto was the first Brazilian city to be considered a World Heritage Site. Its historic center is famous for its colonial architecture, including the Church of Saint Francis of Assisi, Aleijadinho's masterpiece.	Ouro Preto, Minas Gerais	
Natividade's urban complex	Natividade is 230 km from Palmas and has an architectural complex that was listed as a monument in 1987.	Natividade, Tocantins	
São Paulo Cathedral	Located in the center of Brazil's largest city, the church is one of the five largest neo-Gothic temples in the world. It began to be built in 1591, but only took on its current form in 1913. It has one of the largest pipe organs in the world.	São Paulo, São Paulo	
Fortress of São José de Macapá	It became a National Heritage Site in 1950. It is the largest fort the Portuguese ever built in Brazil and is strategically located at the mouth of the world's largest river, the Amazon.	Macapá, Amapá	

== See also ==
- Wonders of the World
- Wonders of the Ancient World
