= Guajará Bay =

Bay in Belém, Pará, Brazil

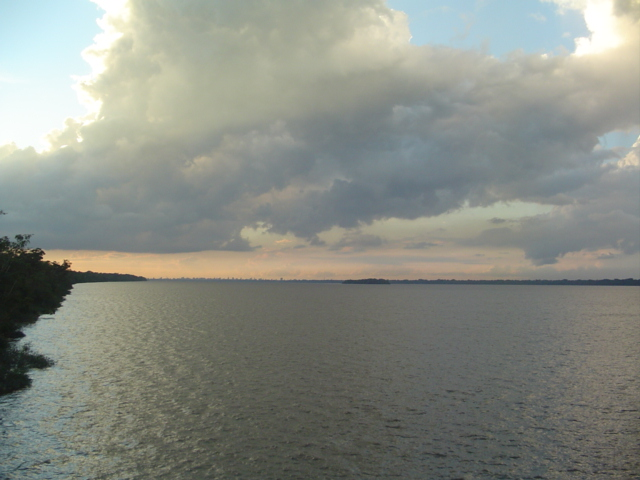
- Interactive map of Guajará Bay
- Location: Belém, Pará; Brazil
- Coordinates: 01°22′45″S 48°30′46″W

Guajará Bay (Portuguese: Baía do Guajará) is formed by the confluence of the mouths of the Guamá and Acará rivers, which border the municipalities of Barcarena and Belém, the capital of Pará. Its waters flow into Marajó Bay and end in the Atlantic Ocean.

== History ==
Formerly called Paraná-Guaçu by the Tupinambás people who inhabited the region, Guajará Bay was the gateway for the Portuguese who wanted to occupy the Captaincy of Grão-Pará. According to the Treaty of Tordesillas, the land belonged to Spain, but the territories were unified by the Iberian Union at the time.

On January 12, 1616, three vessels, the patache Santa Maria da Candelária, the caravelão Santa Maria das Graças, and the large speedboat Assunção, docked where the city of Belém (known as Mairi by the natives) is today. On board were 150 men, including Francisco Caldeira Castelo Branco, Discoverer and First Conqueror of the Amazon (his title at the time), who called the place Feliz Lusitânia. On the site, the engineer-major Francisco Frias Mesquita began the construction, on the east bank of the bay, of the Forte do Presépio, the starting point for the foundation of the city of Santa Maria de Belém do Grão-Pará.

In the following years, the bay was the scene of several battles between the Portuguese, English, Dutch and French. None of these groups managed to settle in the region and were forced to seek land further north, in the Guianas.

== Environment ==
Guajará Bay is home to several ecosystems, such as mangroves, igapós (flooded forests) and floodplain areas. The surrounding vegetation is mainly tropical rainforest.

In addition to its ecological importance, the bay is also very relevant to the local economy. It is used for the navigation of large vessels, which transport goods and passengers, and for fishing, a common activity in the region, with emphasis on artisanal fishing, carried out by traditional communities dependent on the bay's resources.

=== Fishing ===
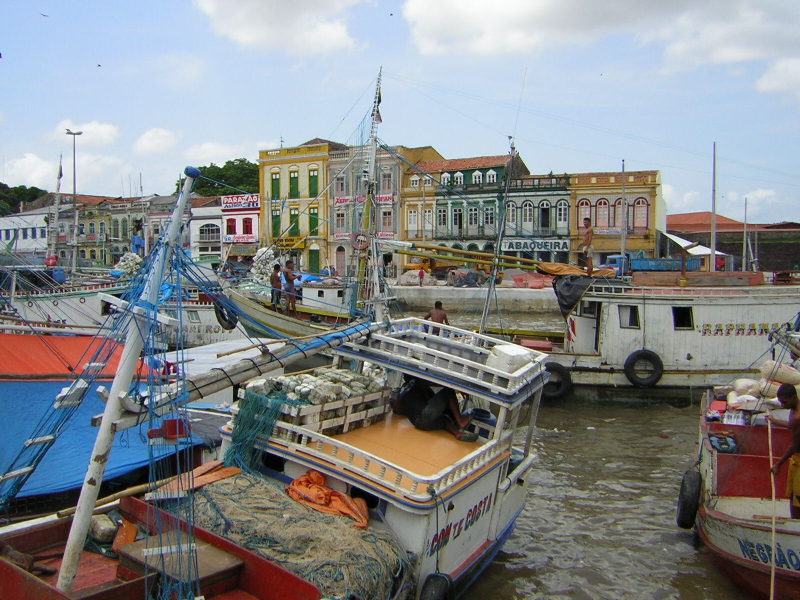
The fishing boats docked in Cidade Velha, a neighborhood in the center of Belém.

Considered to be the most important activity for the Tupinambás, fishing in Guajará Bay represented the survival of this indigenous population.

After the arrival of the Portuguese, the activity intensified, and until the beginning of the rubber cycle in 1879, it formed the basis of the local economy.

Even today, fish from the Guajará Bay are very present in the Pará's traditional cuisine in a variety of dishes, such as Pirarucu, considered by many to be the cod of the Amazon.

== River Círio ==
A river procession takes place on the waters of Guajará Bay every year as part of the Círio de Nazaré celebrations. Created in 1985, the pilgrimage gives riverside dwellers, fishermen and sailors on the bay an opportunity to pay homage to Our Lady of Nazareth, the patron saint of Pará.

Leaving from the port of Icoaraci, hundreds of boats accompany the ship carrying the image of the saint to the port of Belém on a journey that lasts around five hours. Throughout the route, the saint receives homage from the faithful and several rounds of fireworks.

== Tourist attractions ==
Currently, tourism is the most important economic activity in the region. The shores of Guajará Bay offer many options, from historical tours to places of natural beauty.

=== Ver-o-Peso ===
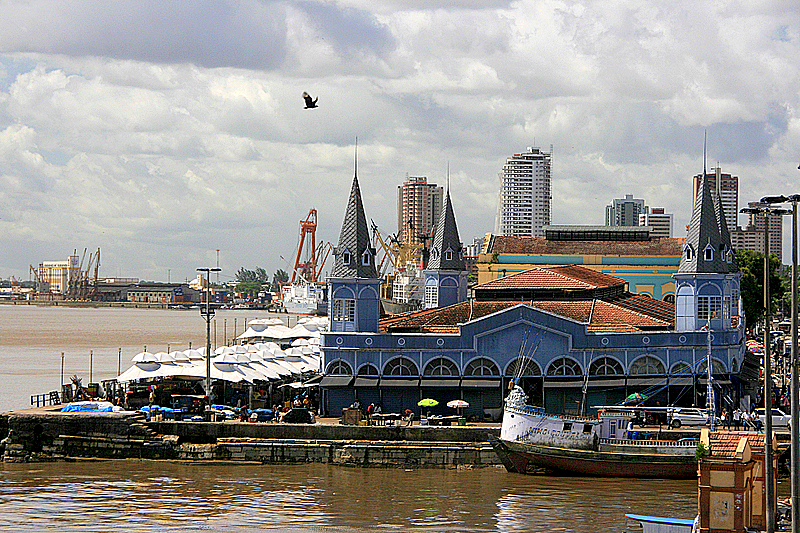
Ver-o-Peso Market, on the shores of Guajará Bay.

The so-called Casas do Ver-o-Peso were created in Brazil in 1614, in Rio de Janeiro, to accurately measure the weight of any goods and collect the tax. In Belém, it was built in 1625 for the same purpose, but was closed down in 1839. Years later, after several changes to the site, the Ver-o-peso Market was created and the city's largest open-air market flourished around it.

The structure was built by La Rocque Pinto & Cia., which won a public tender in 1897, and has an area of 1,197 m^{2} in the shape of a dodecagon. The estimated weight of the structure is 1,133,389 tons and the metal structure is made of vieille-montagne zinc.

=== Mosqueiro ===
The Mosqueiro Island, where Vila do Mosqueiro is located, is an 11,000-hectare piece of land to the north of the city of Belém and one of the region's biggest tourist attractions with around 17 km of beaches.

The name Mosqueiro came from the process of preserving fish created by the Tupinambás indigenous people who inhabited the region, called moqueio.

=== Mangal das Garças ===
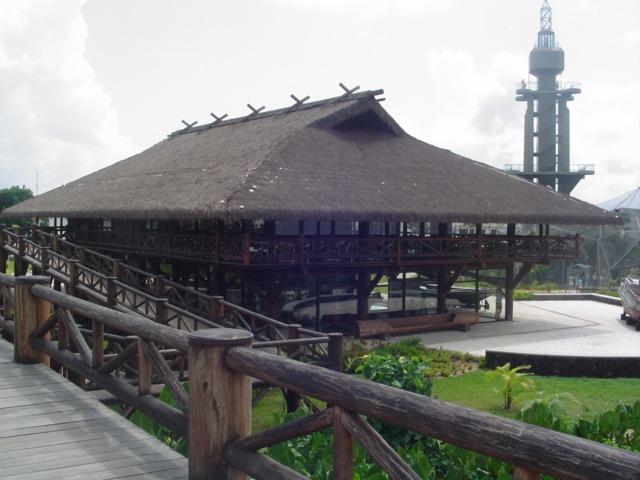
Mangal das Garças Park, with the viewpoint in the background.

Built on the banks of the Guamá River, Mangal das Garças covers an area of 64,300 m^{2}. It is located 3 km from the center of Belém, in the Cidade Velha neighborhood, and was completely renovated. The park was designed and built in harmony with nature and the local biodiversity. Visitors can find wading birds, teals and native turtles, as well as a huge variety of Amazonian plant species. The viewpoint provides a panoramic view of Guajará Bay and the historic center of Belém.

== Management challenges ==
Like many coastal areas around the world, Guajará Bay faces environmental challenges. Water pollution, mangrove degradation and siltation are some of the problems affecting the area. These issues are the result of the disorderly occupation of the shores, the lack of adequate basic sanitation and unregulated human activity in the region.

Government authorities and environmental organizations have been working hard to protect and preserve Guajará Bay, implementing conservation, monitoring and environmental awareness measures. Actions such as cleaning up the water, reforesting degraded areas and creating conservation units are some of the initiatives underway to preserve this important ecosystem.

== Gallery ==
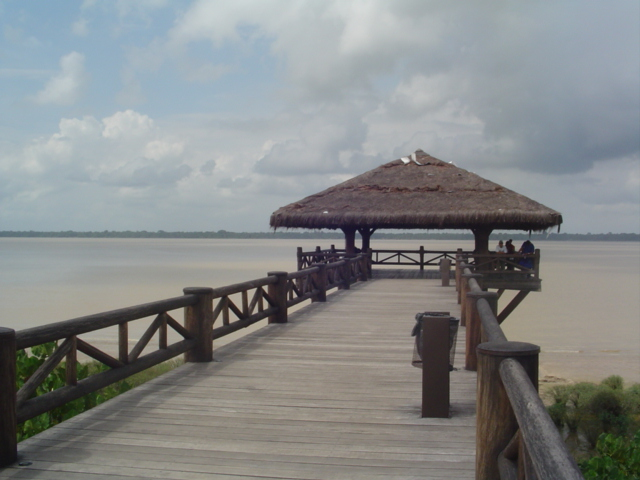
View of Mangal das Garças.

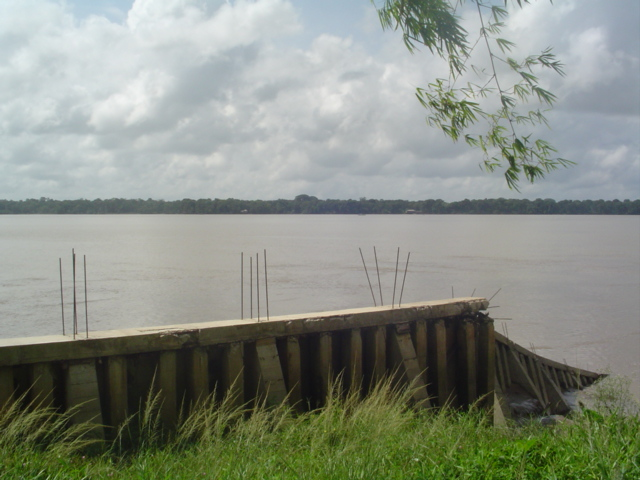
View of Mangal das Garças.

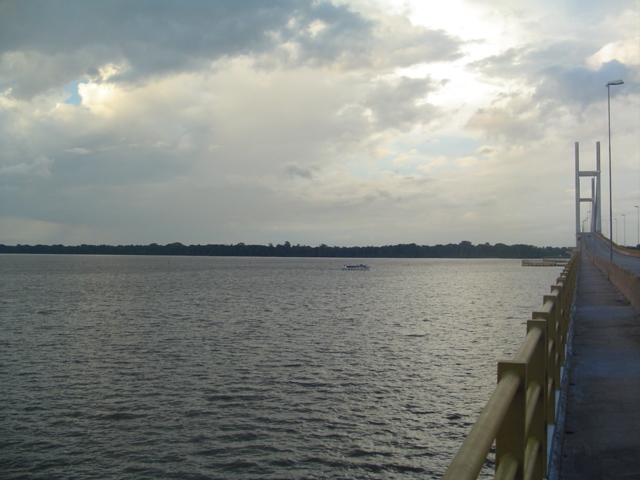
Guajará Bay and the Governador Almir Gabriel Bridge.

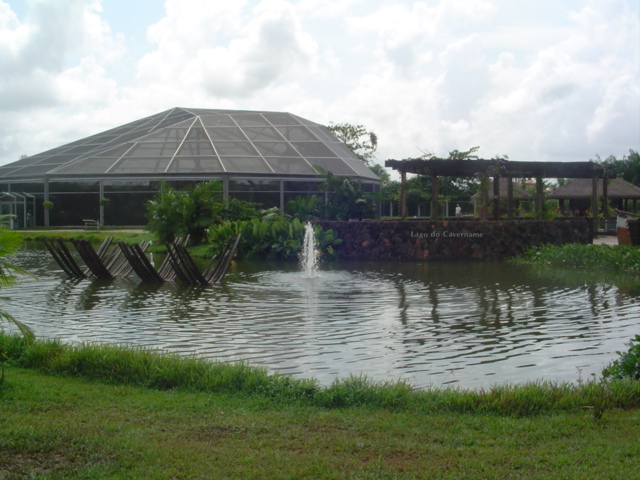
Mangal das Garças Park.

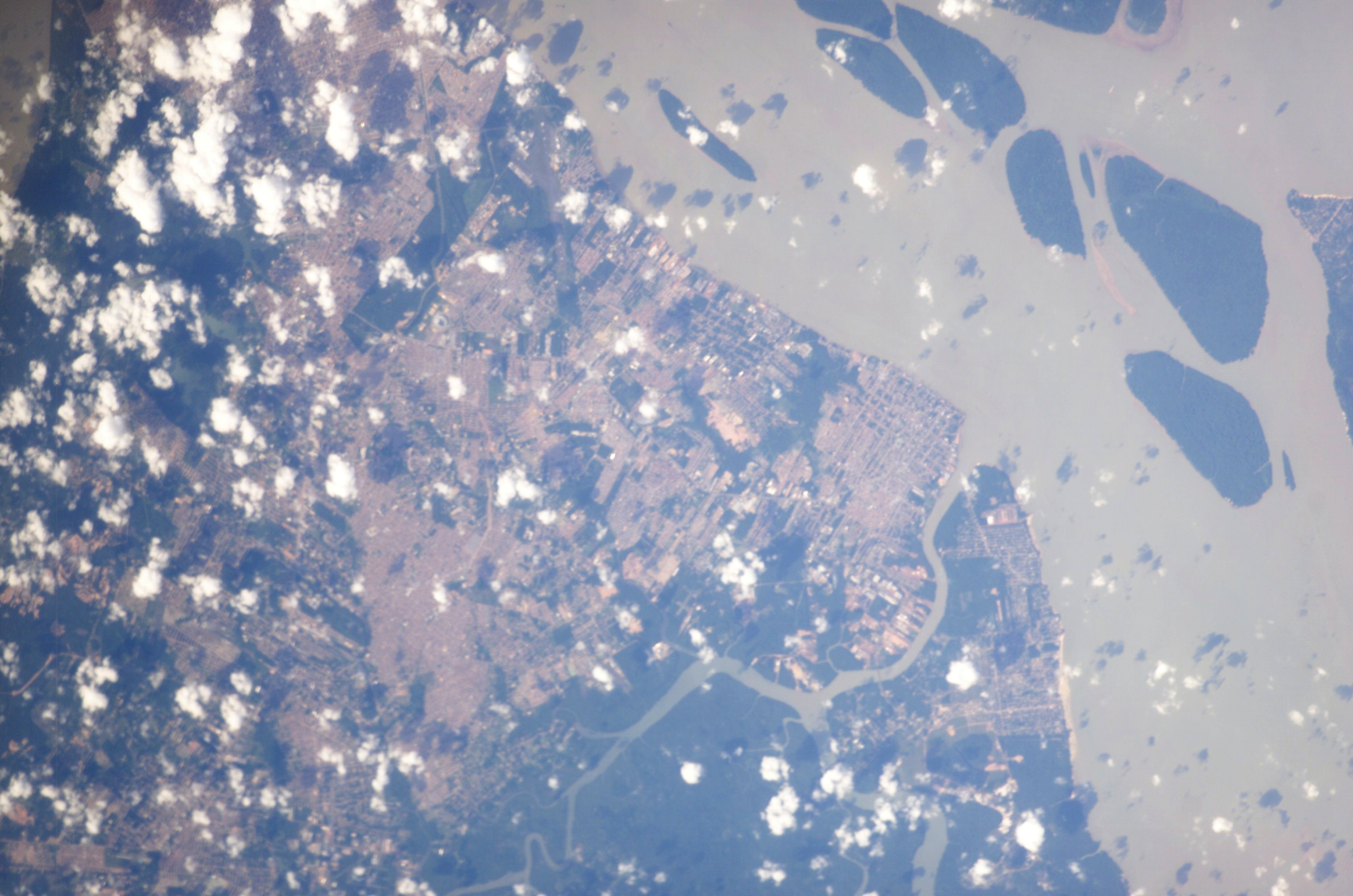
Satellite image of Belém and Guajará Bay.

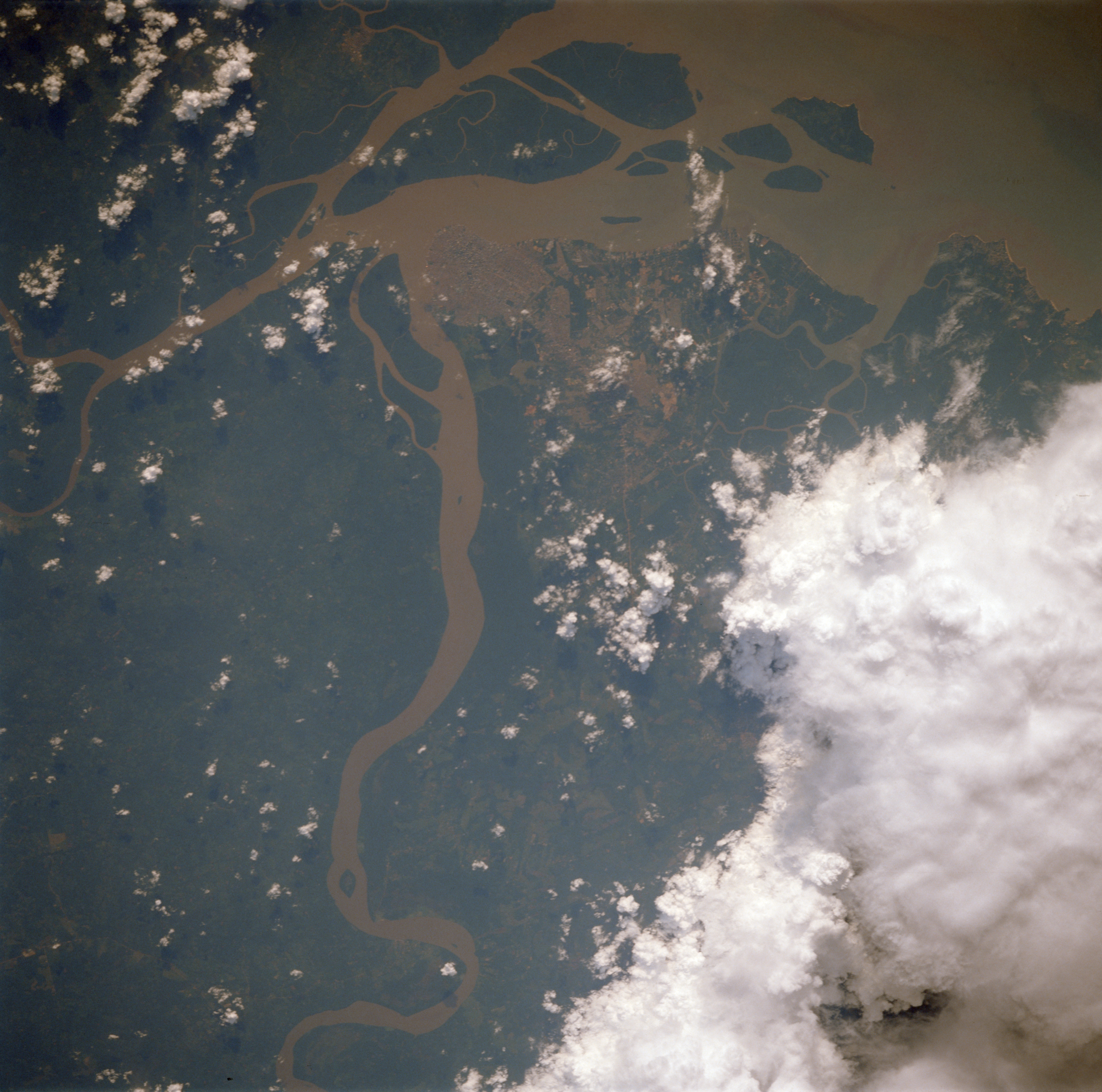
Satellite image of the mouth of the Guamá River, which flows into Guajará Bay.

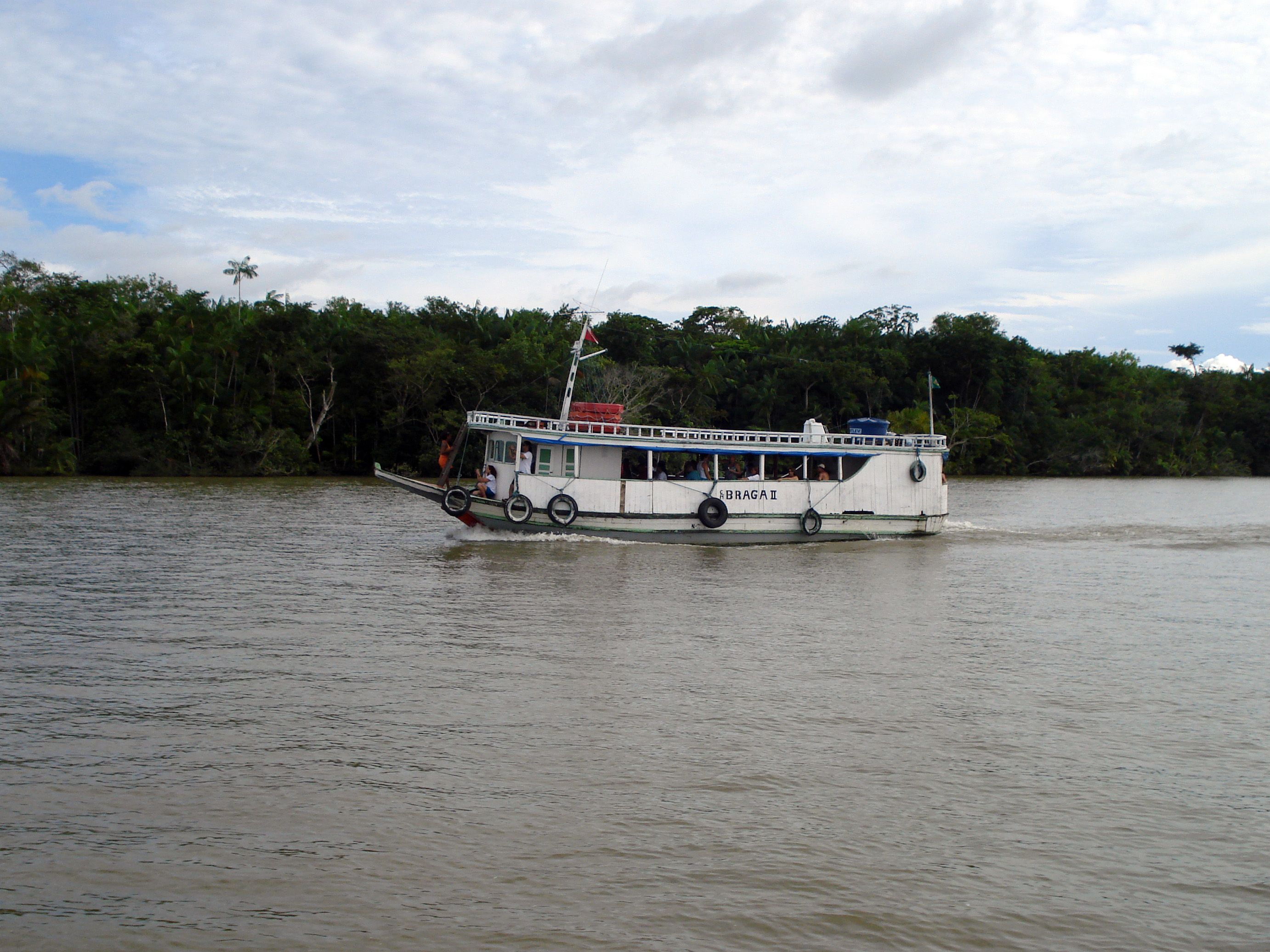
River transportation in Guajará Bay.

== See also ==
- Mosqueiro
- Marajó Bay
- Ver-o-peso Complex
- History of Belém
- Tupinambás Uprising
