= Drogas do sertão =

Type of natural products

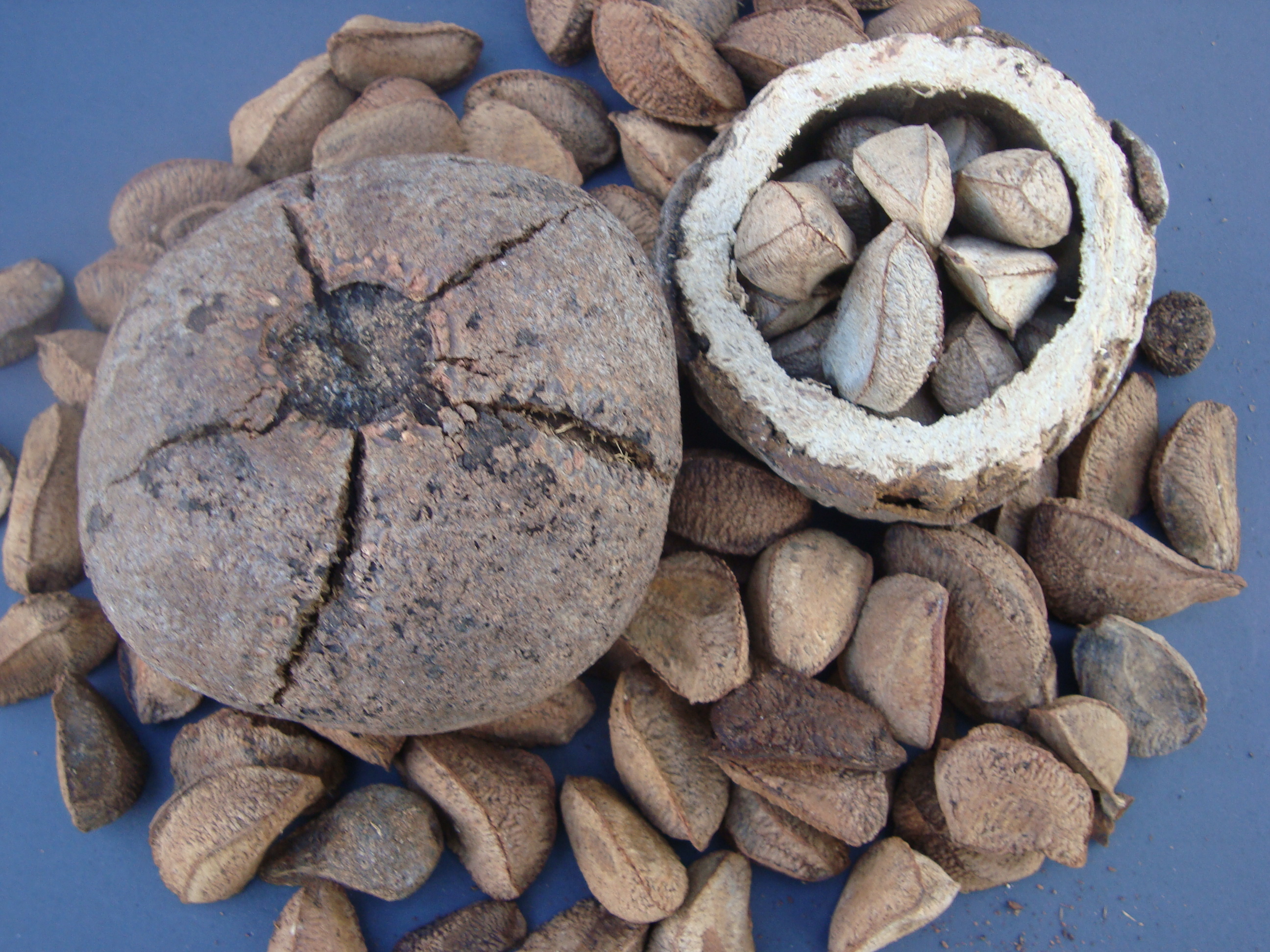
Brazil nut was one of the main drogas do sertão.

Drogas do sertão is the name given by the Portuguese to certain natural products that were extracted from the Amazon rainforest in Colonial Brazil, especially during the time of the bandeirantes. Contrary to the modern use of the word sertão, the term (a shorter form of desertão, meaning "large deserted area") refers to the vast inland areas that were not under control of the Portuguese yet, especially in the Amazon region.

== Main products ==
The drogas do sertão included spices, foods, wood and vegetable oils. The main products were:

- Brazil nut
- Cacao
- Copaiba
- Guarana
- Rosewood
- Urucum

Cocoa became the most lucrative product for the Portuguese, since it was already appreciated by Europeans through Spanish contact with it in Mexico and the Caribbean. Guarana became known for its stimulating and medicinal properties, and copaiba for its aid in wound healing. Rosewood and urucum were used as condiments and natural dyes.

== Historical context ==
Through their contacts with indigenous peoples in the rainforest, the Portuguese became aware of these new products that were unknown in Europe. Since they were comparable in value and function to certain products from Asia, there were heavy disputes between the British, French, Dutch and even some Irish about control of the region.

For the Portuguese, the extraction of the drogas do sertão contributed to the integration of the Amazon region into the colonial system, to the establishment of Atlantic trade routes, to their territorial expansion and to control over the indigenous population. The trade in drogas do sertão preceded the Amazon gold rush and the Amazon rubber cycle, paving the way for these to happen centuries later.
