= São Brás Market =

Historic building in Pará, Brazil

Coordinates: 1.4514°S 48.4683°W

- Mercado de São Brás
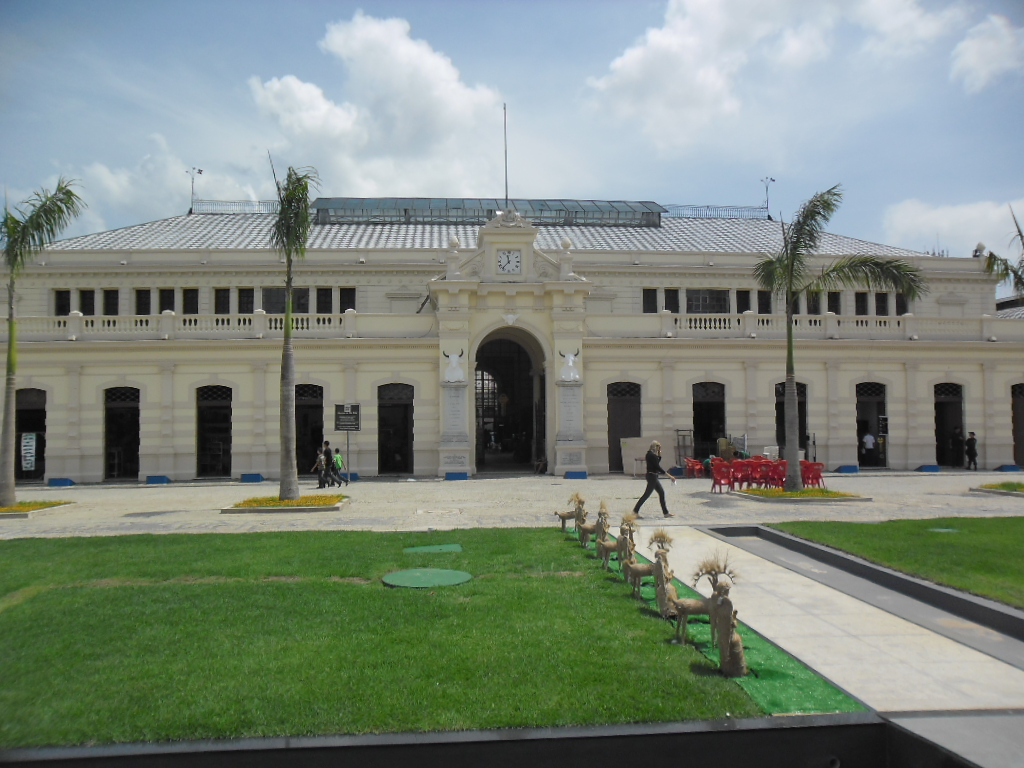
- Interactive map of the São Brás Market area

General information
- Architectural style: Art Nouveau; Neoclassical
- Location: Belém, Pará; Brazil
- Construction started: 1910
- Construction stopped: 1911
- Inaugurated: May 21, 1911

Design and construction
- Architect: Filinto Santoro

The São Brás Market (Portuguese: Mercado de São Brás) is a historic building located in the Brazilian city of Belém, in the state of Pará. It was built during the Amazon rubber cycle. Construction began on May 1, 1910, and was completed on May 21, 1911.

The market was built to accommodate the large amount of trade generated by the Belém-Bragança Railway, whose last stop was in the São Brás neighborhood. It was also designed to expand the city's supply, which until then had been concentrated in the Ver-o-Peso Market. The structure is made from iron and mixes art nouveau and neoclassical elements, with sculptural details also in iron and decorative tiles.

== History ==
At the beginning of the 20th century, Antônio Lemos, the mayor of Belém, granted the land to build the market. Materials and workers were imported from Italy, and the work was executed by the Italian engineer Filinto Santoro, who was also responsible for the Augusto Montenegro Palace and the Gentil Bittencourt School.

In 1988, during the administration of Mayor Fernando Coutinho Jorge, the market underwent a major renovation with significant changes to spatial aspects and use. After the intervention, the current building included spaces for theater, marketing and municipal administration workshops. Due to the acoustics and the amount of traffic, the theater was shut down and the market temporarily closed. The fish market, flanked by kiosks of the same style, form the cultural complex of the São Brás Market.

The second renovation took place between 1998 and 1999 under Mayor Edmilson Rodrigues and included the restoration of the roof, waterproofing and painting. At the time, due to the increase in informal work in the area, street vendors were relocated to the market.

== Preservation ==
The São Brás Market is managed by Belém City Hall through the Municipal Secretariat for the Economy (Secon). The São Brás Market Architectural and Landscape Complex was listed as a historical heritage site by the Pará State Heritage Department on July 2, 1982. The building is currently suffering from poor maintenance by the public authorities. There are evident signs of deterioration in the space, with problems such as leaks in the walls and an accumulation of garbage. Despite the intense flow of people, the area around the building lacks security, which has led to frequent assaults and thefts in Floriano Peixoto Square, located near the market. The poor state of repair of the square also directly affects the market, as it is used as a shelter by homeless people.

=== Structure and services ===
Today, the São Brás Complex is composed of areas including a market, a fish and meat market, handicrafts, a grocery store and a food court. The structure comprises three pavilions with vaulted brick roofs and white marble decoration. It is located close to Almirante Barroso, José Bonifácio and Magalhães Barata avenues.

== See also ==
- History of Belém
- Culture and tourism in Belém
