= Ver-o-Rio =

Public square in Belém, Brazil

- Public square
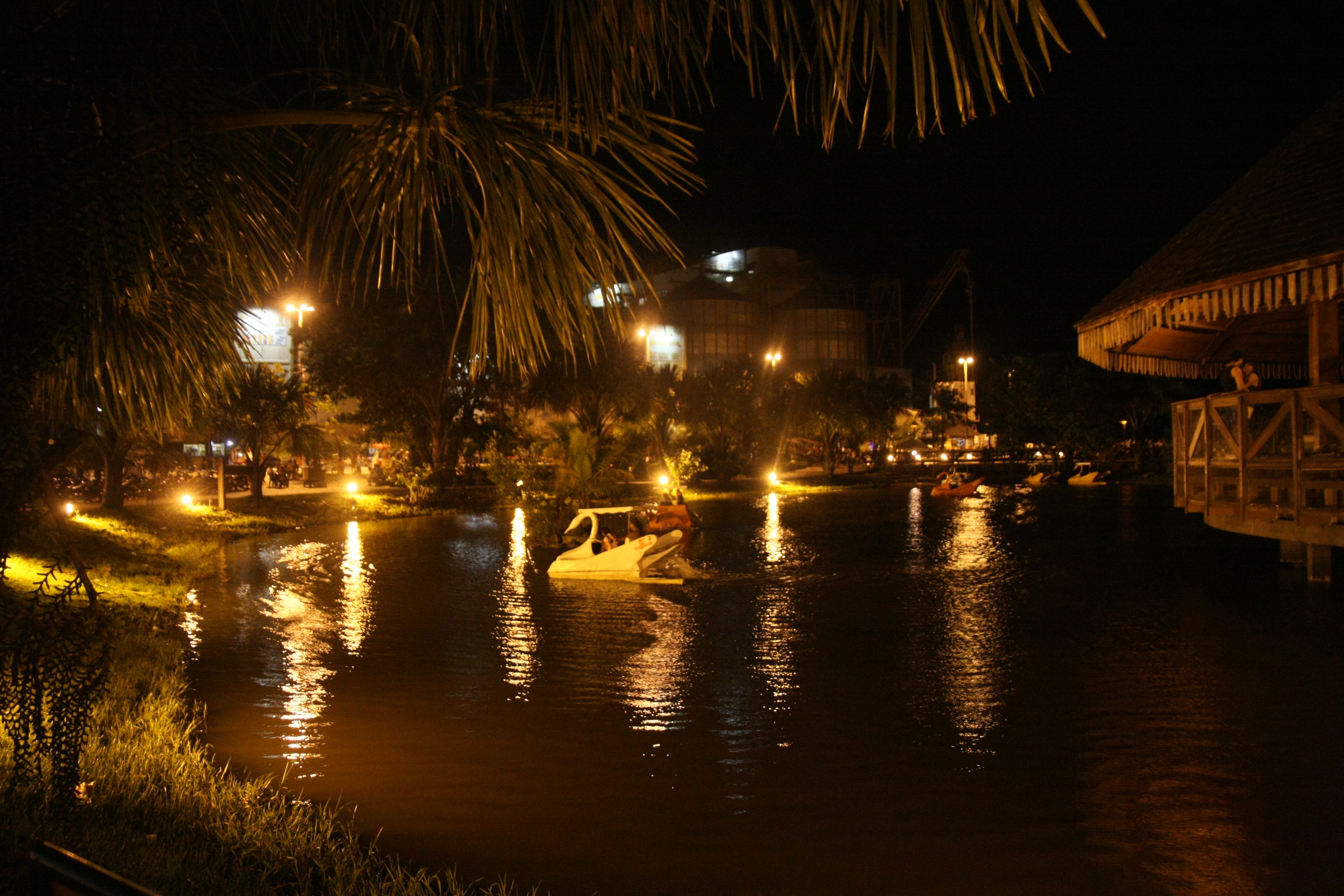
- Ver-o-Rio at night.
- Opened: 1999
- Area: 5,000 m^{2} (54,000 sq ft)
- Location: Belém, Brazil
- Belém, Brazil
- Coordinates: 1°26′11.3″S 48°29′36.1″W

Ver-o-Rio is a tourist complex located in a 5,000-square-meter (54,000 sq ft) Brazilian public square inaugurated in 1999 in the city of Belém (Pará). It is on the shores of Guajará Bay in the Umarizal neighborhood and next to the Center of Social Sciences and Education of the State University of Pará (UEPA).

Also known as “Uma janela para o Rio" (A Window to the River), the place emerged from the "Projeto Ver-o-Rio, Janelas Abertas para as Águas" (Ver-o-Rio Project, Windows Open to the Waters), created to provide contemplative tourism and free access to the edge of the bay.

== History ==
Historically occupied by industries, warehouses, and private ports, Belém's extensive waterfront has undergone changes implemented by the city council to modify its use, integrating the square more closely with the river, which plays a significant role in the region's leisure, transportation, and economic activities." A series of proposals were made, including the “Ver-o-Rio Project, Windows Open to the Waters”, which aimed to “provide the population with contemplative tourism and free access to the waterfront”.

Specifically, the site where the complex stands today was home to the Panair Pier, a hangar, a maintenance structure, and a seaplane airport with a ramp from which daily national and international flights departed between the late 1920s and the mid-1960s when operations ceased.

In 1999, after the area was cleared, the complex was built during the municipal administration of then-mayor Edmilson Rodrigues. It was placed under the administration of the Belém Municipal Tourism Coordination (Belemtur). Similarly, the Estação das Docas (Docks Station) was inaugurated in 2000 in the Campina neighborhood, as part of efforts to integrate the city's urban landscape with the river.

== Characteristics ==
Ver-o-Rio is an area designed for public use, featuring natural landscapes, typical food, musical shows, and a view of Combu Island. The complex has typical food stalls, bars, a stage, a playground, a Portuguese stone sidewalk, and a tide gauge (a device that measures the level of the tide), as well as an indigenous memorial, and has been used as a venue for water sports and has served as the starting or finishing point for rowing competitions.

== See also ==
- Culture and tourism in Belém (Pará)
- History of Belém
- Estação das Docas
