= Culture and tourism in Belém =

Culture and tourism in Belém, the capital of Pará, is influenced by indigenous people and foreign immigrants, who manifest themselves through religious manifestations, gastronomy, folklore, dances, music, theaters, museums, among others. Belém stands out as a great tourist destination in Brazil, creating an excellent opportunity for travel investment.

== Cultural sites ==
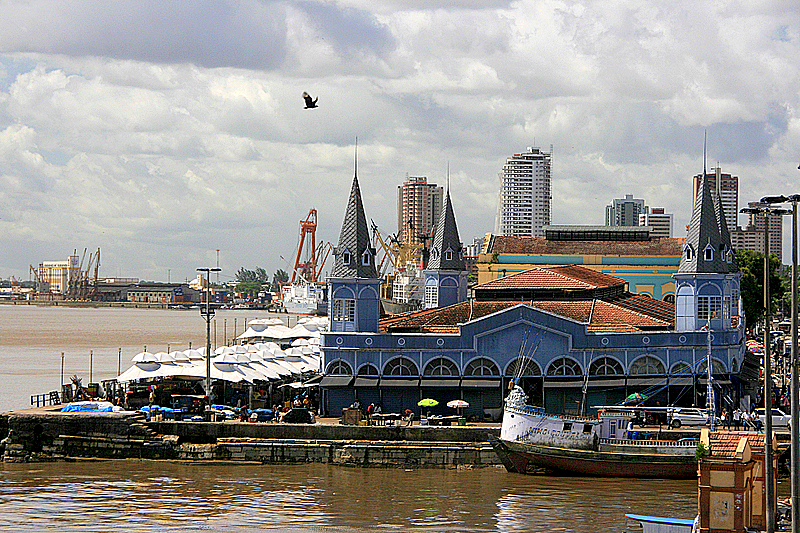
Ver-o-Peso.

=== Main tourist attractions ===
- Bioparque Amazônia (1989): private park created by doctor Jorge Aarão Monteiro;
- Belém's cable car: technology implemented in the Belle Époque era;
- House of the Eleven Windows (18th century): located next to the Presépio Fort, it was built by sugar mill owner Domingos da Costa Bacelar;
- Feliz Lusitânia Complex (1616): a Portuguese colonial settlement created by Captain Francisco Caldeira Castelo Branco on the shores of Guajará Bay. Initial nucleus of Belém;
- Ver-o-Peso Complex (1625): started with the Casa de Haver-o-Peso (demolished in 1899) and it is now a complex composed of the fish and meat markets, the Solar da Beira, the Ladeira do Castelo, the Boulevard Castilhos França, the Clock Square, the Dock, the Açai Fair and Dom Pedro II Square. In 1977, the complex was listed as a historic site by the National Institute of Historic and Artistic Heritage (IPHAN);
- Mangueirão (1978);
- Estação das Docas (2000): multi-event convention center and restaurants. It has a modern waterway terminal, the Amazon River, with a floating dock capable of holding up to four 70-foot boats. There are several daily river trips along Belém's waterfront and islands departing from the terminal;
- Hangar Centro de Convenções e Feiras da Amazônia (2007): a convention and multi-event center with a total area of 64,000 m^{2}, 25,000 m^{2} of which is built up and integrated into the Amazonian environment. It is equipped with the latest technology and prepared for any type of event, such as fairs, congresses, conventions, meetings, seminars, symposiums and exhibitions;
- Rodrigues Alves Park (1883);
- Mangal das Garças (2005): located on the banks of the Guamá River, in the center of the historic area, the park is the result of the revitalization of a 40, 000m² area around the Navy Arsenal;
- Paraense Emílio Goeldi Museum (1911): created on October 6, 1866, it is the oldest research institution in the Amazon region;
- Icoaraci waterfront: one of Belém's most beautiful tourist attractions;
- Residence Park (circa 1910): the official residence of the state's governors, it is now the headquarters of Pará's Executive Secretariat for Culture (SECULT);
- Sebastião Sodré da Gama Planetarium (1999): linked to Pará State University;
- Theatro da Paz (1878): built with funds from latex exports during the rubber cycle;
- Ver-o-Rio: an area of 5,000 square meters facing Guajará Bay that combines contemplation of nature with practicality in the use of urban space;
- Tancredo Neves Cultural and Tourist Center - CENTUR (1986): multi-event convention center and library.

=== Historical centers ===
- Cidade Velha: also known as the Historic Center of Belém, it houses buildings from Brazil's colonial period. It is one of the most important historical and cultural heritage sites in Pará. The neighborhood, which is home to the Feliz Lusitânia Complex, was founded with the construction of the Presépio Fort, today called Castelo Fort, erected at the behest of the Portuguese Crown at the beginning of the 16th century. The area includes Rua da Ladeira, Belém's first street, which connects the Açaí Fair to Dom Frei Caetano Brandão Square and offers simple bars and restaurants. Another famous place in the neighborhood is the Clock Square, where there is a 12-meter-high English clock built in the 1930s. The area is also home to the Our Lady of Grace Cathedral, Dom Pedro II Square, Church of Our Lady of Mercy, the City Hall building and Mangal das Garças.
- Engenho Murucutu: the ruins of an old steam-powered sugar cane mill. It was completed in the 18th century and destroyed during the Cabanagem regime. One of the highlights is the Chapel of Our Lady of the Conception (1711), built in the neoclassical style and designed by Antônio José Landi.

=== Museums ===
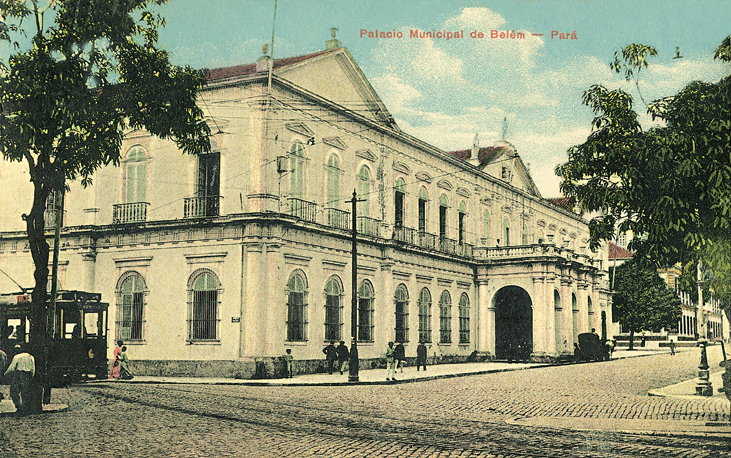
Belém Museum of Art.

- Paraense Emílio Goeldi Museum: a world reference in the Amazon;
- Corvette Solimões Museum: the first museum ship in the North region;
- Museum of the Eleven Windows;
- Museum of the First Boundary Demarcation Commission;
- Museum of the Santa Casa de Misericórdia;
- Museum of the Federal University of Pará;
- Museum of Gems of Pará;
- Belém Museum of Art;
- CCBEU Museum of Art;
- Belém Museum of Popular Art;
- Pará Museum of Sacred Art;
- Círio Museum;
- Pará State Museum;
- Presépio Fort Museum;
- Judiciary Museum;
- Amazon Naval Museum;
- Navigation Museum;
- Belém Port Museum;

=== Theaters ===
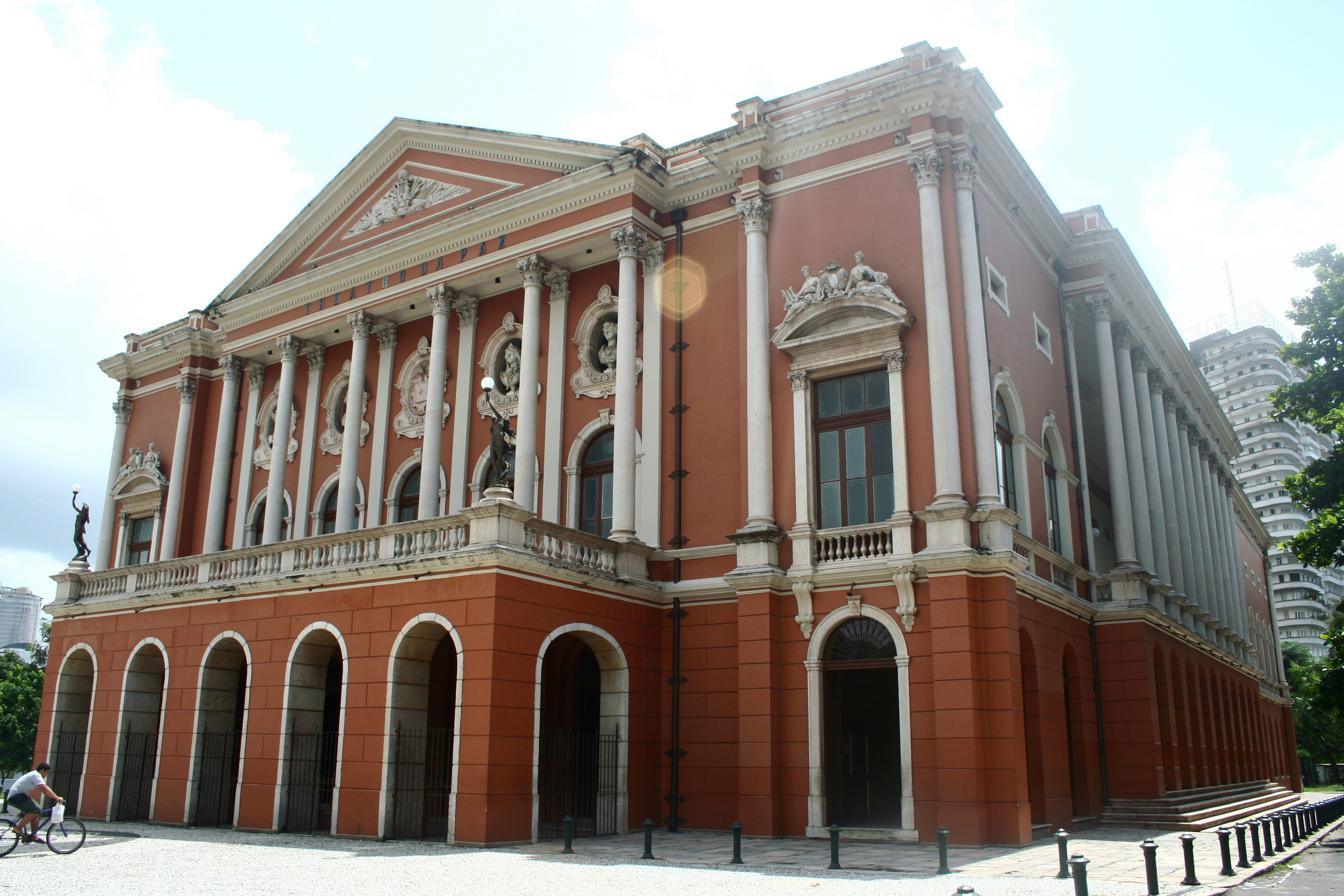
Theatro da Paz.

- Theatro da Paz;
- Waldemar Henrique Experimental Theater;
- Gabriel Hermes Theater (SESI Theater);
- SESC Boulevard Cultural Center;
- Margarida Schivasappa Theater at CENTUR;
- Maria Sylvia Nunes Theater;
- Gasômetro Station Theater;

=== Palaces ===
- Antônio Lemos Palace;
- Augusto Montenegro Mansion;
- Bibi Ferreira Palace;
- Bolonha Mansion;
- Lauro Sodré Palace;
- Pinho Mansion;
- Old Palace;
- Belém Palace;

=== Monuments and memorials ===
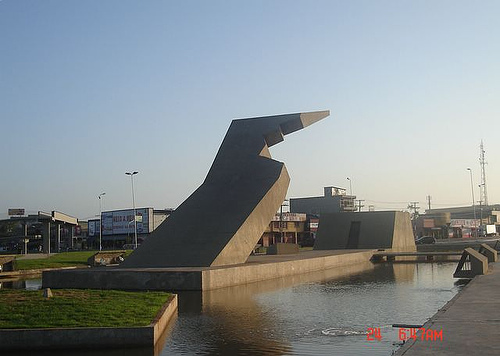
Cabanagem Memorial.

- Monument to Pedro Teixeira;
- Monument to Admiral Tamandaré;
- Monument to José da Gama Malcher;
- Monument to Lauro Sodré;
- Monument to the Republic;
- Monument to Friar Dom Caetano Brandão;
- Monument to General Gurjão;
- Monument to Carlos Gomes;
- Monument to Indigenous People;
- Monument to João Paulo Gaia;
- Cabanagem Memorial;
- Magalhães Barata Memorial;
- Porto Memorial;
- People's Memorial;
- Solar Barão do Guajará;
- Solar Barão do Guamá;
- Solar da Beira;

=== Squares ===
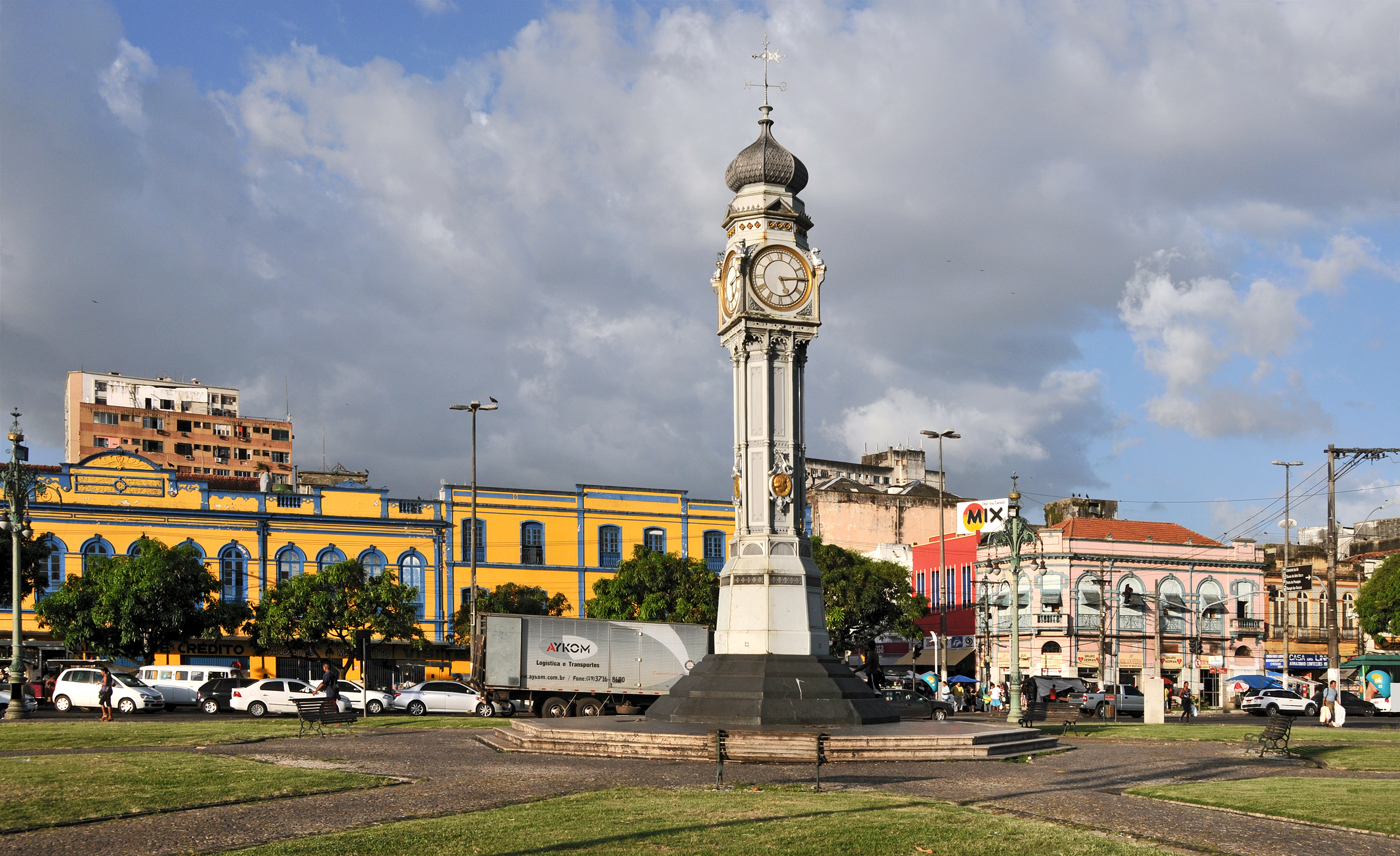
Clock Square.

Belém is famous for its large, tree-lined squares, including some designed with elements of European architecture. Today there are 236 squares in the city, including:

- Republic Square: one of the oldest and most important in the municipality. It is surrounded by the Theatro da Paz and the Waldemar Henrique Experimental Theater, as well as the UFPA Arts Center and the Bar do Parque. The square contains several mango trees and holds cultural events and a variety of handicraft fairs every weekend;
- Batista Campos Square;
- Rui Barbosa Square;
- Clock Square;
- Fisherman's Square: a large popular space located in front of Guajará Bay that embellishes the Ver-o-Peso Complex;
- Sanctuary Square;
- Amazonas Square;
- Princesa Isabel Square (Tourist Terminal);
- Magalhães Barata Square;
- Valdemar Henrique Square;
- Dom Pedro II Square.

== Cooking ==
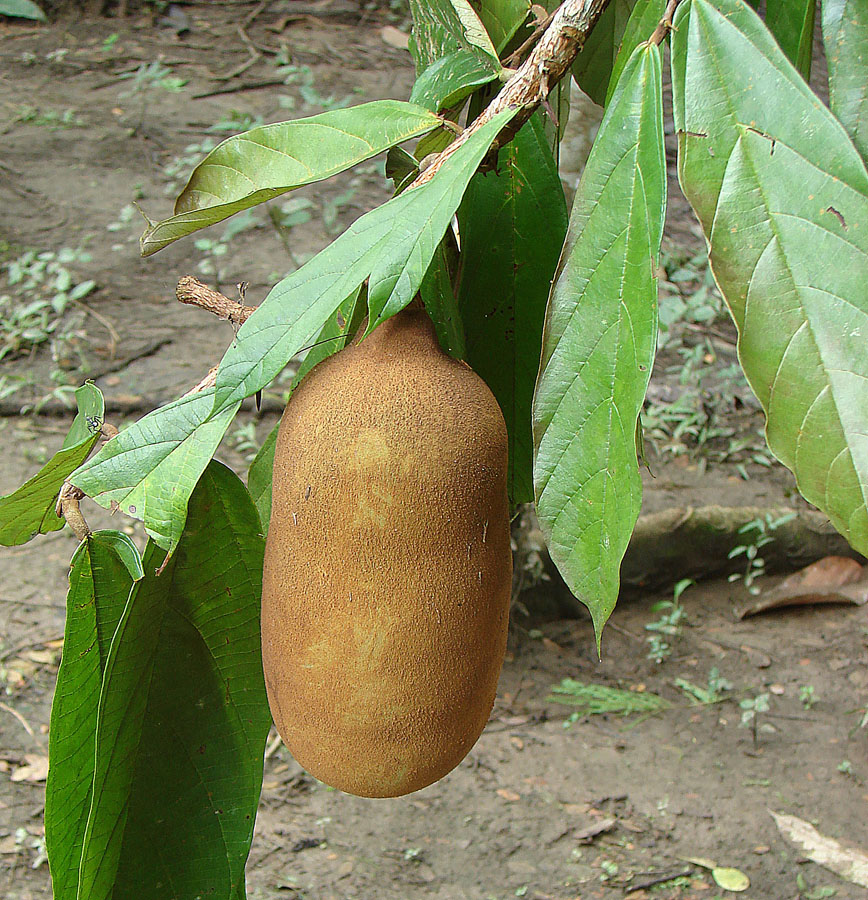
Cupuassu.

The cuisine of Belém has a strong indigenous influence and includes typical dishes such as duck in tucupi sauce with jambu, tacacá, maniçoba and açaí. The elements found in the region form the basis of their dishes. With more than a hundred edible species, regional fruits can be found at Ver-o-Peso, open-air fairs and supermarkets around the city. They are directly responsible for the flavor of the desserts that enrich the food of Pará. Highlights include: açaí, bacaba, bacuri, cupuassu, Brazil nuts, bacuri, pupunha, tucumã, nance, pequi and yellow mombin.

== Music ==
The most popular rhythms are brega pop, tecno brega, carimbó, lundu, siriá and fandango.

== Sports ==
The main football clubs are Clube do Remo and Paysandu Sport Club, known for their rivalry. Another traditional club in Pará is Tuna Luso Brasileira, founded by the Portuguese community in Belém. There are also other smaller groups competing in the championship, such as Sporting Maracanã, Pedreira, Pinheirense, Sport Belém, Sport Real, Tiradentes, Carajás and Vila Rica.

Remo versus Paysandu, the Belém derby, has been played since June 10, 1914. With more than 700 editions, it is considered the biggest derby in the North of Brazil, surpassing any other national match. The arena, known as the Mangueirão, was extensively renovated in 2002.

== Religion ==
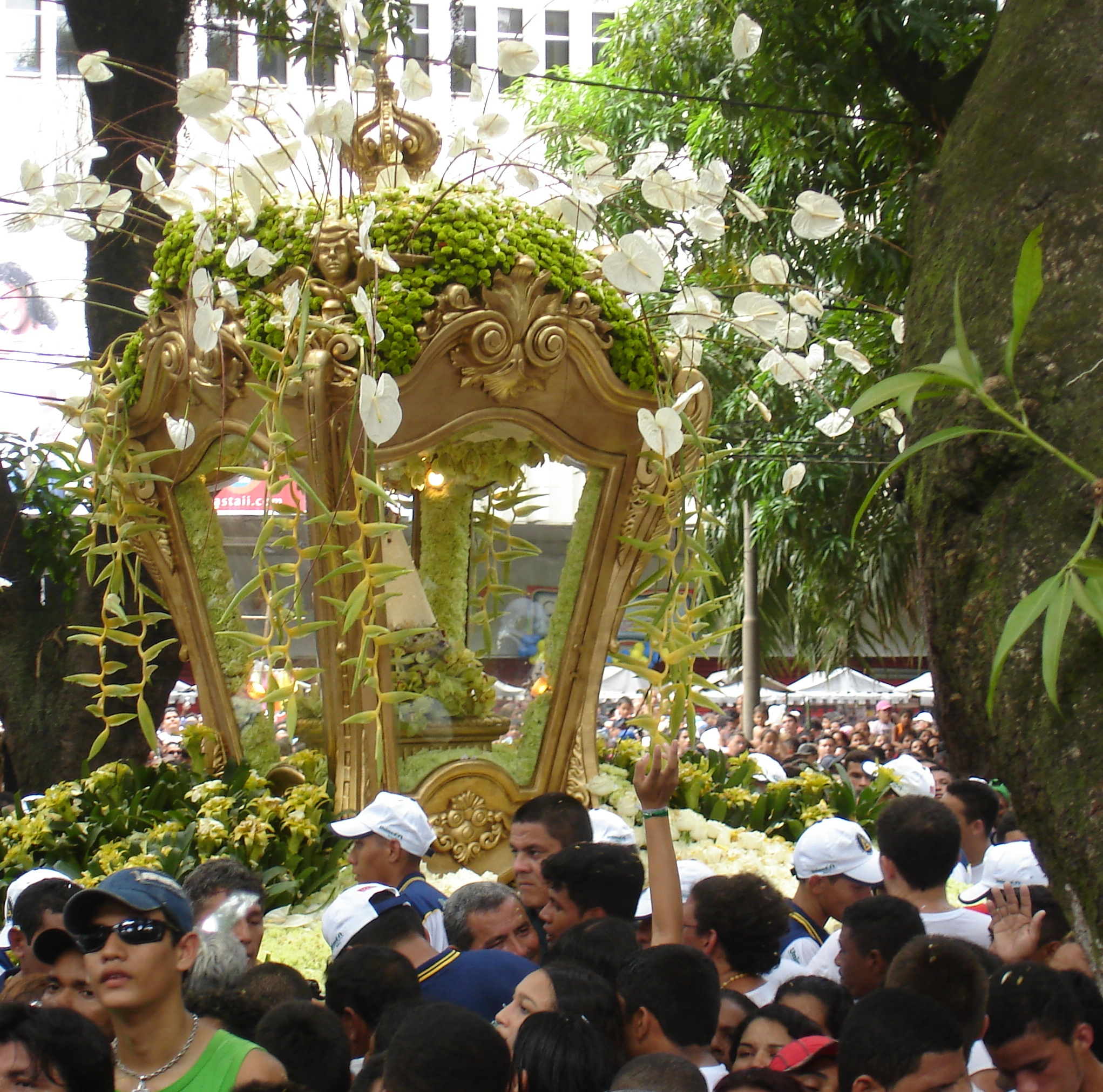
Círio de Nazaré.

Belém hosts the Círio de Nazaré, the religious festival with the largest procession in Brazil, which takes place every year on the second Sunday of October and brings together around two million faithful. The feast in devotion to Our Lady of Nazareth, celebrated in Belém since 1793, is the biggest Christian festivity in the country and the largest Catholic procession in the world. Nowadays, the manifestations of profane and religious devotion last for fifteen days during the so-called Nazarene season. The most important highlights of this event are:

- River Pilgrimage;
- Road Pilgrimage;
- Motorcycle Pilgrimage;
- Transfer;
- Círio Procession.

=== Catholics ===
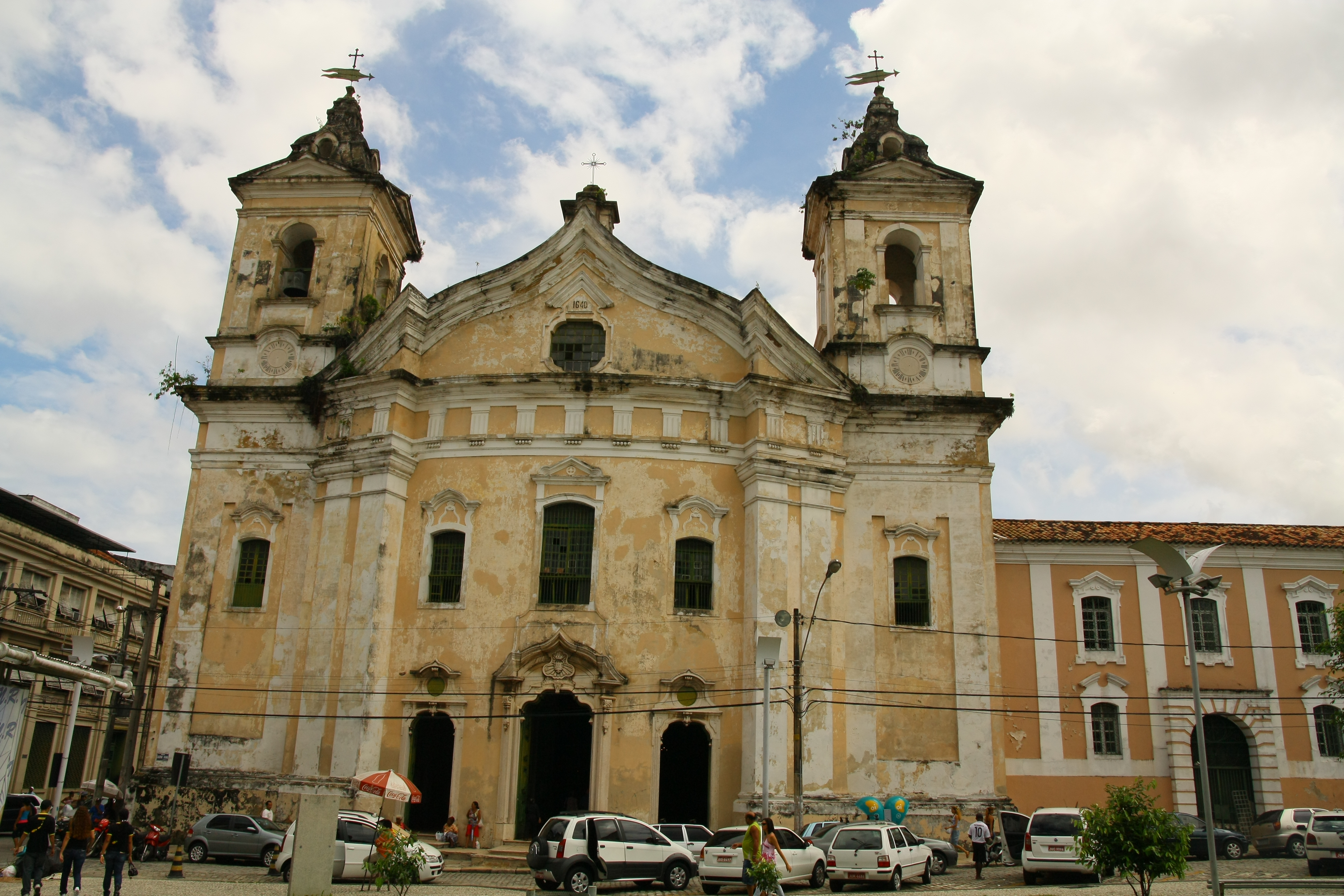
Church of Our Lady of Mercy.

Belém has countless churches, chapels and shrines, including the following:

- Our Lady of Grace Cathedral (1771): built in the Amazonian Baroque style, it is currently the seat of the archbishopric of Belém. Its gold-plated altar was donated by Pope Pius XI and, on its ten side altars, instead of sacred pieces, there are beautiful paintings;
- Basilica of Our Lady of Nazareth of Exile (1909): the only basilica in the Brazilian Amazon. Its history, symbolism and religious importance have a profound influence on the religious community of Pará. On May 31, 2006, the Archdiocesan Marian Shrine was renamed the Basilica of Our Lady of Nazareth;
- Church and College of St. Alexander (1719): built in the Amazonian Baroque style to house the archbishopric of Belém, it was recently restored to house the Museum of Sacred Art;
- Church of Our Lady of Mount Carmel (1696): Belém's oldest church. It was restored in the 18th century by the Italian architect Antonio Landi and has beautiful works of art and a silver altar inlaid with semi-precious stones. It has a neoclassical style mixed with baroque;
- Church of Our Lady of Mercy (1763): one of the few churches in Brazil with a convex facade and numerous bronze sacred works. Several Cabanagem battles took place in the church;
- Church of Saint Anne (1782): construction began in 1753 and was completed in 1782. It was designed by Antonio Landi, has a distinctive Italian style and a beautiful central dome;
- Church of Our Lady of the Rosary (1796): also designed by Antonio Landi and built by the Brotherhood of Our Lady of the Rosary of the Black People at the end of the 18th century. Today, it is one of the best preserved churches in Belém;
- Church of Our Lady of the Holy Trinity (1814): at the beginning of the 19th century, the desire to build a church in honor of the Holy Trinity intensified in José Abranches, who was already 58 years old. The temple was completed in 1814;
- Church of St. John the Baptist (1777): small octagonal church designed by Antonio Landi. It displays beautiful sacred pieces inside and is in a good state of repair;
- Parish of St. Francis of Assisi (1907): built in the São Braz neighborhood by the Capuchin order, who needed a place in Pará to celebrate the feasts of St. Francis;
- Church of São Raimundo Nonato (1917): built in the medieval style during the peak of the rubber cycle, in the Umarizal neighborhood. It stands out for its fifteen-meter tower and its beautiful floors and century-old stained glass windows;
- Chapel and Convent of St. Anthony (1736): examples of 18th century Iberian and Franciscan artistic culture. Its severe and solid structure was built on the shore of Guajará Bay and the current distance between the building and the bay is due to the landfill and reconstruction carried out in 1736;
- Chapel of Our Lady of the Miraculous Medal (1891): one of the first buildings during the occupation of the Umarizal neighborhood. It is currently in a good state of repair.

=== Protestants ===
The city has a large number of Protestant churches, the main ones being: Assembly of God, Seventh-day Adventist Church, International Grace of God Church, Universal Church of the Kingdom of God, Foursquare Church, Baptist Church, Church of Jesus Christ of Latter-day Saints, Christian Congregation in Brazil and others. The First Assembly of God in Brazil was founded in Belém.

== Events ==
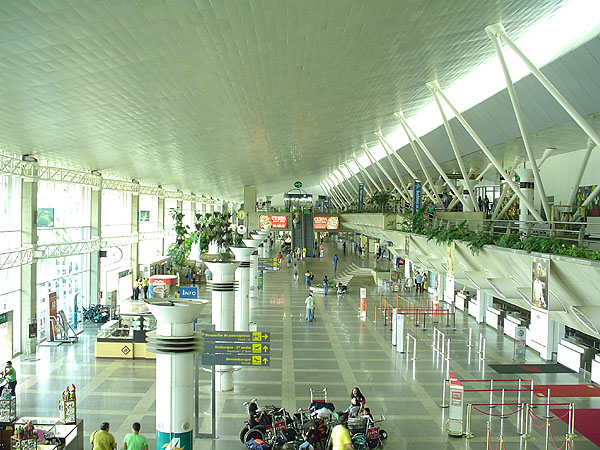
Belém/Val-de-Cans International Airport.

Due to being the oldest city in the Amazon and having the International Airport with numerous national and international connections, Belém is the stage for major events in the region, from local to international celebrations. The city has large fixed local events, such as the Círio de Nazaré (the largest religious feast in the country), the Amazon Book Fair (the 4th largest fair of its kind in the country), Supernorte (the greatest business event in the north of the country) and FITA - International Tourism Fair of the Amazon, among others.

Currently, Belém has the Hangar Centro de Convenções e Feiras da Amazônia, where various types of events can be held, and the Mangueirão, one of the most complete stadiums in the country, as well as multipurpose spaces in various hotels, private centers and spaces managed by the public sector.

== Official holidays ==
=== Municipal holidays ===
Date	Name
January 12	Belem's anniversary
2nd Sunday in October	Círio de Nazaré
December 8	Immaculate Conception

=== State holidays ===
Date	Name
August 15	Accession of Pará to Independence

=== Federal holidays ===
Date	Name
January 1	Universal Fraternity Day
April 21	Tiradentes Day
May 1	Workers' Day
September 7	Independence Day
October 12	Our Lady of Aparecida Day
November 2	All Souls' Day
November 15	Proclamation of the Republic
December 25	Christmas

== See also ==
- History of Belém
