= Solar da Beira =

Brazilian historic building

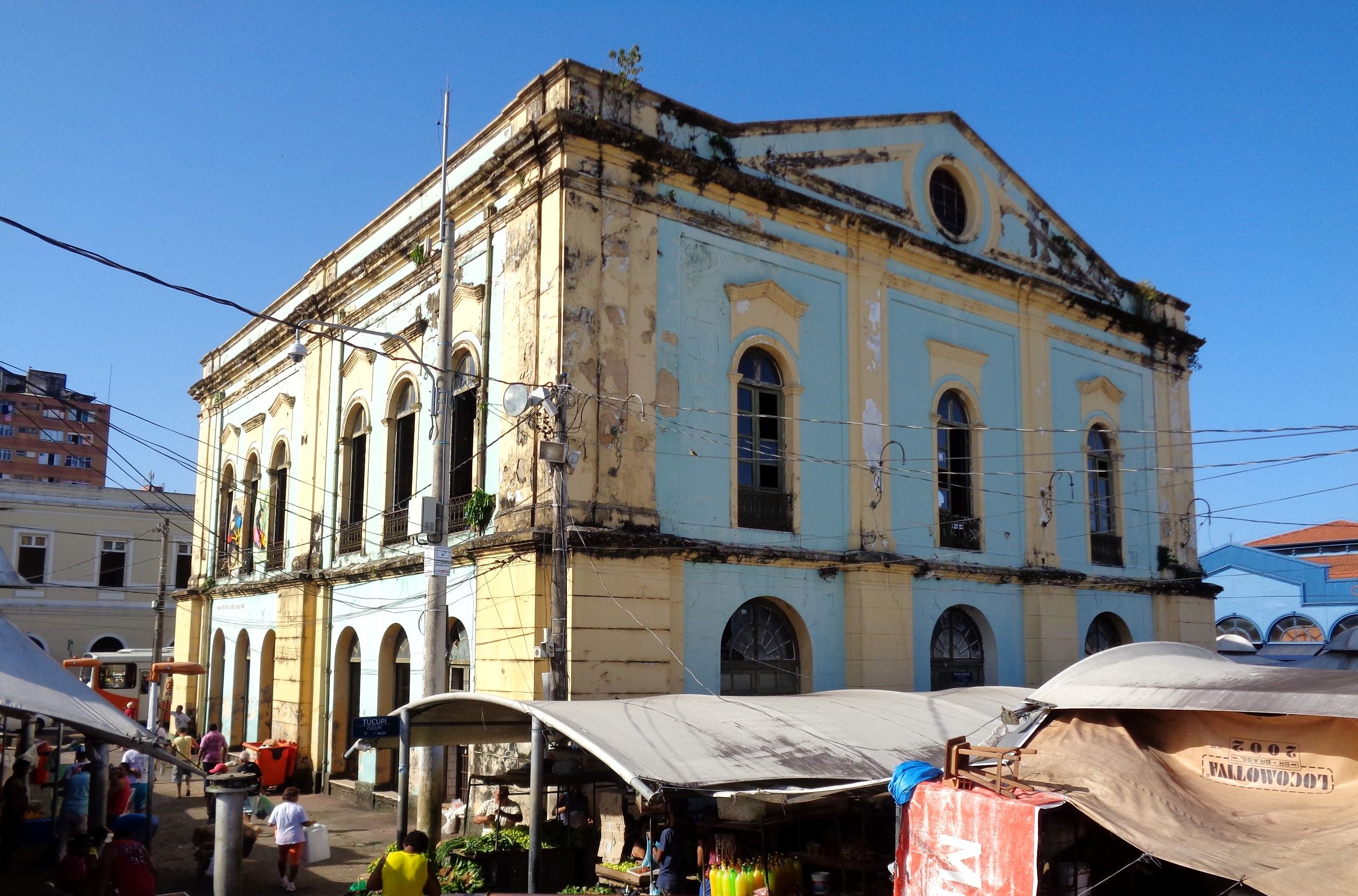
- Solar da Beira in the Ver-o-Peso Complex

- Location within Brazil

General information
- Architectural style: Neoclassicism
- Location: Belém, Pará; Brazil
- Coordinates: 1°27′07″S 48°30′12″W
- Completed: 19th century

Solar da Beira is a public building designed in the neoclassical architectural style that integrates the Ver-o-Peso Complex. It is located in the Brazilian city of Belém, Pará, in the Cidade Velha neighborhood, on the shores of Guajará Bay. There is no record of its construction, but it is believed to have been built in the 19th century, shortly after the Ver-o-Peso Market, which dates back to 1901. At the beginning of the 20th century, it housed the Revenue Office.

In 1985, during Almir Gabriel's municipal administration, the Solar da Beira was remodeled for the first time and transformed into a restaurant and cultural space. In 1998, during the municipal administration of Edmilson Rodrigues, the facade of Solar da Beira was also renovated.

It currently houses two exhibitions, one of canvases and ceramics and the other inspired by the Círio de Nazaré.

== Reopening ==
In November 2020, Solar da Beira was reopened after undergoing a renovation that began in 2019. The work included restoring the facade, rustproofing the metal structures and hand-painting the tiles. A special cleaning was carried out on the solid bricks of the walls, which were waterproofed, and the wooden floor and roof were treated to prevent insects and fungus. Accessibility and air conditioning were also implemented.

Currently, the public can appreciate an exhibition inspired by the Círio de Nazaré on the first floor, as well as a product fair. On the upper floor, there is an exhibition of canvases and ceramic objects.

== Objects found in excavations ==
Fragments of crockery, porcelain, clay and glass bottles, some cutlery, cans, coins and even horseshoes and wheels were among the objects found during the renovations. It is estimated that these remains date from the 20th century and have been integrated into Brazil's archaeological heritage. The remodeling was monitored by a team of archaeologists, who collected around four 30-liter boxes containing artifacts discovered when the construction teams were digging to install the cistern and sewage treatment plant.

Among the most noteworthy pieces found were a metal spoon, a sardine can and a coin from the Empire period.

== Historical heritage ==
The Solar is part of the Ver-o-Peso architectural and landscape complex listed as a historical heritage site by IPHAN in 1977, which covers an area of 35,000 m^{2} and includes a series of historic buildings, including the Meat Market, Ver-o-Peso Dock, Açaí Fair, Boulevard Castilhos França, Siqueira Campos Square, Ver-o-Peso Market, and the Ver-o-Peso Fair.

== See also ==
- Feliz Lusitânia
- Palace of the Eleven Windows
- Solar Barão de Guajará
- Culture and tourism in Belém
