= Church of Our Lady of Mount Carmel (Belém) =

Catholic temple in Belém, Pará, Brazil

- Igreja de Nossa Senhora do Carmo
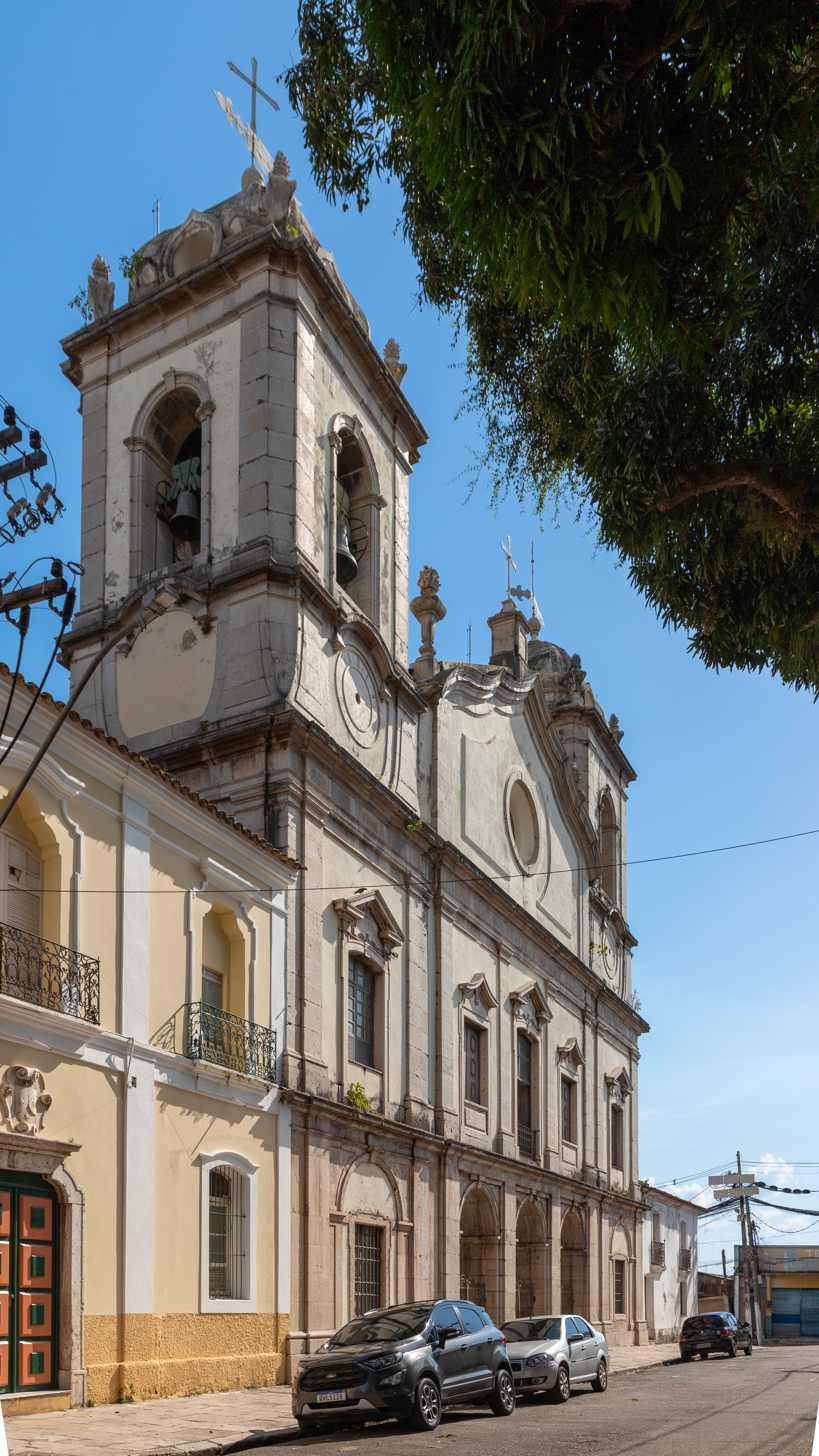
- Church of Our Lady of Mount Carmel, 2023
- Church of Our Lady of Mount Carmel
- 01°27′30″S 48°30′20″W
- Location: Belém, Pará; Brazil

Architecture
- Architect(s): Several unknown people throughout history, with the participation of Antônio Landi at one point
- Architectural type: Baroque: Portuguese national and Johannine (high altar altarpiece); Neoclassical: Pombaline style (facade)
- Completed: 1784

Administration
- Archdiocese: Archdiocese of Belém

The Church of Our Lady of Mount Carmel (Portuguese: Igreja de Nossa Senhora do Carmo) is a Catholic church located in the historic center of Belém. The current building dates back to the 18th century and was designed by several architects, including Antônio Landi. It was restored in 2015 on the initiative of the Archdiocese of Belém do Pará in partnership with Vale and the National Institute of Historical and Artistic Heritage (IPHAN). It was listed as a national heritage site by IPHAN in 1941.

== History ==
In 1626, the Order of the Discalced Carmelites came from Maranhão and settled in Pará with the purpose of catechizing natives and soldiers' children. Initially, they built a small chapel in the first place they settled and later, on May 31, 1627, they established themselves on land located on North Street, now Siqueira Mendes, in an area known as Alagadiço da Juçara. The land, which was donated by Captain Major Bento Maciel Parente, included his residence, a wattle and daub country house. They built a small chapel on the site and used the house as a convent, which was the first in the captaincy. Its first vicar was André da Natividade.

In 1690, the buildings collapsed and were demolished to make way for a new church and convent. The then governor, Antônio de Albuquerque Coelho de Carvalho, solemnly laid the foundations of the new temple. The work was interrupted on July 2, 1696, due to the bishop's ban, as an excommunicate was buried there. The Carmelites had to appeal to the Portuguese Crown Court, but only obtained a favorable decision on April 21, 1700. After the conflict, the construction work continued and was definitively completed only in 1721, under the guidance of Friar Victoriano Pimentel.

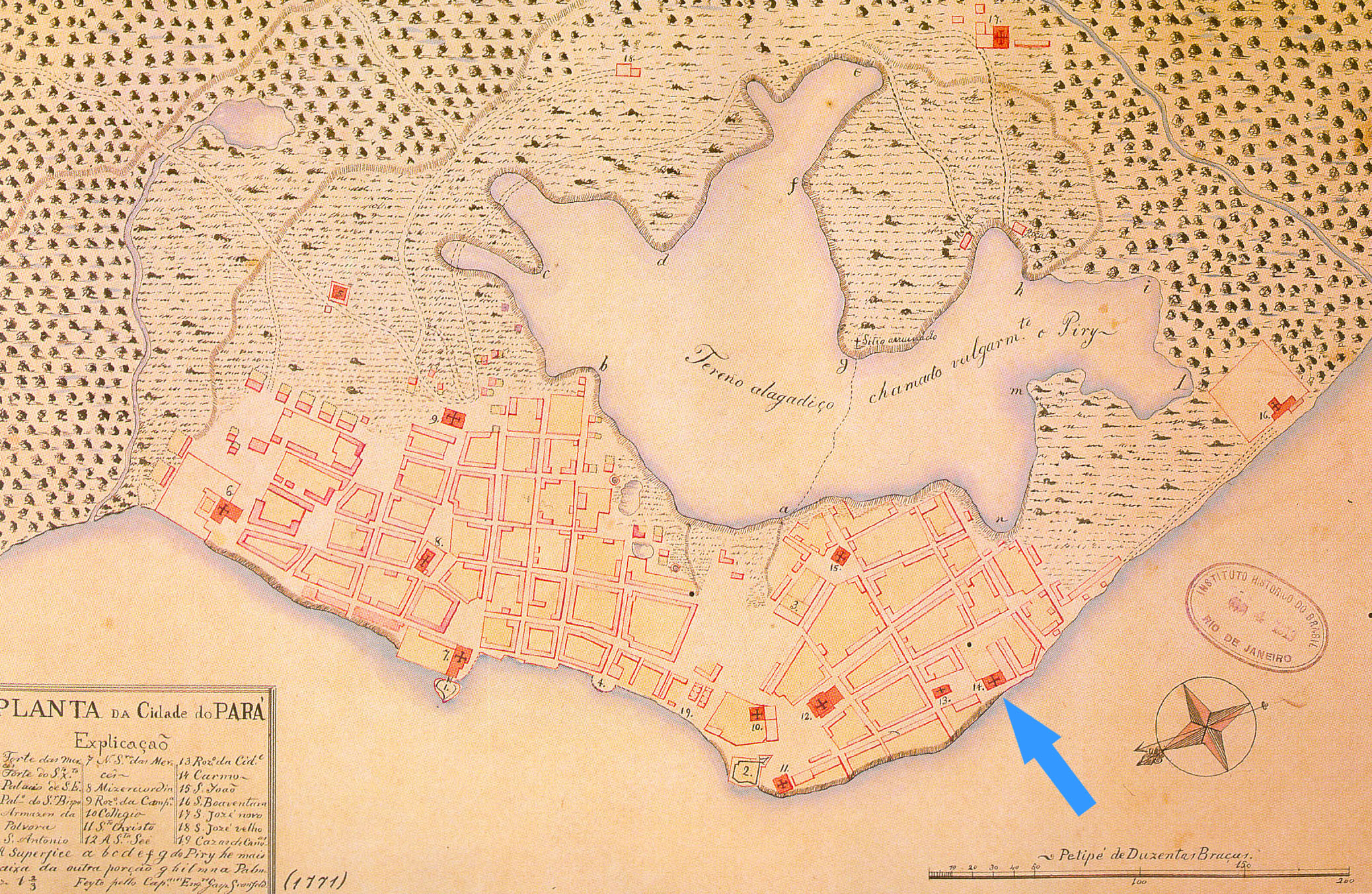
Plan of Belém from 1771, with the Church of Mount Carmel highlighted.

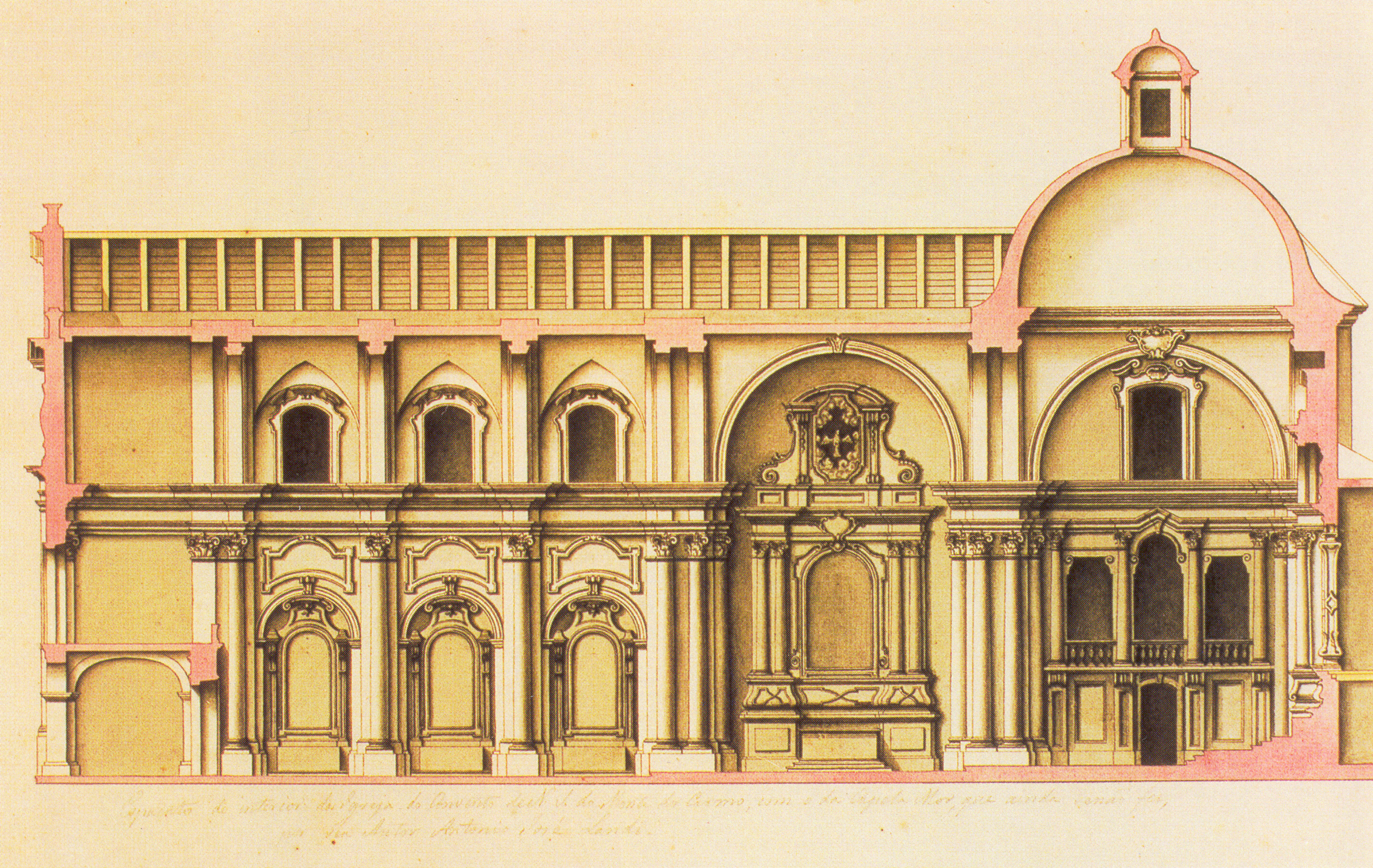
Longitudinal section of Landi's project, with the unbuilt dome roof solution replacing the previous baroque altar.

In the mid-18th century, the Carmelite priest Antônio de Azevedo left for Lisbon to commission a stone facade for the church. On July 24, 1750, master stonemasons José Pereira and Manuel Gomes were hired to carve it. The work was only completed in 1756 due to financial issues; the stone facade arrived in Belém, ready to be assembled. The facade installation work, however, caused irremediable problems to the existing building. The Italian architect Antonio Landi, who was in Belém, was called to solve the problem of the facade of the existing nave, which had to be demolished. The new structure, designed by Landi, had two naves, the main one and the transept. Only the high altar is known to have been preserved from the previous building. Some sources indicate that Landi's renovation was completed in 1766; other sources claim that the work began in that year, that the church was reopened in 1777, but that the definitive conclusion of the renovation only took place in 1784.

In the second half of the 19th century and the first half of the 20th century, the church's architecture was renovated in accordance with the style of the time. The ceiling of the central nave was painted sky blue with gold stars, and the walls and altarpieces were decorated in the scagliola method, an inheritance of a practice already carried out by Landi in the 18th century. In the 1900s, the colonial tiled floor was replaced with hydraulic tiles.

The convent, located next to the church, with a square central cloister, underwent many changes over time and housed different activities. In the 19th century, it hosted the General Council of the Province and also the first seat of the Provincial Legislative Assembly. For a time, it housed the Colégio Paraense, a traditional boarding school in the city. It also served as the Asilo de Órfãs Desvalidas, a military hospital and a minor seminary.

By 1848, the Carmelite friars in Pará had been reduced to four. In 1891, after the death of Friar Caetano de Santa Rita Serejo, the last Carmelite still living in the north of Brazil, the Order was definitively extinguished in Pará; its assets remained under the jurisdiction of the bishops. In 1930, Father Angelo Cerri, with the support of Dom Irineu Joffily, bishop of Pará, brought the Salesian Order to administer the church and occupy the convent, where they still maintain a primary and secondary school. The church is currently under the responsibility of the Seeds of the Word Community and the school building has been transformed into a Community Mission House. The house is designed to host and promote retreats, as well as holding the Sabbatical Year School.

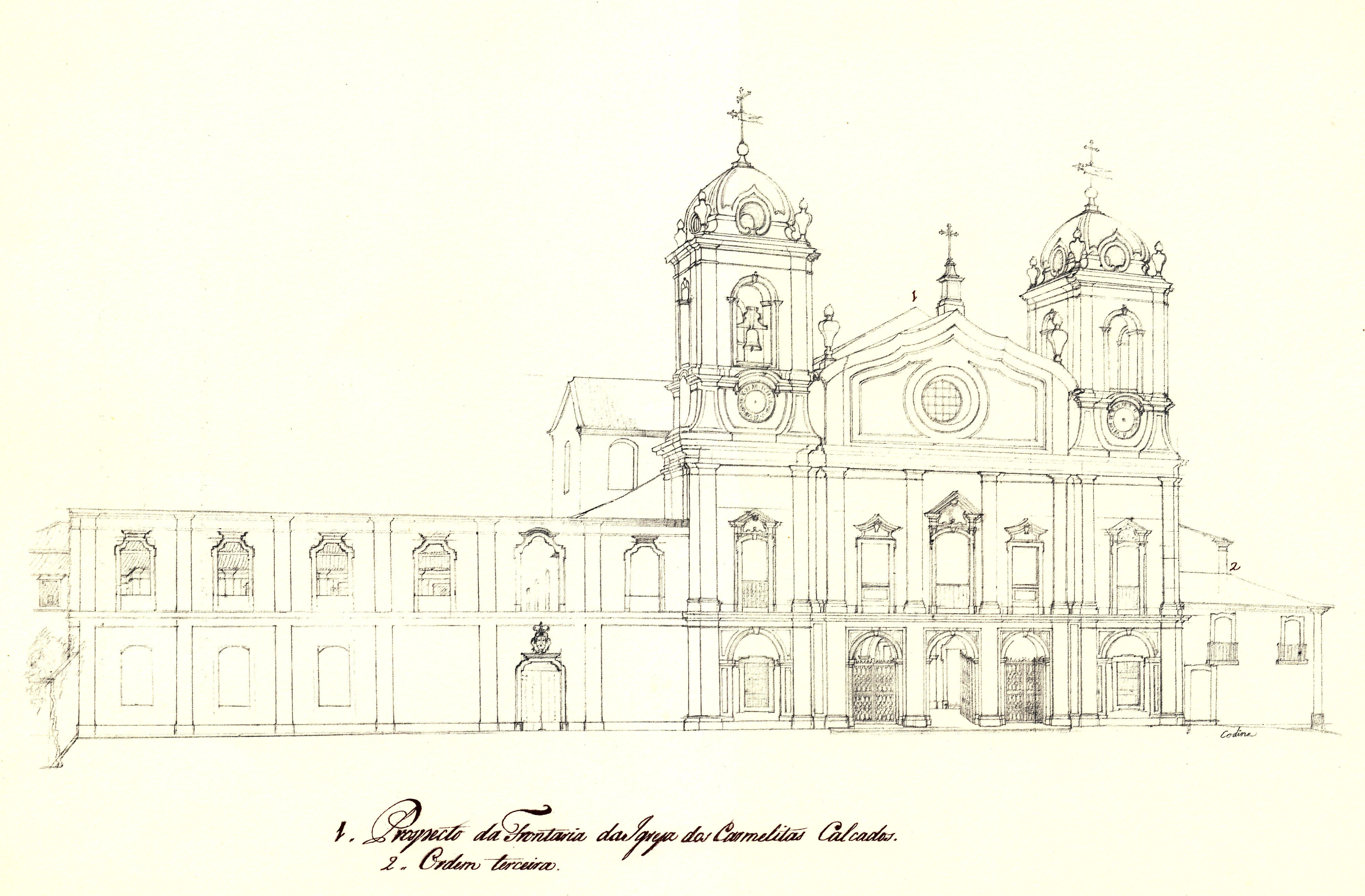
Pen drawing of the facade in 1784.

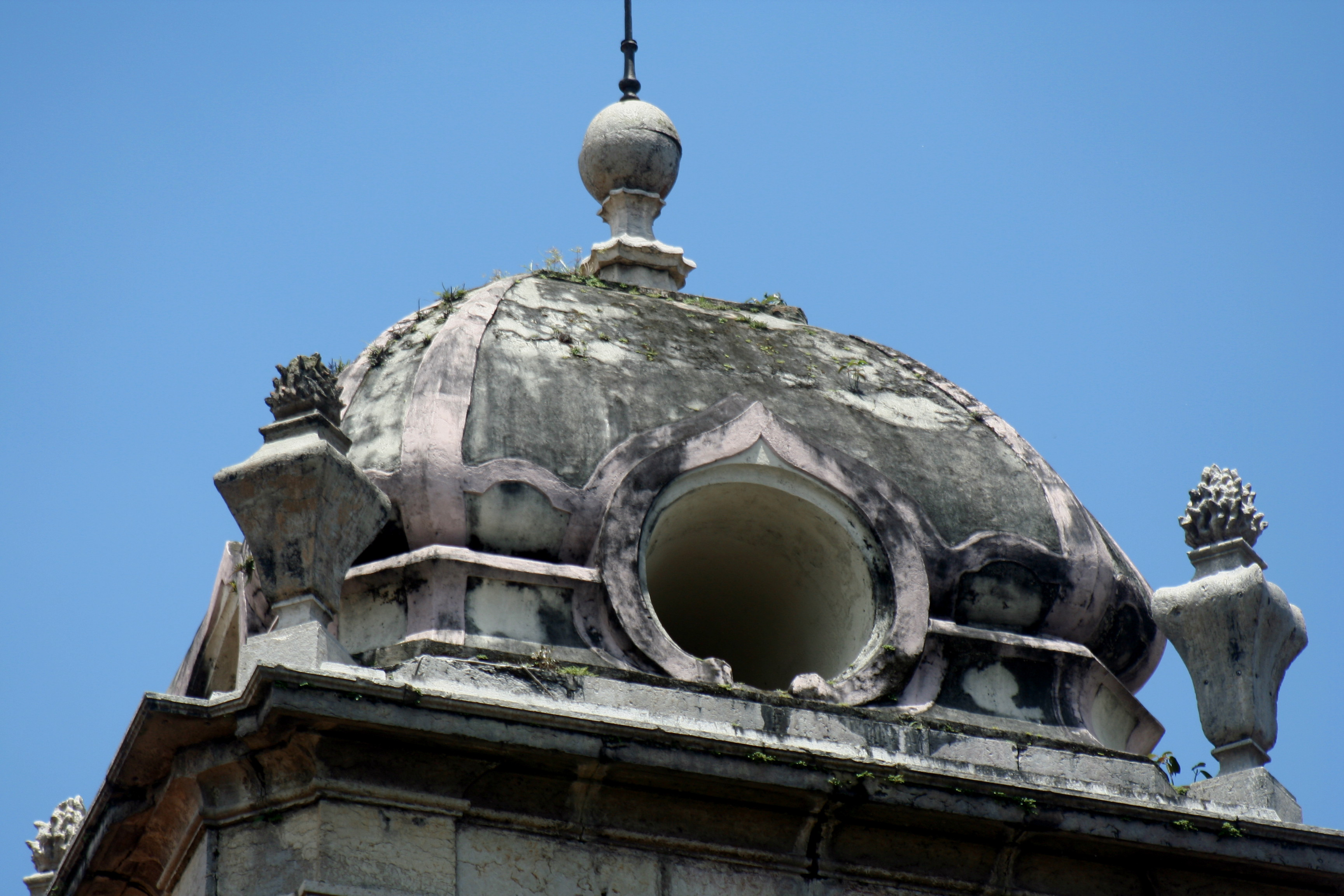
Detail of the dome of one of the towers.

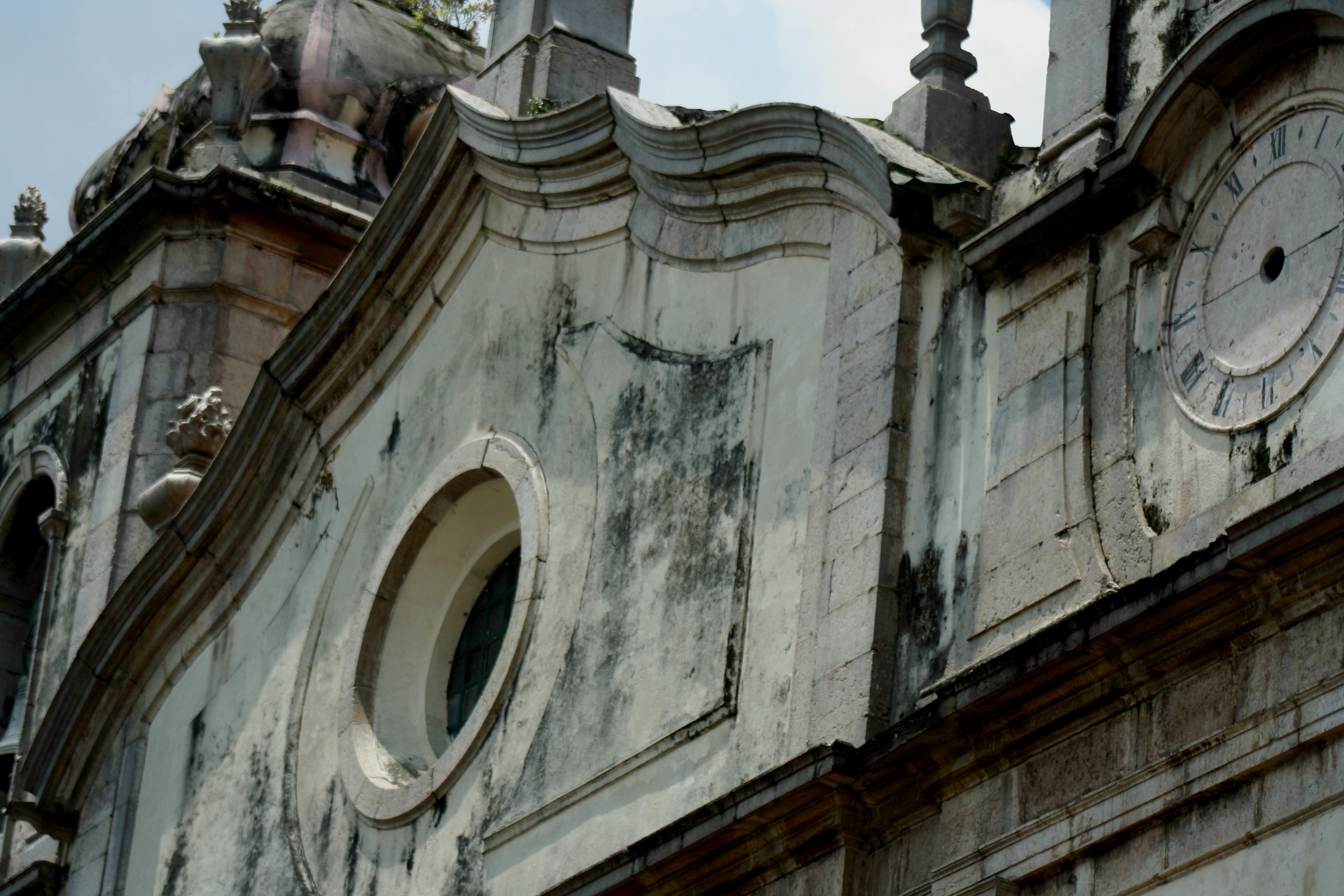
Central section pediment with oculus.

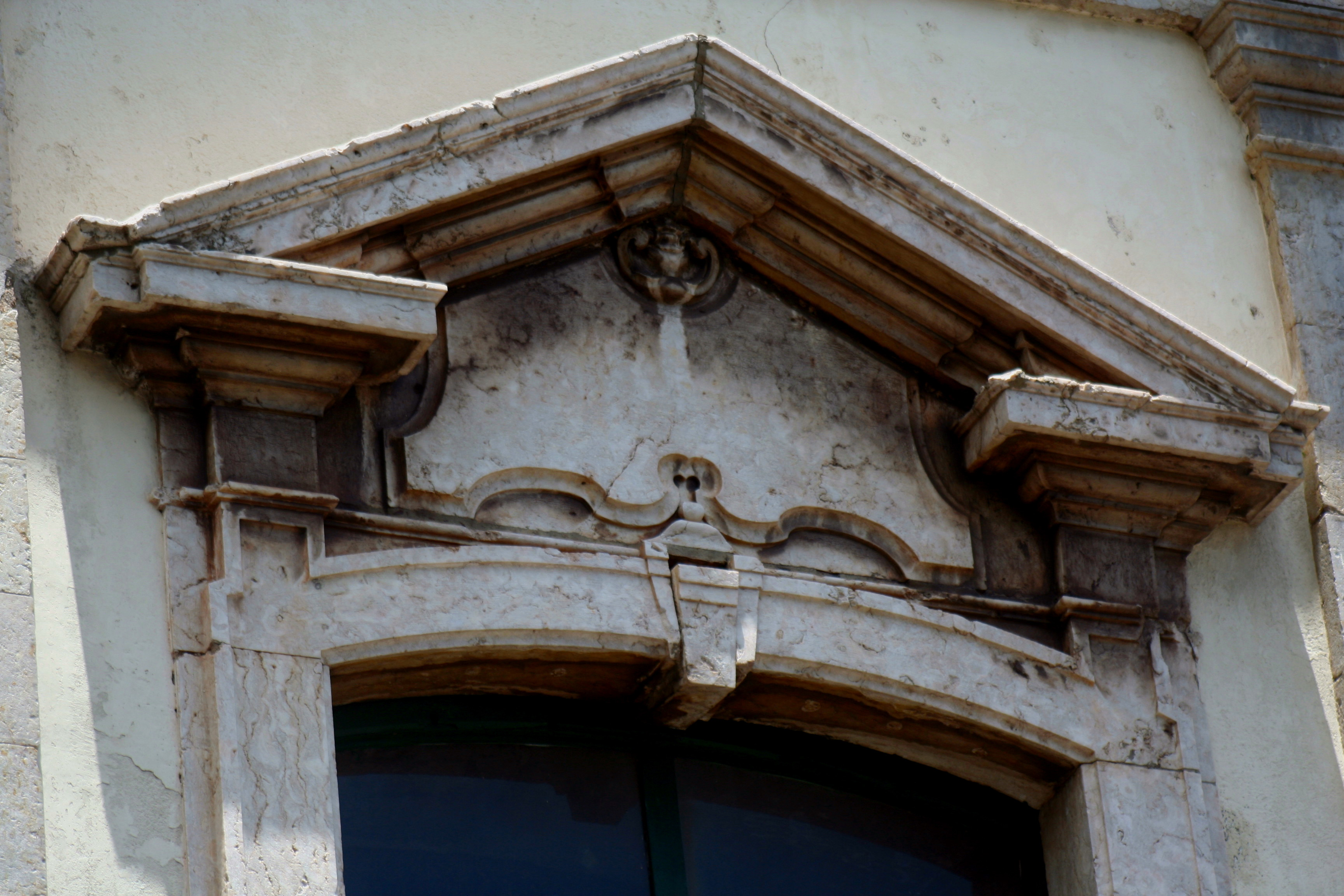
Open pediment of the central window on the upper level.

=== Restoration ===
In February 2013, restoration work began on the church. The project had been presented by IPHAN in 2012 and cost around R$4.2 million. The work was carried out through a partnership between the Archdiocese of Belém and Vale, with the support of IPHAN, and was financed by the Archdiocese's own resources and the Rouanet Law. After two years of work, the church was reopened in March 2015.

The project involved the complete restoration of the roof, elimination of numerous infiltrations, cleaning of the lioz facade, restoration of the parietal paintings, overhaul of the electrical system and installation of complementary projects that are essential for the safety of the building, such as the Fire Fighting and Atmospheric Discharge Protection Systems (SPDA), as well as the Closed Circuit TV (CCTV). The result was satisfactory, as the procedure removed much of the dirt and the aged protective film from the stones, without altering the natural appearance of the material.

== Architecture ==
=== Facade ===
Schematic floor plan of the church. (Green - Church; Yellow - Adoration chapel; Pink - Chapel of the Third Order; Purple - Annex; Grey - Carmel College)

Carved from lioz by master stonemasons José Pereira and Manuel Gomes between 1750 and 1756, the facade was produced in Portugal and transported to be assembled in Belém, becoming the only stone facade in the city. It displays a Pombaline style with a sober design characteristic of this period.

The facade, marked by Tuscan pilasters, has a central structure divided into two floors and three panels, topped by a mixed pediment with pinnacles in the shape of vases with fireplaces. Above the pediment is an iron cross; its tympanum is pierced by an oculus. The central structure is framed by side towers with domes pierced by oculi and a slightly bulbous shape.

On the ground level of the facade, three of the five round arches give access to the narthex through doors. On the faces of the towers, the arches are blind, although there are windows below them. The upper level is lined with five windows corresponding to the arches below, the central one being a door-window. The windows are framed by two different symmetrically distributed Pombaline models, interspersed by the pilasters. Some authors classify these small pediments as having traces of Francesco Borromini.

Some of its architectural elements, which were already common in Lisbon, were introduced in Belém through this facade, such as the undulating pediment and the domes topped by glasses. According to Mendonça, its typology, divided by a narthex and framed by side towers, was common to the churches of Carmelite and Franciscan convents, a strong tradition in Portugal and Brazil.

=== Atrium ===
In the church's atrium, important personalities from the history of Pará are buried, such as Captain General Pedro Albuquerque, Governor Francisco Coelho de Carvalho, Ombudsman General Mateus Dias da Costa and Cabanagem leader Félix Clemente Malcher.

=== Altarpiece ===
The altarpiece of the high altar is classified as a transitional model from the Portuguese national period to the Joanine period, where the gilded woodwork is made by local artisans, with phytomorphic elements, predominantly acanthus leaves, and zoomorphic elements, with allegorical birds. In front of the altarpiece, there is a wooden altar covered in Portuguese silver, full of symbolic decorative elements alluding to the Virgin Mary.

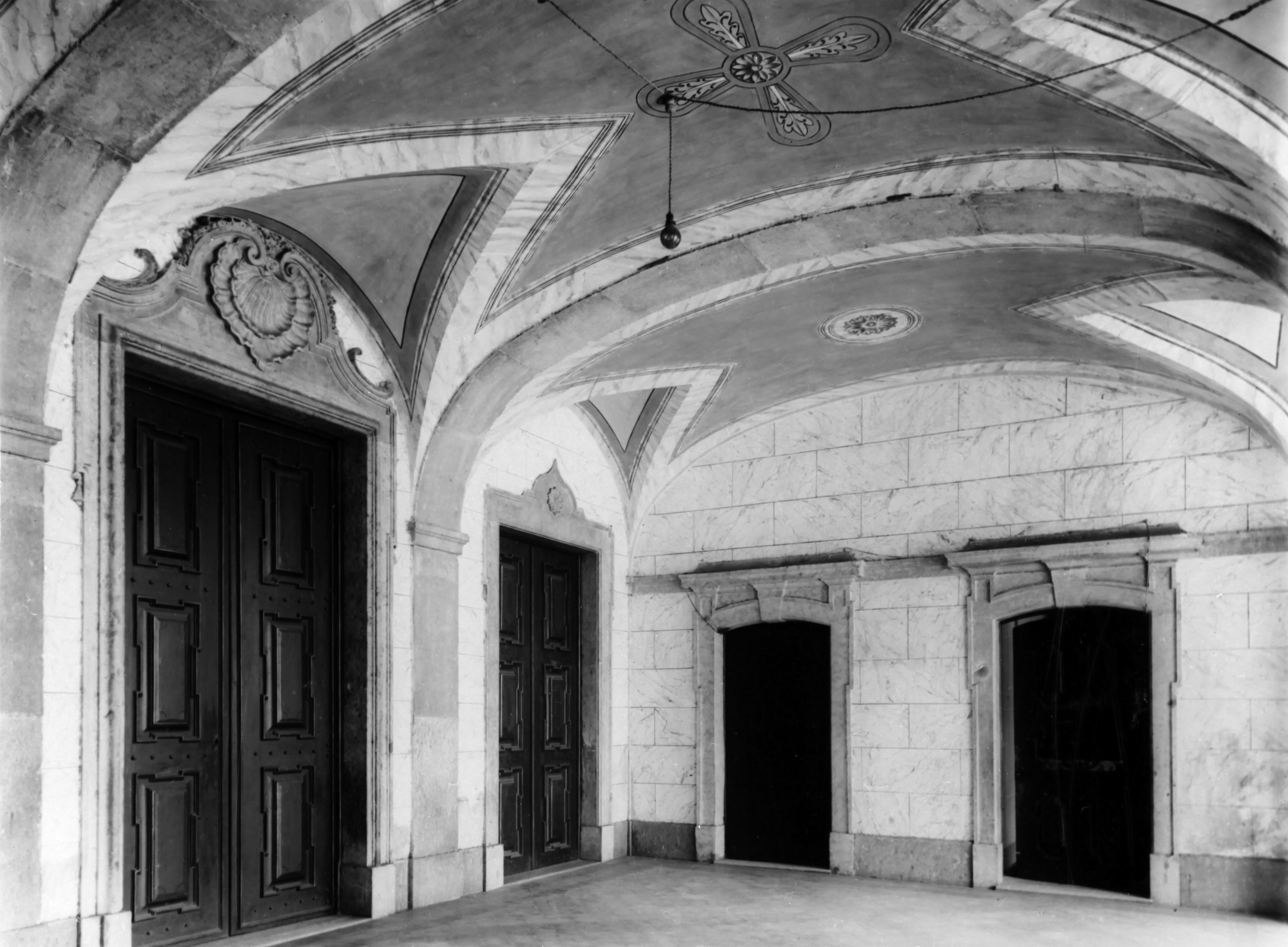
Narthex, in a photo from 1940.

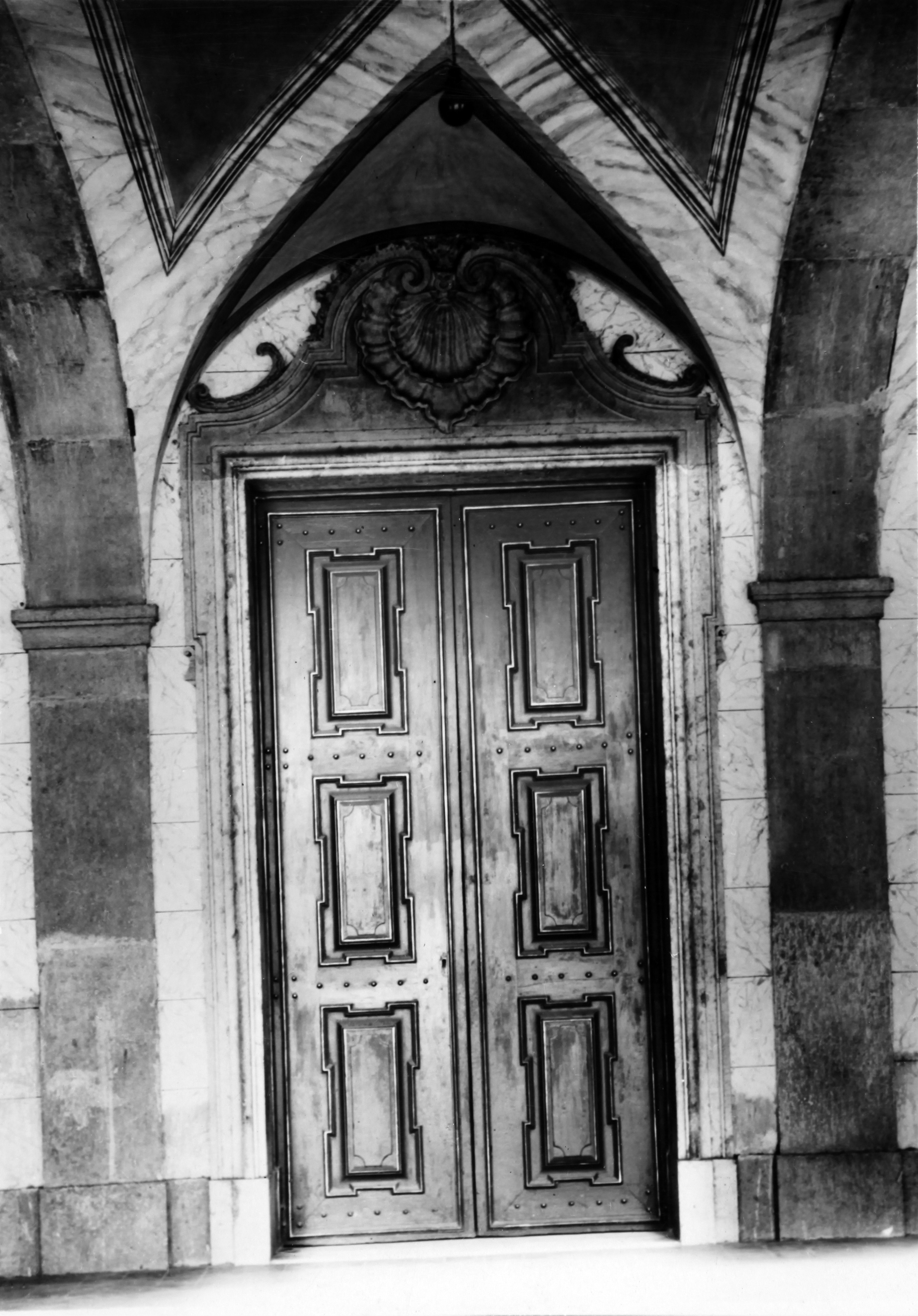
Central door leading to the nave.

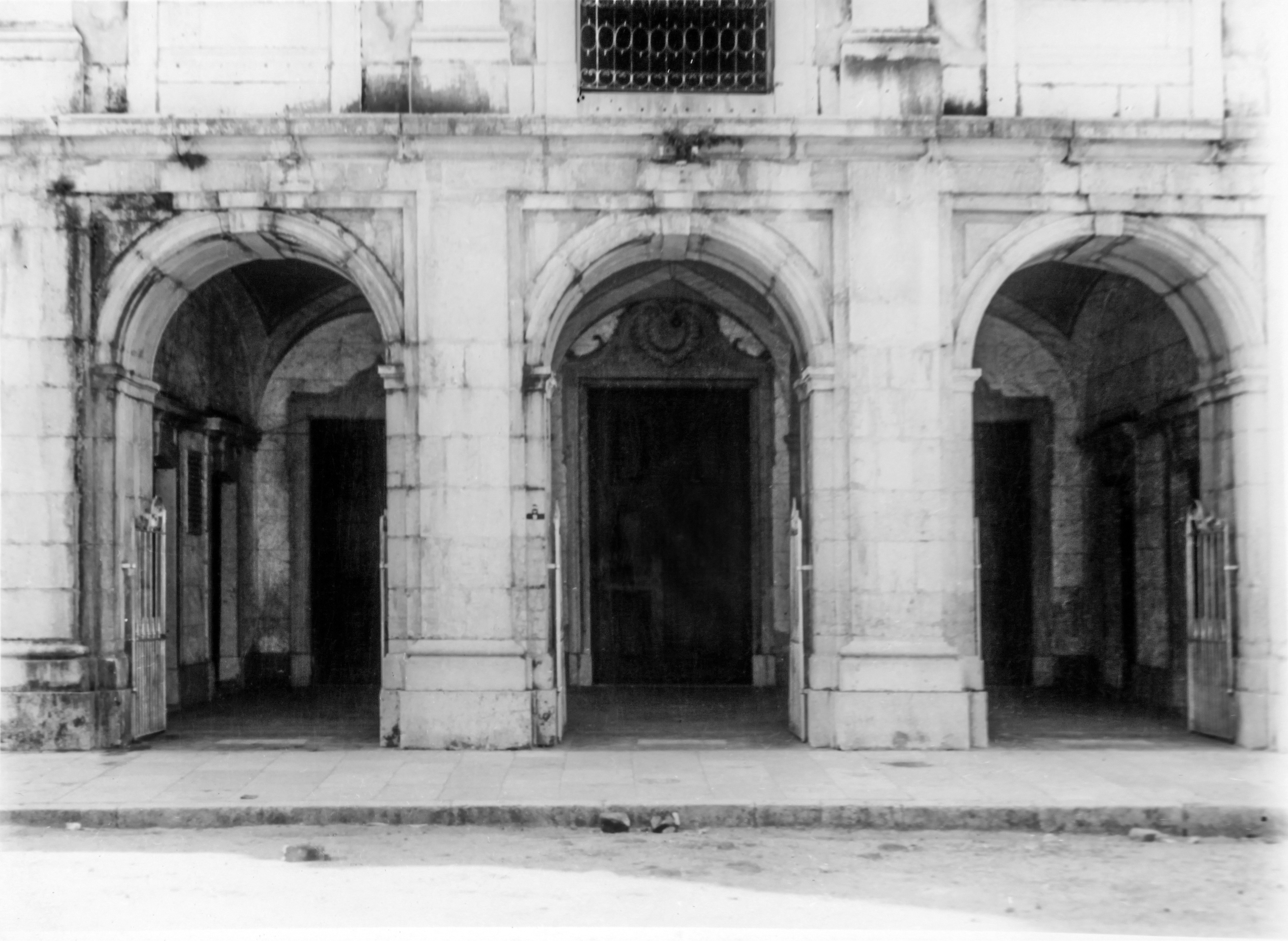
Narthex seen from the outside.

== See also ==
- Culture and tourism in Belém
- Basilica of Our Lady of Nazareth of Exile
- Our Lady of Grace Cathedral
