= History of Belém =

City in Northern Brazil

The History of Belém refers to the history of this Brazilian municipality in the Northern Region of the country, the capital of the state of Pará, which had its origins in the 17th century in the indigenous region of Mairi, located 160 km from the equator.

== Overview ==
Until the beginning of the sixteenth century, Portugal showed no interest in the lands located at the mouth of the Amazon River; a fact possibly linked to the policies adopted by the royal courts of the first expansionist phase, more concerned with expanding their domains along the African coast and the East. However, the succession crisis that led to the union of the courts of Portugal and Spain, coupled with the threat of pirates and smugglers in the region near the equator, implied a change of attitude beyond the Treaty of Tordesillas. This accelerated a response in military terms materialized in expeditions for the expulsion of the invaders and the establishment of settlements along the borders. One of these was the expedition commanded by Francisco Caldeira Castelo Branco (1566-1619) toward the mouth of the Amazon River.

The construction of a city in the middle of the Amazon rainforest was difficult regarding the change in the natural environment; colonizers faced flooded lands, intersected by streams, intense vegetation, and periods of heavy rain.

Belém had economic and political strengths, such as in 1621, when the colonial settlement was elevated to the category of the municipality with the denomination of "Santa Maria de Belém do Pará" or "Nossa Senhora de Belém do Grão Pará". In 1625, the fiscal warehouse "Casa de Haver o Peso" was created and in 1654, due to the importance of the warehouse the "State of Maranhão" was renamed as "State of Maranhão and Grão-Pará". In 1751, Belém reached its first commercial peak and became the first capital of the Brazilian Amazon.

== History ==
=== Etymology ===
The toponym "belém" originates from the Hebrew "בית לחם" ("Beit Lehem"), literally meaning "House of Bread".

In 1621, the initial Portuguese colonial settlement "Feliz Lusitânia" (now Belém) was elevated to the category of the municipality with the name "Santa Maria de Belém do Pará" or "Nossa Senhora de Belém do Grão Pará" (an homage to Mary mother of Jesus) - being called by the abbreviation "Belém do Pará" by King Philip III of Spain (1578-1621). The name can also be considered an homage to the western day of Christmas (December 25); the day when Captain Francisco Caldeira Castelo Branco (1566 - 1619, former Captain-Mor of Rio Grande do Norte) left in 1615 from the city of São Luís to secure the dominion of the eastern Amazon and the riches of the Conquista do Pará.

== European beginnings and colonization ==
The region where Belém do Pará is located was initially the busy indigenous region of Mairi, home of the Tupinambá and Pacajás (under the command of cacique Guaimiaba). In 1580, the Portuguese invaded the area through the military expedition Feliz Lusitânia commanded by Captain Castelo Branco (at the behest of the king of the Iberian Union and Philippine dynasty, Manoel I), and established a colonial nucleus aiming to dominate the Amazon River, occupy the Conquista do Pará, or Empire of the Amazonas (located in the then Captaincy of Maranhão), and assure the dominance in Eastern Amazon and of the drogas do sertão (how spices from the region were called), which the foreigners disputed.

Thus, on January 12, 1616, the colonial settlement Feliz Lusitânia was founded at the mouth of the Piry Creek and the Amazon River, in a strategic position near the entrepôt of the Marajoara, with a fortress then called Forte do Presépio (today Forte do Castelo) containing the chapel of the patron saint Nossa Senhora de Belém (today the Nossa Senhora de Belém Cathedral). This colonial settlement was considered an island, as it was surrounded by the Piry igarapé and its tributaries, having been landfilled in 1803.

In the early years of the Conquista do Pará, there was a need for missionaries due to the existence of many peoples ("gentios"). Thus, in July 1617, the Capuchin friars of Santo Antonio: Cristóvão de São José, Sebastião do Rosário, Felipe de S. Boaventura and, Antônio de Marciana, founded in a remote part of the city the Convent of Una.

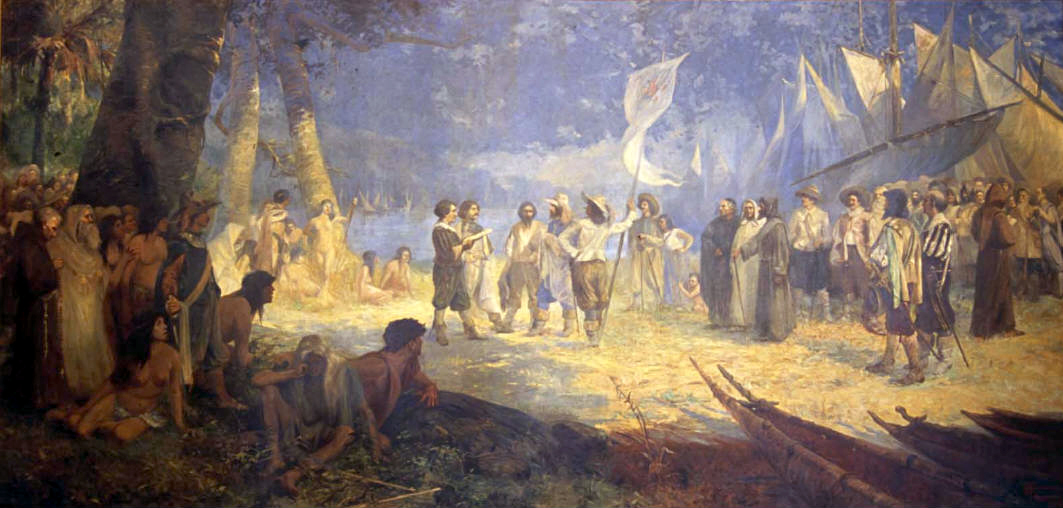
A conquista do Amazonas ("The conquest of the Amazon"), by Antônio Parreiras, Pará Historical Museum.

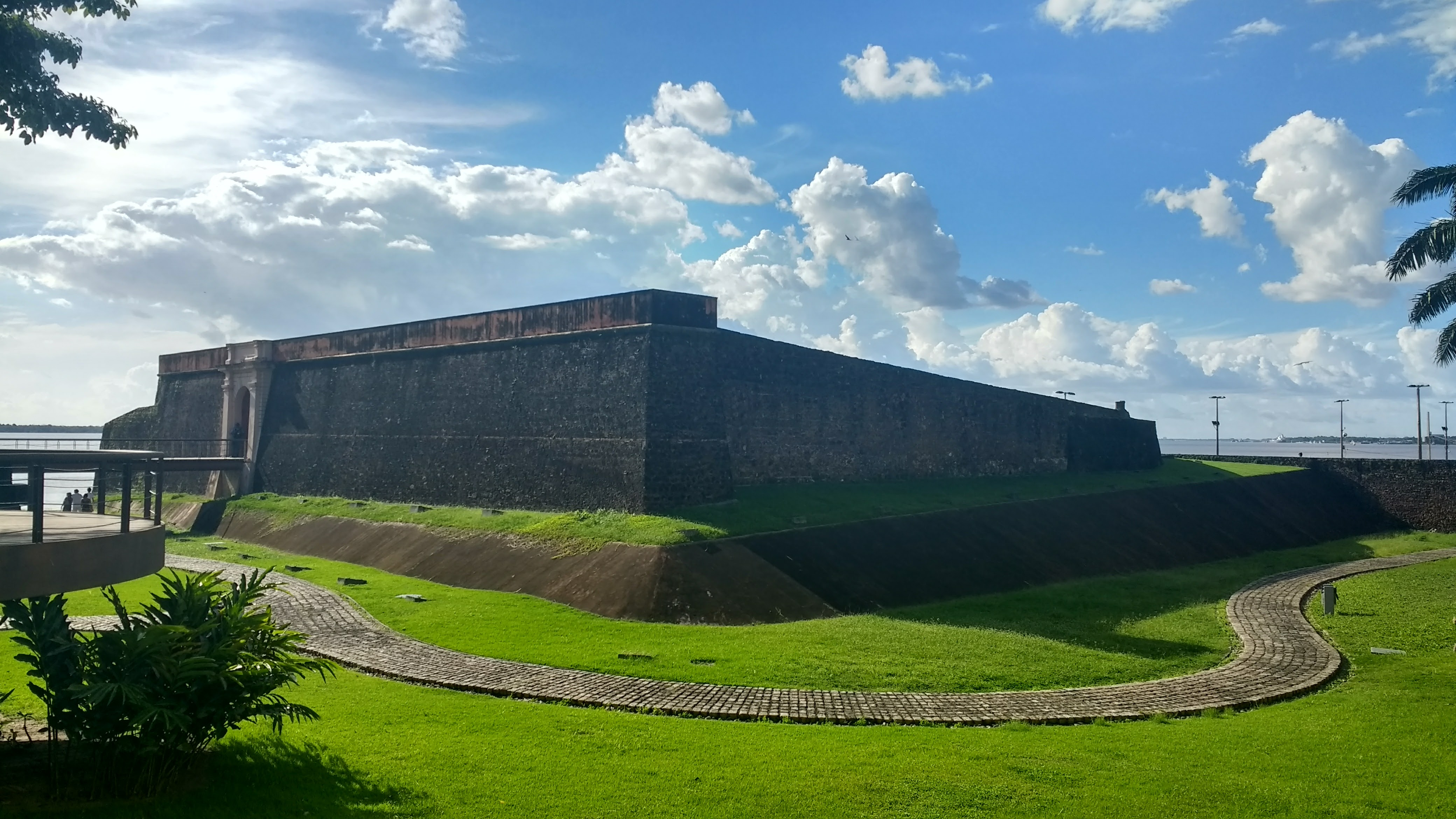
Presépio Fort, built in 1616.

A period of battles against foreigners (Dutch, English, French) occurred to secure dominance in the eastern Amazon and against indigenous tribes in the colonization/slavery process to implement an economic model based on the exploitation of indigenous labor and local primary resources. This resulted in the Tupinambás Uprising, in which in January 1619, Tupinambá attack forces took the Castelo Fort. Gaspar Cardoso changed the course of the war by killing the Morubixaba warrior Guamiaba Tupinambá causing a suspension of the attack to hold the funeral.

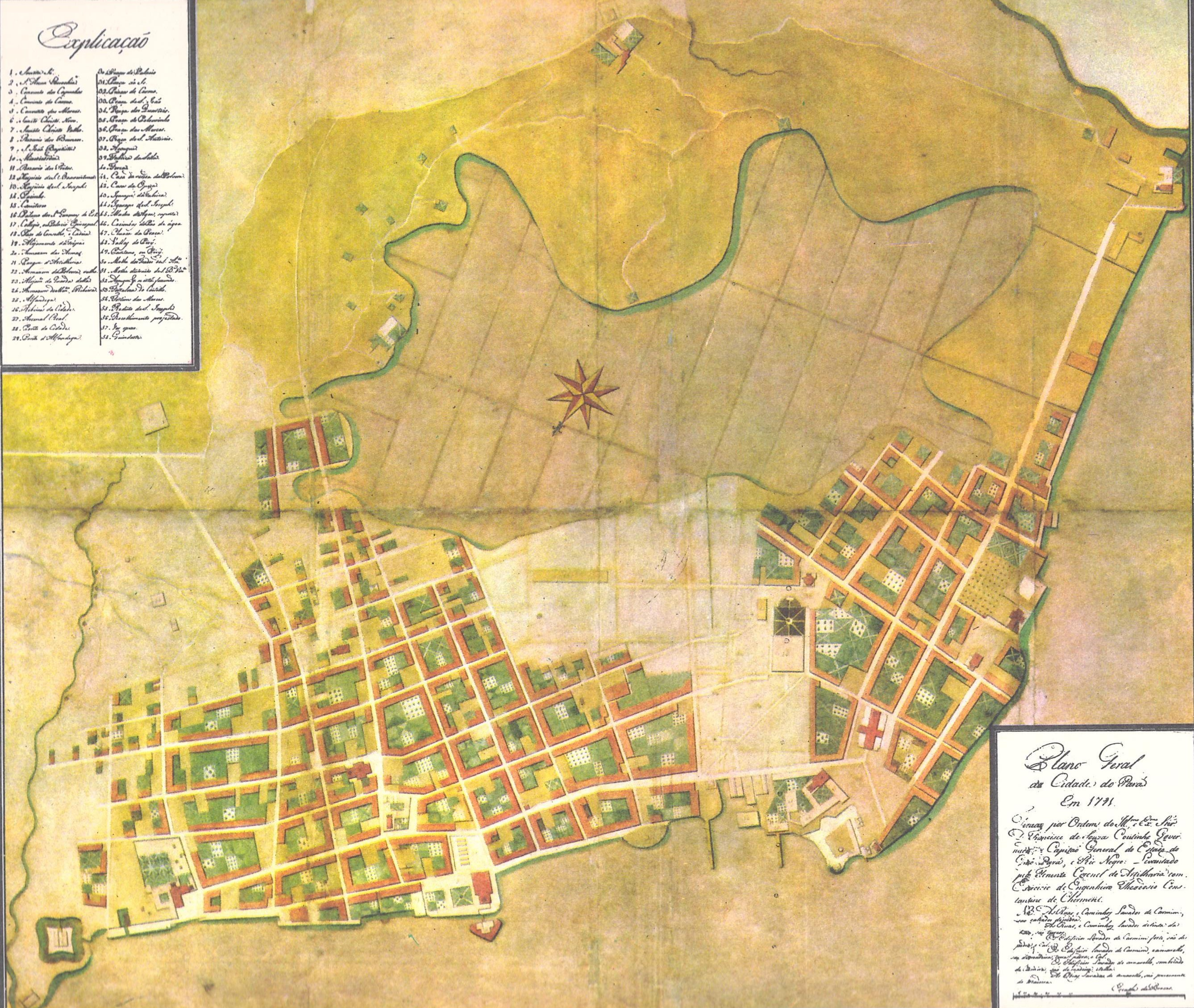
General plan of the city of Belém, 1791, according to Alexandre Rodrigues Ferreira.

Other Indian revolts occurred until July 1621, when in 1639, Bento Maciel Parente, sergeant major of the Captaincy of Cabo Norte, invested in the village of the Tapajós Indians, decimating them and dominating the Conquista do Pará. With the victory securing possession of the territory, King Philip II created the State of Maranhão (with headquarters in São Luís, encompassing the captaincies of Maranhão and Ceará), and transformed the Conquista do Pará into the Captaincy of Grão-Pará, with Bento Maciel appointed as Captain-Major of this new Captaincy. The village of Feliz Lusitânia was elevated to the category of municipality with the denomination of "Santa Maria de Belém do Pará" or "Nossa Senhora de Belém do Grão Pará" (current Belém), when in 1650 the first streets of the region were built, originating the historical and first neighborhood called Cidade (current Cidade Velha) where the settlers raised their wattle and daub houses.

During his government, Bento Maciel Parente fortified the Presépio Fort, placing an artillery bastion with four pieces, a keep, and a lodge, renaming it "Castelo do Senhor Santo Cristo Fort ". Later on, he ordered other attacks against the Dutch invaders, expelling them from the colony.

In 1625, due to its strategic position at the mouth of the Amazon River, the Portuguese installed a fiscal warehouse called "Casa de Haver o Peso" (now the Ver-o-Peso market), to collect taxes on European products brought to Belém, and on those extracted from the Amazon destined for international markets, such as spices and beef from Marajó Island. In 1627, the importance of the Haver-o-Peso warehouse increased with the creation of the first patrimonial league by orders of Governor Francisco Coelho, a portion of land donated via a letter of sesmaria (Note: Portuguese system, adapted in Brazil, which regulated the distribution of land for agricultural production.) to the City Council of Belém to boost the growth of the municipality. As a result, in 1654 the State of Maranhão was renamed "Estado do Maranhão e Grão-Pará", with the headquarters transferred to Belém, making it the first capital of Amazon (in 1772, this state was divided into the autonomous colony "Estado do Grão-Pará e Rio Negro").

Around 1676, 50 families of Azorean settlers arrived in the city (a total of 234 people), and it was necessary to open a street to house the new inhabitants, called Rua São Vicente, originating the second neighborhood called Campina. From that moment the city began to show a population increase and the neighborhood began to distance itself from the coast. At that time, the Barra Fortress and São Pedro Nolasco Fort were built.

During the Viagem Filosófica expedition, the naturalist and explorer Alexandre Rodrigues Ferreira criticized the urbanization policy implemented by military engineers in Grão-Pará and the urbanization of Belém with the obstacle of swamps (especially the Piry Lake), considering unhealthy the establishment of settlements in swampy regions near rivers and forest regions with humid climate: prone to major floods, air contamination due to decomposition of organic matter, and proliferation of diseases. The pombaline administration found a problem in the urbanization policies, which considered only the geostrategic position in the foundation projects of the settlements, disregarding the sanitary conditions.

Ferreira, based on the philosophy of urbanization as a form of political control (associated with the birth of social medicine and medical architecture), proposed measures to enable the urban occupation of riverbanks, such as large works of water catchment and distribution, construction of wide streets aiming at the wide circulation of air, drainage of stagnant water in flooded areas of the city, construction of navigation and irrigation canals. Whereas this conception does not destroy the fortified-city urbanization model used in the Portuguese colonization process, water management occupied a prominent place in the urban policy of the eighteenth century, associated with studies of climate and water dynamics for the land occupation. The technical mastery of water was inscribed, in the Age of Enlightenment, in the valorization of agriculture, in the exploitation of natural resources, and in the circulation of goods with the development of the navy.

In the second half of the 18th century, there were urban reforms following the medical architecture that sought the health of the population, after many deaths due to epidemics in the first half of the century, such as measles that ravaged the city in 1749 and killed over 15 thousand people in the state. These were associated with the humid climate and flooding, such as the diseases malaria, smallpox, intermittent fevers, and bronchitis. The governor of the state of Pará implemented quarantines for the treatment of slaves arriving on the ships with smallpox, scurvy, and scabies, who were sent to the São José Hospice (1749), established in a location away from the city. Hospitals were also built in Belém, such as the Hospital da Caridade, with funds received from public donations, to serve the poor in the epidemic.

In 1772, the "State of Grão Pará and Maranhão" was divided into the "State of Maranhão and Piauí" and the "State of Grão-Pará and Rio Negro", with headquarters in Belém, which remained autonomous Portuguese colonies until 1823.

The health-oriented architecture transformed the spaces established in the projects for the water supply. Many buildings in the city had wells, such as the convent of Santo Antônio of the Jesuits and the governor's palace. In 1783, the "Casa da mãe d'água" was built to supply water to the Governor's Palace and part of the city. The obstacles of nature were overcome through reason and art, expressing the domination of nature by man, following the principle of enlightenment.

=== 19th century ===
In 1822, with the independence of Brazil (a process of political rupture), the captaincies were transformed into provinces. But the Captaincy of Grão-Pará faced a time of indecision, in which it would either become independent, join the central government of Brazil, or continue to be linked to Portugal. This happened due to some aspects such as: The local elite (bourgeoisie and landowners) being strongly linked to the Metropolis (who commanded the exports of the exploited products), the influence of the Liberal Revolution of 1820 which provoked contradictory reactions in the province, the region being distant from the decision making centers of the Southeast region and the central government. The result was that integration with the Kingdom of Brazil was not accepted.

Initially, the Portuguese and Brazilians united with the cortes' decision to create a constitutional monarchy, but when the Portuguese got rid of French rule with the Liberal Revolution, they demanded the recolonization of the Empire of Brazil, attempting to annul the decisions of João VI, such as the elevation to a kingdom. This generated another revolt of Brazilians against recolonization on one side, and the Portuguese in favor of the cortes' decision on the other.

One year after independence, Pedro I pressured the province to join Brazil, which occurred in a dramatic process. He sent a ship to Belém commanded by John Pascoe Grenfell, with the mission to incorporate Pará at any cost. Grenfell threatened to do so, stating that there was a large military fleet arriving in Belém, a naval blockade that would bombard the capital, and that any resistance by the Portuguese would be in vain. Afraid of the threat, the Portuguese did not react, and the province of Grão-Pará (covering the current states of Pará, Amazonas, Amapá, Roraima, and Rondônia) was incorporated into the Empire of Brazil on the 15th of that month.

However, it was realized that the threat was a lie, and it was revealed that the "military squadron" would never reach Belém. The Portuguese then restarted the persecution of the rebels who were sympathetic to independence, but the Brazilian rebels retaliated with more violence. On 1823,a group of pro-independence military officers, alongside some civilians, initiated that brief rebellion in Belém that was soon quashed.

After the first Independent Pará Governor Council was elected (August 17), a violent popular reaction erupted, led by Canon Batista Campos, with a demonstration demanding equal rights to those of the Portuguese living in Pará. This forced Grenfell to land troops and make mass arrests to restore public order. He called the population to a meeting in front of the government palace and chose five soldiers to be executed. On August 19, since there were not enough prisoners on land, Grenfell authorized the arrest in the holds of the brigadier "Saint Joseph the Diligent", of two hundred and fifty-seven prisoners, where almost all of them (except one) died of asphyxiation in the tragedy. Thus, Grenfell appeased the conflicts in the province.

Despite the pressure for the acceptance of the adhesion of Pará, the population had the expectation that the independence would represent radical changes in the economic and socio-political structure of the region. But as Grão-Pará recognized independence late (on August 15, 1823), Pedro I ignored the province. The accession to independence, maintained the same group that was already in power, consisting mostly of Portuguese; besides slavery still remaining strong; poverty and disease also increasing. These facts generated a popular discontent called the Cabanagem, influenced by the French Revolution.

==== Cabanagem ====
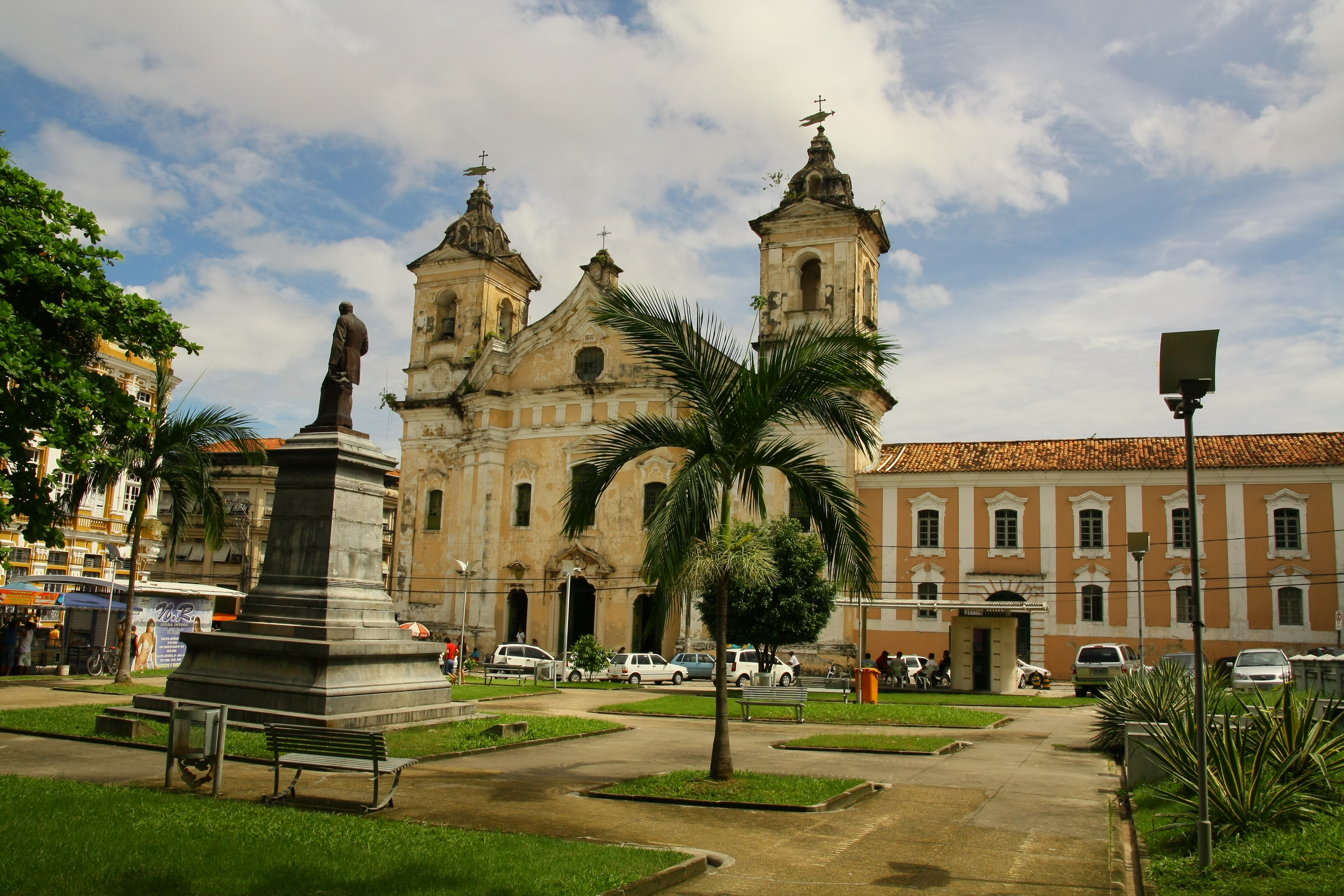
Church of Nossa Senhora das Mercês, built in the 18th century, relevant in the context of Cabanagem, in the battle of the "War Train".

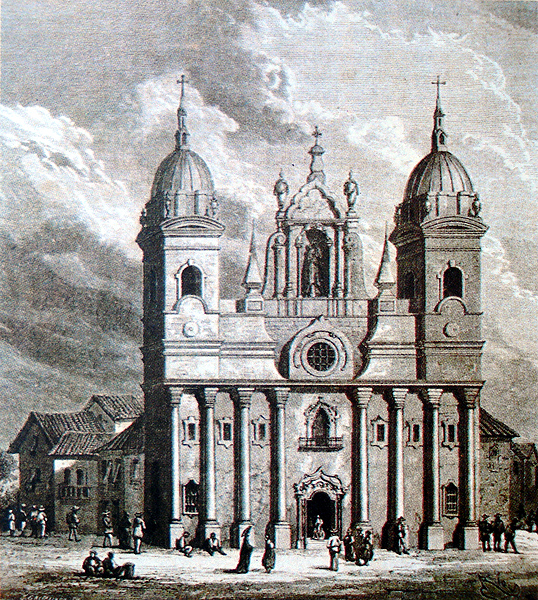
Belém's cathedral in the 19th century.

The Guerra dos Cabanos (also known as Cabanagem or Cabanage Revolt) was a popular and social revolt that took place during the Brazilian regency period, influenced by the French Revolution, in the then Province of Grão-Pará in the period from 1835 to 1840. It happened due to the extreme poverty and diseases in Pará, which marked the beginning of this period; the late recognition of Brazil's independence (1822), and the despising of the region by prince regent Pedro I, strengthening the link with Portugal. The Indians and mestizos, the majority and members of the middle class, united against the regency government in this revolt, to increase the importance of Pará in the central Brazilian government and face the issue of poverty of the people of the region.

In 1835, the Cabanos, commanded by Antônio Vinagre, invaded the government palace in Belém and executed the then-president of the province, Bernardo Lobo de Sousa, along with other authorities.

With the overthrowing of the local government, the Cabanos started their first government, putting the power in the hands of the military Clemente Malcher. The new government betrayed the movement by showing its loyalty to the Portuguese government (Emperor), even repressing the revolt that brought it to power. In revolt, the Cabanos killed Malcher and put in power Francisco Vinagre. Repeating what happened in the first Cabano government, the new leader also betrayed the movement. Willing to negotiate with the central government, Vinagre showed an interest in ceding his power to someone appointed by the Portuguese. Dissatisfied, Vinagre was deposed giving way to the third Cabano president, Eduardo Angelim, but ended up weakened as support from local elites diminished.

In 1836, the central government of Pará, commanded by Brigadier Francisco José de Sousa Soares de Andréa (subordinate to the Empire), bombarded the Cabanos hideouts and arrested Eduardo Angelim. The Cabanos then hid in the forests of Belém, to try again to seize power through guerrilla tactics. After five years of fighting, the regency government managed to repress the revolt in the capital, due to the political weakness of the movement and the absence of an experienced leader.

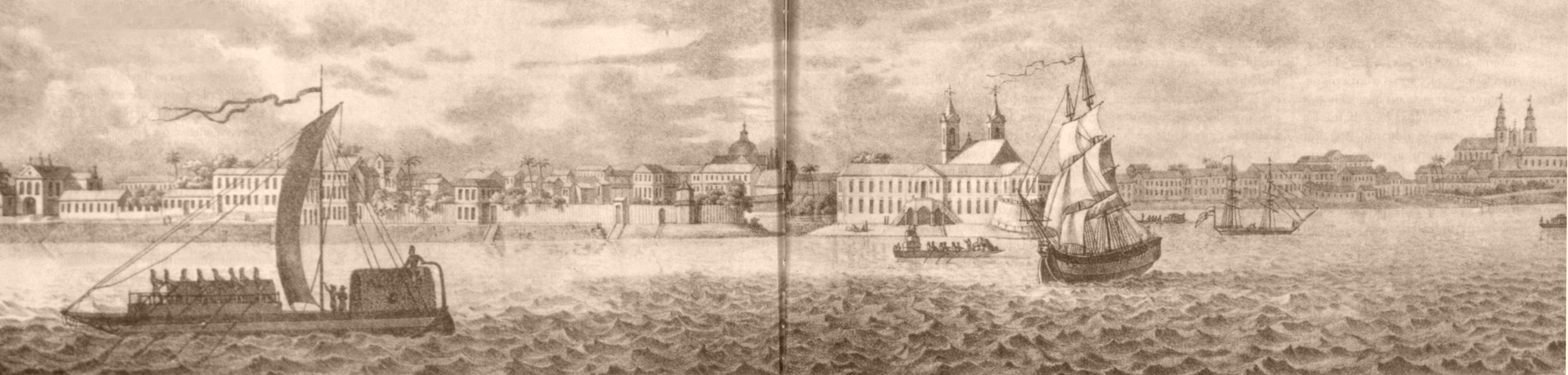
Belém in 1825, by Johann Baptist von Spix & Carl Friedrich Philipp von Martius.

==== Rubber cycle ====
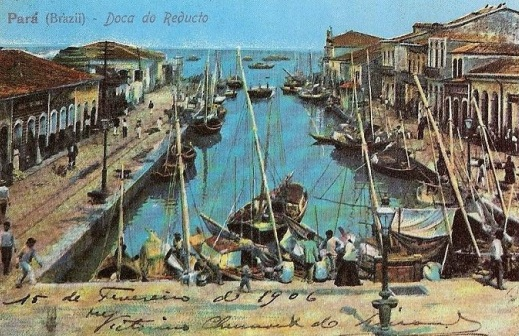
Belém in the 19th Century

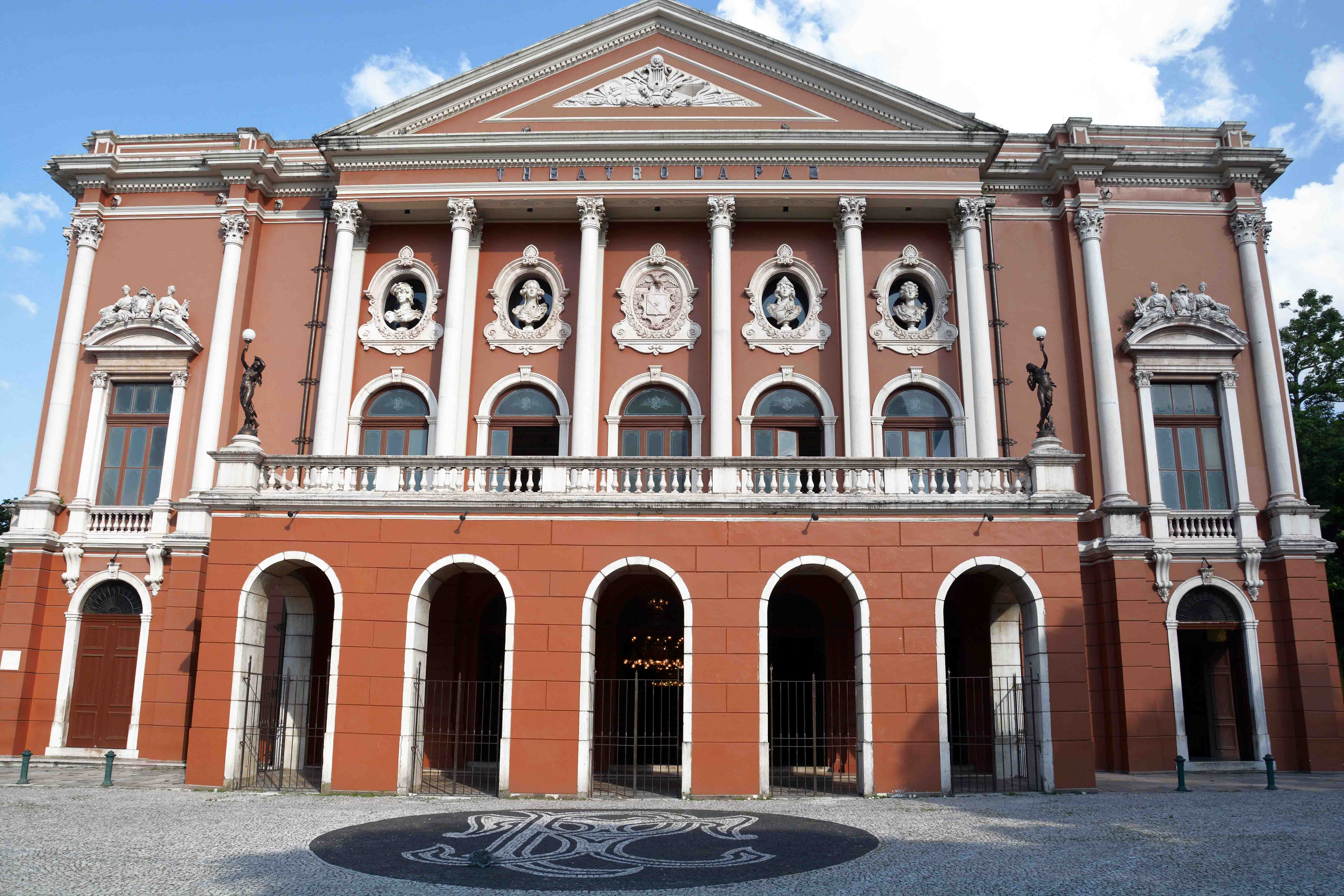
Theatro da Paz

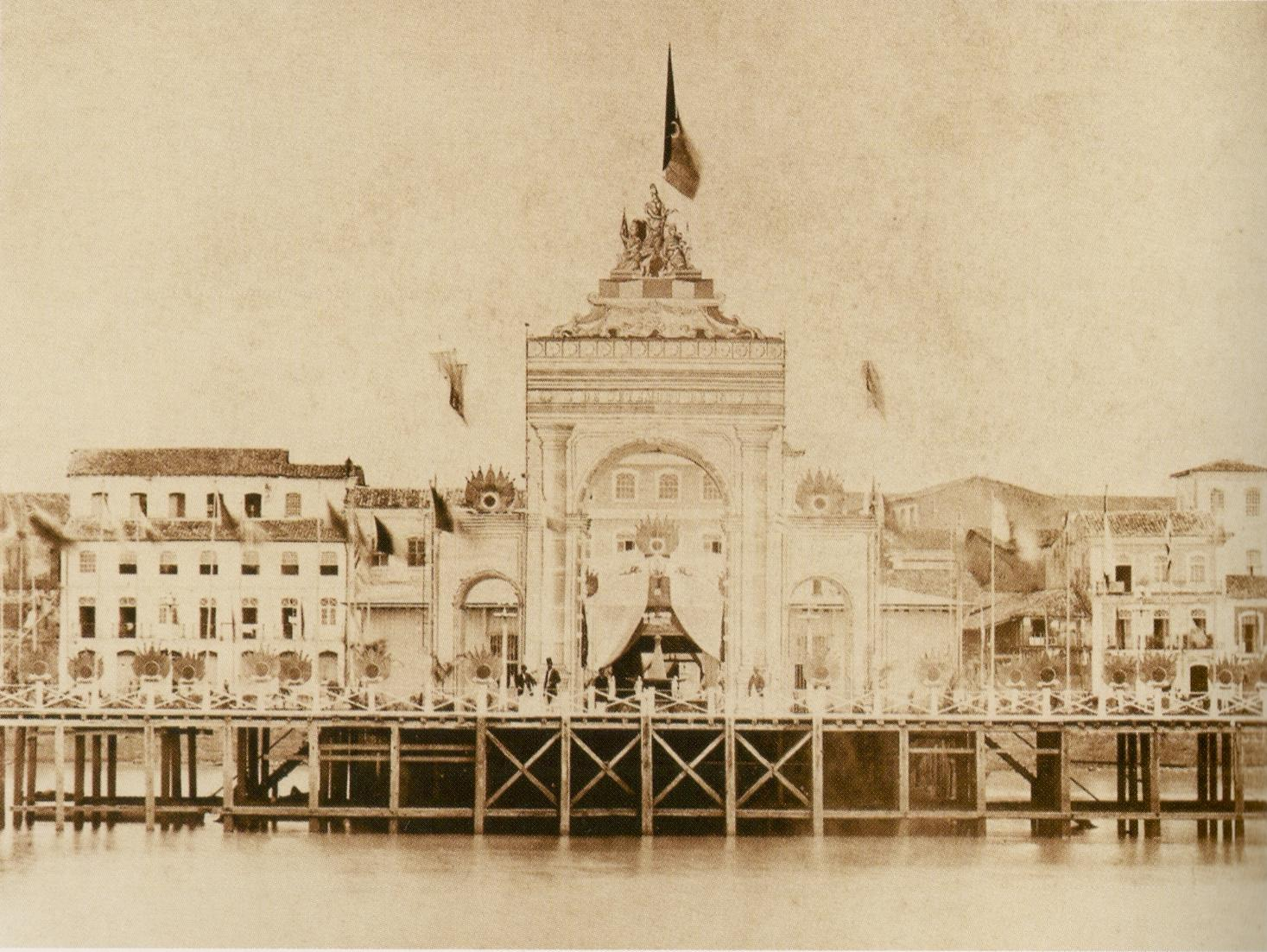
Triumphal Arch for the visit of Emperor Pedro II to Belém. Photograph by F. A. Fidanza (1867)

In 1866, the Amazon, Tocantins, Tapajós, Madeira, and Negro rivers were opened to navigation by merchant ships of all nations, contributing to the development of the capital of Pará. To consolidate this act and establish the imperial presence in the north after Cabanagem, it was announced that Pedro II would come to the city to officially announce the opening of the Amazon River. Thus, a Triumphal Arch was built by the Companhia do Amazonas to receive the emperor. But the Arch was not preserved, as it was a scenographic feature of the Companhia do Amazonas and not an actual architectural building. In this period photography began to have a greater presence and diffusion in Belém with the contribution of the Portuguese photographer Filipe Fidanza and with the arrival of Emperor Pedro II in 1867, an encourager of this art.

During the rubber cycle (1879 - 1912), Belém's commercial importance increased, mainly for the international rubber scenario. Being considered one of the most developed Brazilian cities, not only for its strategic position - coastal - but also because it hosted a greater number of banking houses, "rubber barons'" residences, and other important institutions. The peak of the cycle was between 1890 and 1920 when the city had technologies that cities in the southern and southeastern regions of Brazil did not yet have

At the end of the 19th century, the discourse of progress and social control based on science and sanitation (policy to combat the tenements or poor neighborhoods near the centers) was stimulated by the Republican elites' fear of the mass of workers (free and slaves) that were crowding into the cities and organized politically, but being interpreted as "savages." The application of city cleansing drove the popular sectors out of the centers and forced segregation into new peripheral neighborhoods, in the Republicans' attempt to build a "new man", a submissive but at the same time productive worker.

Going through the process of negation of African-Brazilian culture in the urbanization and modernization plan during the republicanism of Antônio Lemos, the black residents of the Umarizal neighborhood were forced to transfer to the peripheral neighborhoods of the city: Pedreira, Guamá, Jurunas, Cremação, Sacramenta. This dispersion turned the Pedreira neighborhood into a center of African-descendant culture. At this time, the indigenous had direct participation in the local economy, conquering reserved areas far from urban centers, to practice their culture after several conflicts with the colonizers. Thus growing, in contrast, the slave trade brought general work, emerging the figure of the caboclo who developed with miscegenation.

In this period, major buildings and infrastructure works were erected in the city. In 1869, Calandrine de Chermont began the construction of Theatro da Paz (1874), with the influence of neoclassical architecture and inaugurated in 1878 during the government of João Capistrano Bandeira de Melo Filho. It is considered one of the most luxurious theaters in Brazil and one of the country's monumental theaters. Other examples are the Olympia Cinema - the oldest in Brazil in operation - one of the most luxurious and modern of the time (opened in April 1912); the Ver-o-peso, the largest market in Latin America; and the Batista Campos Square. In 1868, the construction of the Antônio Lemos Palace (1873) began, to be the Municipal Palace, being inaugurated in 1883 during the government of Rufino Enéas Gustavo Galvão. Thus, these works attracted waves of foreign immigrants, such as Portuguese, French, Japanese, Spanish, and other smaller groups.

In 1883, the Provincial Government of Galvão (1882-1884) initiated the construction of the railroad Estrada de Ferro de Bragança (1984-1964), to transport the region's reasonable agricultural production (Note: Following the route of the Caminho do Maranhão, which connected Belém to Maranhão, created by the Tupinambá Indians and effected by Pedro Teixeira (military), with the mission to create the best land-fluvial way to Maranhão and a route for commercial transactions between Belém and Bragança, which before occurred only via the Caeté river, thus needing other route. Later it also served to conduct cattle coming from Piauí.) being inaugurated in 1884. In 1885, it gained another 29 kilometers, but construction work would be paralyzed until 1901, returning only in 1908, when it reached its maximum extension.

=== 20th century ===
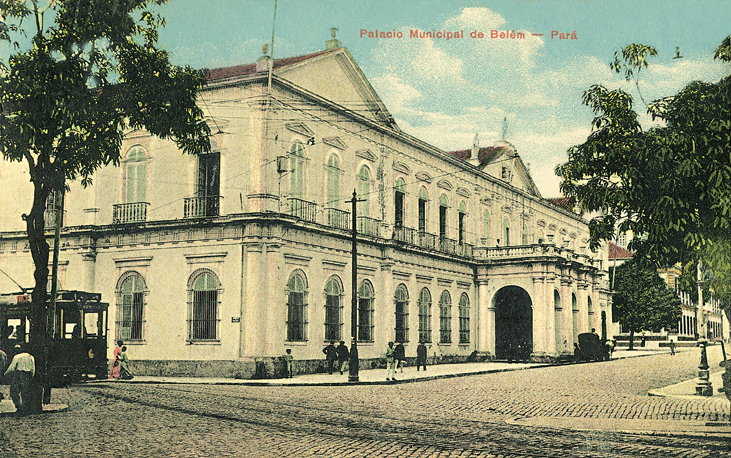
Antônio Lemos Palace in 1902.

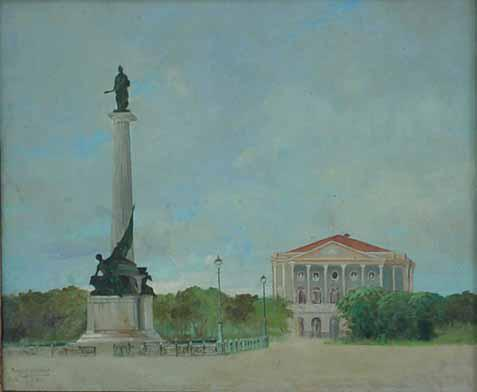
República Square in 1905, by Antônio Parreiras.

The money generated from the rubber trade was important for the urban restructuring of Belém, following Paris as a model. 1897 marked the beginning of the government of intendant Antônio Lemos (1897-1911), who modernized the capital at the beginning of the Republic, promoting an aesthetic and hygienic renovation of the city in the "Belle Époque of Belém" or the "Golden Age of Rubber" period. The project aimed to build a "Paris in America" with the influence of art deco architecture and the European belle époque. This also had the objective of attending to the new taste of the "latex elite" (especially the "rubber barons") and demonstrating to foreign investors that Belém was safe and salubrious, having the potential of becoming a financial, luxury, entertainment, and consumption center, despite most of the population being extremely poor.

At this time, photography appeared as a significant element, registering the urban transformations of senator Antônio Lemos, and serving as political propaganda for the achievements of his government. These records resulted in the "Belém Album", with a cover in low relief, produced in 1902 in Paris, under the direction of Filipe Augusto Fidanza and text by Henrique Santa Rosa. It built an idealized image, reinventing a social and cultural imagination in the Parisian and Lenist fashion.

Despite the intense modernization of the central neighborhoods through the rubber trade, some, such as Umarizal, still presented old/rural forms of occupation of the space, such as narrow villages, huts covered with straw or canvas, Portuguese pens, revealing the humble origins of the inhabitants. During the expansion of the city in the First Patrimonal League, the occupation of the city's flooded areas (typical Amazonian floodplains) were avoided for decades, as they required large resources for macro drainage, and were properties owned by a group of the local urban elite since the 18th century. Part of these were leased for agropastoral production transforming them into urban latifundium, which helped supply the population. They were precarious stables located "downtown", behind the residences where the grasslands served as food for the cattle, which in turn provided milk for the population and, where they also grew vegetables and flowers.

From the 1940s on, the city underwent two other major urban changes due to new trends in local civil construction and the city's spatial valorization plan. In the swampy areas, the cowsheds were plotted, originating passages with masonry residences, and in the higher and more valorized areas, the verticalization process began. There was an increase of the built density and the accentuated elevation of the height of the buildings; new modalities of social selectivity, characterized by bold architectural projects; the incorporation of leisure equipment in the condominium area. The high prices of the properties created a social-spatial segregation of the upper and middle-class social segments.

In the 1950s, the neighborhoods located in the northern and the southern zones had very expressive demographic growth rates, Marambaia reached an index of 112.04%, Sacramenta 210.69%, and; Sousa 201.22%. These were the so-called popular neighborhoods, in contrast to the old neighborhoods, such as Comércio with a decrease of 15.57%; Reduto 23, 21%, and; Cidade Velha a growth of 23.25%. In the 1960s, they continued to be the most populous neighborhoods in Belém, with about 280,000 people. Because they were occupied by a population considered poor and prolific, living in small precarious dwellings, in occupations of disorderly structure, characterized by tortuous streets with bushes, on the muddy banks of streams and creeks. While the central area emptied, due to the invasion of commerce and the local elite, the initial neighborhoods in the eastern zone stabilized in large blocks with wide avenues.

In this period the non-flooded lands of the First Patrimonial League of Belém were already occupied. With the advance of the Belém-Brasília highway, started in the 1950s by President Juscelino Kubitschek, urban growth was leveraged as well as real estate expansion (in an unplanned way) in the floodplain areas, through the construction of housing and population settlements with large blocks and wide avenues. These areas were built for the resettled people from the infrastructure works in the center and due to the invasion of commerce by the local elite, in the road axes of the BR-316. But this expansion was initially not successful, because the mobility infrastructure did not keep up, increasing the costs of commuting to the center.

In 1960, the main campus of the Federal University of Pará was inaugurated in Belém and in this same year the Belém-Bragança railroad was deactivated, due to the fall in revenues caused by the advance of the highways. In 1965, the Minister of Aviation Juarez Távora ordered the destruction of the locomotives and the main railroad stations in the state, under the justification of annual deficit, thus demolishing the São Brás Railroad Station and building the Belém Bus Station.

From the 1990s on, there was the second expansion in the Nova Belém area, with the construction of high-income condominiums on the Augusto Montenegro highway.

From 1995 on, the Orla Livre Movement began, to debate the irregular occupation of the banks of the Guamá River and of the Guajará Bay, fighting for the population's rights through leisure, culture, and sports spaces, the valorization of the historical heritage, tourism, and housing, and also seeking the creation of an Integrated Management Plan for the Belém waterfront.

=== 21st century ===
Initially, the Ver-o-Rio complex, Praça Princesa Isabel, and Vila da Barca were built in a process of valuation and appropriation of areas on the city's waterfront, following the determination of the City Statute (Federal Law 10 257/2001) and the Urban Master Plan that determine the creation of Special Social Interest Zones (ZEIS).

The actions of Orla Livre intensified during the years 2012 to 2014, with the need to combat the implementation of several residential real estate projects on the banks of the Guamá River and Guajará Bay, which are Permanent Preservation Areas (APP).

The 2025 United Nations Climate Change Conference (COP30) was held at the Hangar Convention Centre in Belém from 10 to 21 November 2025.
