= Palace of the Eleven Windows =

Brazilian historical building

- Palacete das Onze Janelas
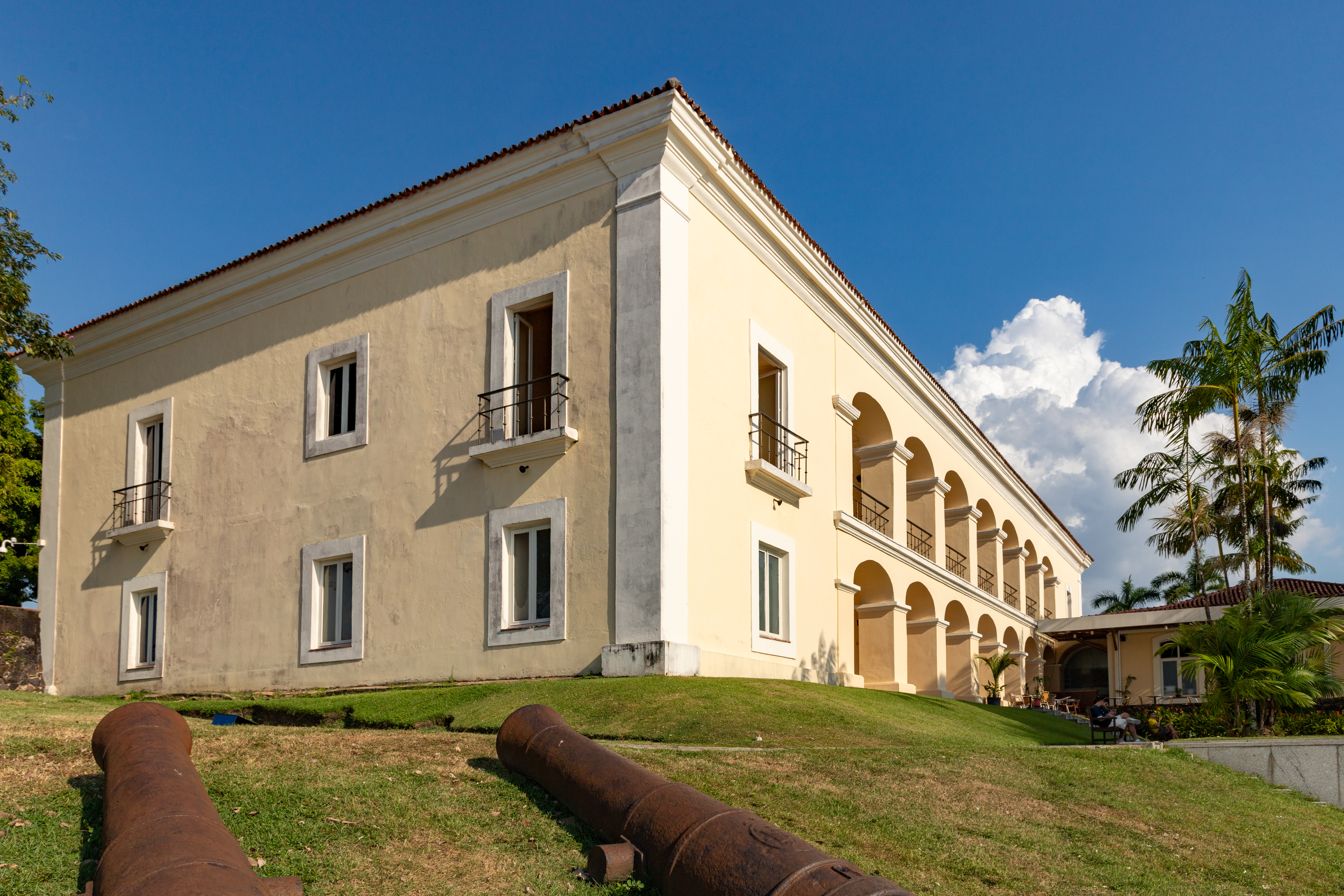
- Location: Belém, Brazil
- Coordinates: 1°27′18.27″S 48°30′20.772″W
- Type: mansion, military hospital, museum of modern art, historical heritage
- Website: https://museus.pa.gov.br/museus/6/espao-cultural-casa-das-onze-janelas

The House of the Eleven Windows Cultural Space (Portuguese: Espaço Cultural Casa das Onze Janelas), initially called Palace of the Eleven Windows (Portuguese: Palacete das Onze Janelas), is a complex composed of a public square and a historical building located in the Brazilian city of Belém, in Pará.

Since 2002 in Brazil, the space houses a contemporary art museum, along with a restaurant and a multicultural area.

The building, which was built in the 18th century as a resting house for Domingos da Costa Bacelar, is part of the historical complex called Feliz Lusitânia, which corresponds to the initial historical core of the city of Belém do Pará.

== History ==
The Palace of the Eleven Windows was built in the 18th century as the weekend residence of Domingos da Costa Bacelar, owner of the sugarcane mills located at the mouth of the Guamá River.

In 1768, the palace was acquired by the then government of the Captaincy of Grão-Pará to house the Royal Military Hospital, since Belém did not have one yet. However, the building had to be adapted by Italian architect Giuseppe Antonio Landi for hospital use. The hospital functioned in the palace until the end of the 19th century, in the period of the Province of Grão-Pará, but still maintained military functions in the following years, housing the Fifth Company of the Guard, after 1870. During Brazil's dictatorial period, the building was also used as a place of detention and torture of political prisoners, sheltering the Army Subsistence.

In 2001, to benefit the city's history and tourism, the state government created the Feliz Lusitânia (English: Happy Lusitania) Project, which aimed to revitalize the initial historic nucleus of Belém. To this end, the government signed an agreement with the Brazilian Army, alienating the grounds of the Palace of the Eleven Windows and the Castle Fortress, turning them into historic buildings.

In 2002 the palace was transformed into a cultural space and museum dedicated to contemporary Brazilian art from the North and Northeast regions. However, in 2016, the museum suffered political pressure from the government to be extinguished and replaced by a gastronomic center, putting at risk the collection of modern and contemporary art that has works by artists such as Tarsila do Amaral, Rubens Gerchman and Ismael Nery, as well as works by contemporary photographers in the city.

== Tourism ==
The building is part of the architectural and landscaping complex called Feliz Lusitânia and houses, besides the museum space, the restaurant Boteco das Onze.

The area surrounding Palace of the Eleven Windows has a set of cultural facilities, such as the Sculpture Garden, the Corveta ship, and a stage that projects over the bay. From the building there is also a view of the Guajará Bay and the Ver-o-Peso Market.

The Tourist Complex Feliz Lusitânia is composed of:

- Castle Fortress;
- Palace of the Eleven Windows;
- Saint Alexander Church / Museum of Sacred Art (former Episcopal Palace);
- Our Lady of Grace Cathedral;
- Castle Hill/North Street (actual Siqueira Mendes Street);
- Círio Museum;
- Lauro Sodré Palace / Historical Museum of the State of Pará (MEP);
- Antônio Lemos Palace/Belém Museum of Art (MAB);

== Architecture and art ==
On the main facade, the two-story building has eleven symmetrically arranged openings in the form of windows and window-doors, with straight lintels and preceded by railings, as well as the main door. The massive volume is divided by a simple entablature with pilasters at the wedges, constituting a robust and simple solution, in the taste of the Portuguese architecture of the plain style period. The facade facing the river is more elaborate, denoting the intervention of Italian architect Antonio Landi, with arched openings in the central body and loggias (galleries) in the form of balconies with railings on the upper floor and open at the bottom. The building, when it was converted to military use, suffered many interventions. In the external area, the most relevant changes were the addition of a triangular pediment, flanked by obelisks on the main facade, and the disfiguring closing of the openings on the side facing the river. These modifications were reversed during renovations carried out in the 2000s.

Since 2002, the palace houses the House of the Eleven Windows Art Museum, which has a vast collection of modern and contemporary works with names such as Tarsila do Amaral, Ismael Nery, Rubens Gerchman, Lasar Segall, Luiz Braga, Miguel Chikaoka, Alexandre Sequeira, Elza Lima, and Walda Marques. It is the most important building to host the two largest national art awards held in the state, the Contemporary Photography Diary Award and Art Pará. However, the museum is at risk of being neglected by the Pará State Government, putting the collection and the cultural life of the city and the state at risk.

== See also ==
- Mannerism in Brazil
- History of Belém
- Dom Frei Caetano Brandão Square
