= Gisele Camargo =

Brazilian visual artist

Gisele Camargo was born on July 11, 1970, in Rio de Janeiro, Brazil. She is a Brazilian painter and photographer who works in photography, video, and painting. She is best known for her pictorial meditations on urban and cinematic landscapes. She was formally trained at the Escola de Belas-Artes (EBA) of the Universidade Federal do Rio de Janeiro in the late 1990s. While in the institution, Camargo was part of a group of students who concentrated on issues of urban experience and visual culture in Rio de Janeiro. Camargo was different from the rest of her classmates; while they engaged mostly with multimedia language, she remained a painter, with sporadic forays into photography and photocollage.

== Exhibitions ==
Gisele Camargo's art focuses on landscapes, spaces, and architecture, and often portrays empty landscapes or places without time reference. With straight angles and contrasts between light and shadow, she occupies her exhibition spaces creating fluid narratives. Camargo participated in exhibitions such as Cruzamentos-Arte Contemporânea Brasileria, organized by Jennifer Lange, Chris Stults and Paulo Venancio Fiho at the Wexner Center for the Arts in Ohio. She also participated in Nova Art Nova, organized by Paulo Venancio Fiho at Centro Cultural Banco, and Falsa Espera at the Museum of Contemporary Art in Rio de Janeiro. Camargo's work has been exhibited extensively throughout Rio de Janeiro, and collected internationally. In 2013, she was awarded the Art Heritage Award from IPHAN, and in 2011, she received the Ibram prize for Contemporary Art. She also received the Sim Visual Arts Prize in 2008.

== Camargo's Work ==
=== Solo ===
- (1998) Sala de Paisagem Contemporânea – Museu Antonio Parreiras, Niterói.
- (2000) Pequena Galeria do Centro Cultural Cândido Mendes, Rio de Janeiro.
- (2006) Prêmio Projéteis de Arte Contemporânea, FUNARTE – Palácio Gustavo Capanema, Galeria Mezanino, Rio de Janeiro.
- (2009) Panavison – Amarelonegro Arte Contemporânea, Rio de Janeiro.
- (2011) A Capital – Galeria IBEU, Rio de Janeiro.
- (2011) Metrópole – Galeria Mercedes Viegas, Rio de Janeiro.
- (2012) Falsa Espera – Museu de Arte Contemporânea de Niterói, Niterói.
- (2012) Falsa Espera – Galeria Oscar Cruz, São Paulo.
- (2014) Noite Americana ou Luas Invisíveis, Luciana Caravello Arte Contemporânea.
- (2015) Cápsulas e Luas [Capsules and Moons], Paço Imperial, RJ (Parte do Prêmio Arte e Patrimônio IPHAN)

=== Group ===
- (2007) Velatura Sólida – Amarelonegro Arte Contemporânea, Rio de Janeiro, RJ
- (2007) Entre Postes – Galeria do Poste – Niterói, RJ
- (2008) Arte pela Amazônia – curadoria Ricardo Ribenboim – Fundação Bienal de São Paulo, São Paulo, SP
- (2008) FOTO – Centro Cultural Laurinda Santos Lobo, Rio de Janeiro, RJ
- (2008) Prêmio Sim de Artes Visuais – curadoria Marisa Flórido – Palace of the Eleven Windows, Belém, PA
- (2008) Nova Arte Nova – curadoria Paulo Venâncio Filho – Centro Cultural Banco do Brasil, Rio de Janeiro, RJ
- (2009) Nova Arte Nova – curadoria Paulo Venâncio Filho – Centro Cultural Banco do Brasil, São Paulo, SP
- (2010) Além do Horizonte – curadoria Daniela Name – Galeria Amarelonegro, Rio de Janeiro, RJ
- (2010) Entre – curadoria Ivair Reinaldim – Galeria IBEU, Rio de Janeiro, RJ
- (2010) O Lugar da Linha – curadoria Felipe Scovino – Paço das Artes, São Paulo, SP
- (2010) O Lugar da Linha – curadoria Felipe Scovino – MAC, Niterói, RJ
- (2011) Coletiva 11 – Galeria Mercedes Viegas, Rio de Janeiro.
- (2011) Dez anos do instituto Tomie Ohtake – curadoria Agnaldo Farias e Thiago Mesquita – São Paulo.
- (2012) Paisagens Artificiais – curadoria Felipe Scovino – Galeria Pilar, São Paulo.
- (2013) Cinéticos e Construtivos – Curadoria Ligia Canongia – Galeria Carbono, São Paulo.
- (2014) Duplo Olhar Coleção Sergio Carvalho – Curadoria Denise Mattar – Paço das Artes, São Paulo.
- (2014) Cruzamentos: Contemporary Art in Brazil Wexner Center for the Arts, Columbus, Ohio.
- (2015) Vértice – Coleção Sergio Carvalho, Museu Nacional dos Correios, Brasília.
- (2015) TRIO Bienal, Bienal Tridimensional, curadoria Marcus de Lontra Costa, Rio de Janeiro.
