= Lauro Sodré Palace =

Brazilian historical building

- Palácio Lauro Sodré
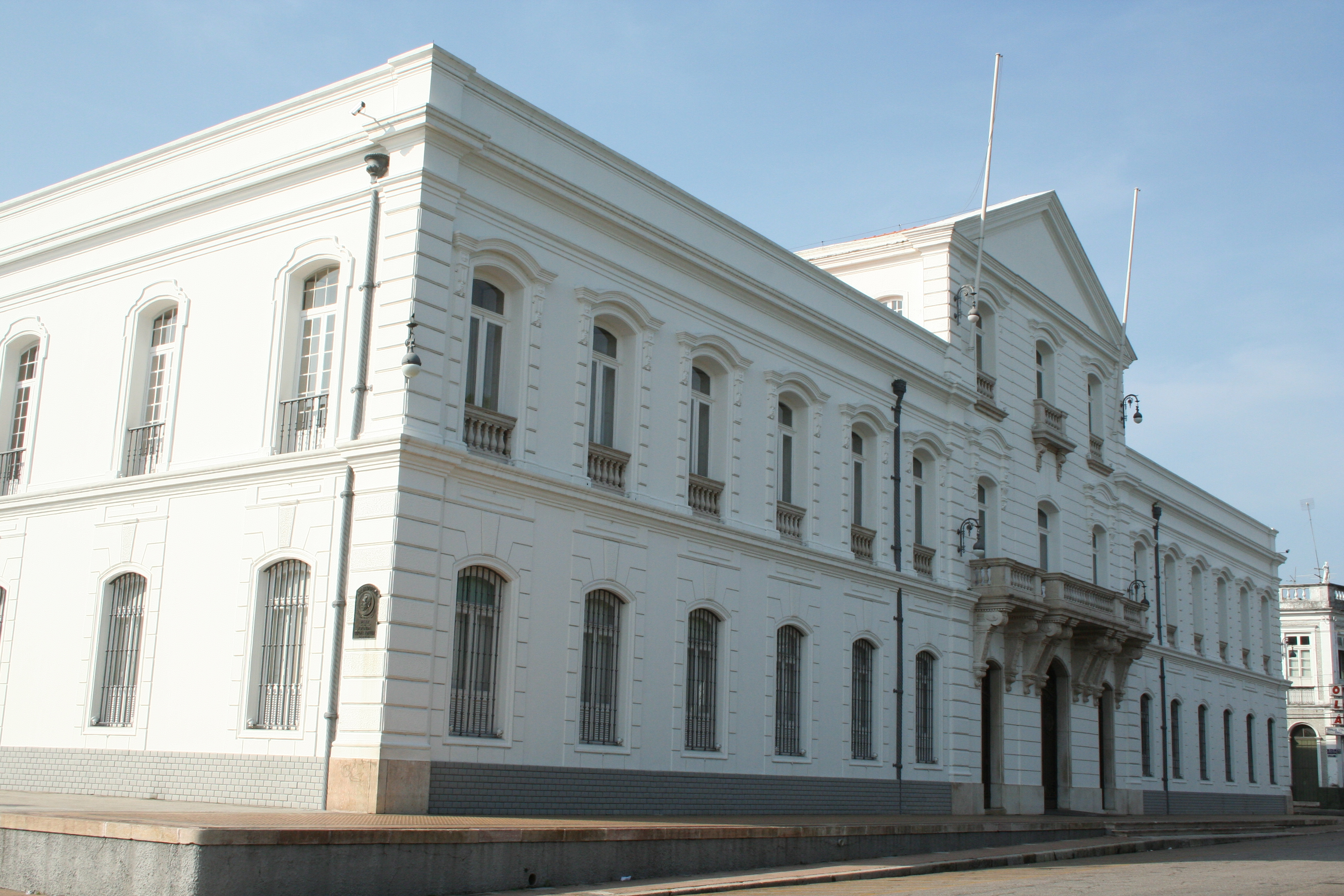
- Established: 1771
- Location: Belém, Pará; Brazil
- Coordinates: 1°27′22.622″S 48°30′10.991″W
- Type: Palace, museum, historical building

Lauro Sodré Palace (Portuguese: Palácio Lauro Sodré), also called Government Palace (Portuguese: Palácio do Governo), and initially called Residence House (Portuguese: Casa de Residência), is a public building, palace, museum and seat of the state government, built in 1680 and located in the neighborhood of Cidade Velha, in the Brazilian city of Belém, in the state of Pará.

It was designed in the classical Italian style by the Bolognese architect Antonio Landi, technician of the Kingdom, at the request of the governor of Grão-Pará, Manuel Bernardo Mello de Castro, and inaugurated by the Portuguese colonial administrator João Pereira Caldas to be the headquarters of the Portuguese government as the palace of the governors of the State of Grão-Pará and Maranhão.

In 1994, during the administration of governor Jader Barbalho, the palace was transformed into the Pará State Museum (MEP), housing several forms of artistic manifestations, from visual arts exhibitions to video-mapping projections on its facade. It is also called the King's Palace, due to rumors that it was made to house King Joseph I and the royal family.

== History ==
The palace where the museum is located is a beautiful example of Landi's architecture, and was built to house the seat of the State of Grão-Pará and Maranhão, which had moved from São Luis to Belém, in the 18th century, when the State capital of Brazil was also moving from Salvador to Rio de Janeiro.

=== Construction ===
In 1754, during the Pombaline period, Friar Miguel de Bulhões, replacing Governor Mendonça Furtado, requested an inspection of the Government Palace, which indicated the need to use propping to prevent it from collapsing. In 1757, unable to remain in the building, the administration of the captaincy reports to the Court the relocation to a rented house. In 1759, Governor Manuel Bernardo Mello de Castro communicates to the Court the situation of the palace and requests an inspection by the Kingdom's technicians, of which the architect Antônio Landi and the engineers Galluzie and Manuel Mendes were part. The commission certifies the state of ruin in which the building was in and suggests its demolition with the use of some tiles and pieces of wood.

The governor then asks Landi for a project of a "decent house without superfluities", stating that the building must not be at great expense, and submits it to the Court. In 1761, still without a reply, the governor addressed the king, sending a new floor plan elaborated by Landi. The first proposal consisted of a drawing with a facade and a cross section. In the cross section are identified: an entrance portico with an upper terrace behind the facade, a main access atrium with vaulted roof and a staircase developed in a vaulted space. The facade, horizontal and symmetrical, shows two floors and an exposed roof with eaves, set on a cornice. The second project shows a floor plan, the main facade, identical to the previous project, and a longitudinal section. In this version, the floor plan shows a central inner courtyard, surrounded by arcades in the Italian cortile style.

With the project's approval, Captain-General Fernando da Costa Athaide Teive asked Landi for a new project with more "impact" so that the house could be up to the level of the governors and captains who lived there. Faced with such a request, in 1767, the project was reformulated aiming at the large scale that is presented until today.

In 1768, construction began under the direction of the mason Jerônimo da Silva. It was necessary to purchase three adjacent lots for the building to achieve the desired size. The work on the palace was completed in 1771, but it was only occupied the following year by João Pereira Caldas.

The palace was modified over the years, but the structure remained the same. After the proclamation of the republic, there was a movement to remove symbols that marked the monarchy, so the building was redecorated in the republican manner and received its current name in honor of Governor Lauro Sodré, the first after the proclamation.

== Cabanagem ==
On January 6, 1835, led by Antônio Vinagre, the rebels stormed the government palace in Belém, where they remained in control until 1837, when they abandoned the city and fled to the interior of Pará to continue fighting.

== Feliz Lusitânia Tourist Complex ==
The Lauro Sodré Palace is part of the Feliz Lusitânia Tourist Complex, which is composed of:

- Castle Fort;
- Palace of the Eleven Windows;
- Saint Alexander Church / Museum of Sacred Art (former Episcopal Palace);
- Our Lady of Grace Cathedral;
- Castle Hill/North Street (current Siqueira Mendes Street);
- Círio Museum;
- Lauro Sodré Palace / Pará State Museum (MEP);
- Antônio Lemos Palace / Belém Museum of Art (MAB);

== Historical Heritage ==
The palace is protected by the National Institute of Historic and Artistic Heritage (IPHAN), located on Portugal Avenue, next to the headquarters of the Judiciary and Legislative Power of the state, where there are also other buildings listed as heritage: the Ver-o-Peso Dock, the Clock Square, the Dom Pedro II Square, the Antônio Lemos Palace, and the Baron of Guajará Manor House.

== See also ==
- Feliz Lusitânia

== Further Readings ==
- Trindade, Elna Maria. "Palácio e residência dos governadores da capitania do Grão-Pará e Maranhão. O projecto de Landi" (PDF). CEPESE: 10.
