= Pará State Museum =

Museum in Pará, Brazil

- Museu do Estado do Pará
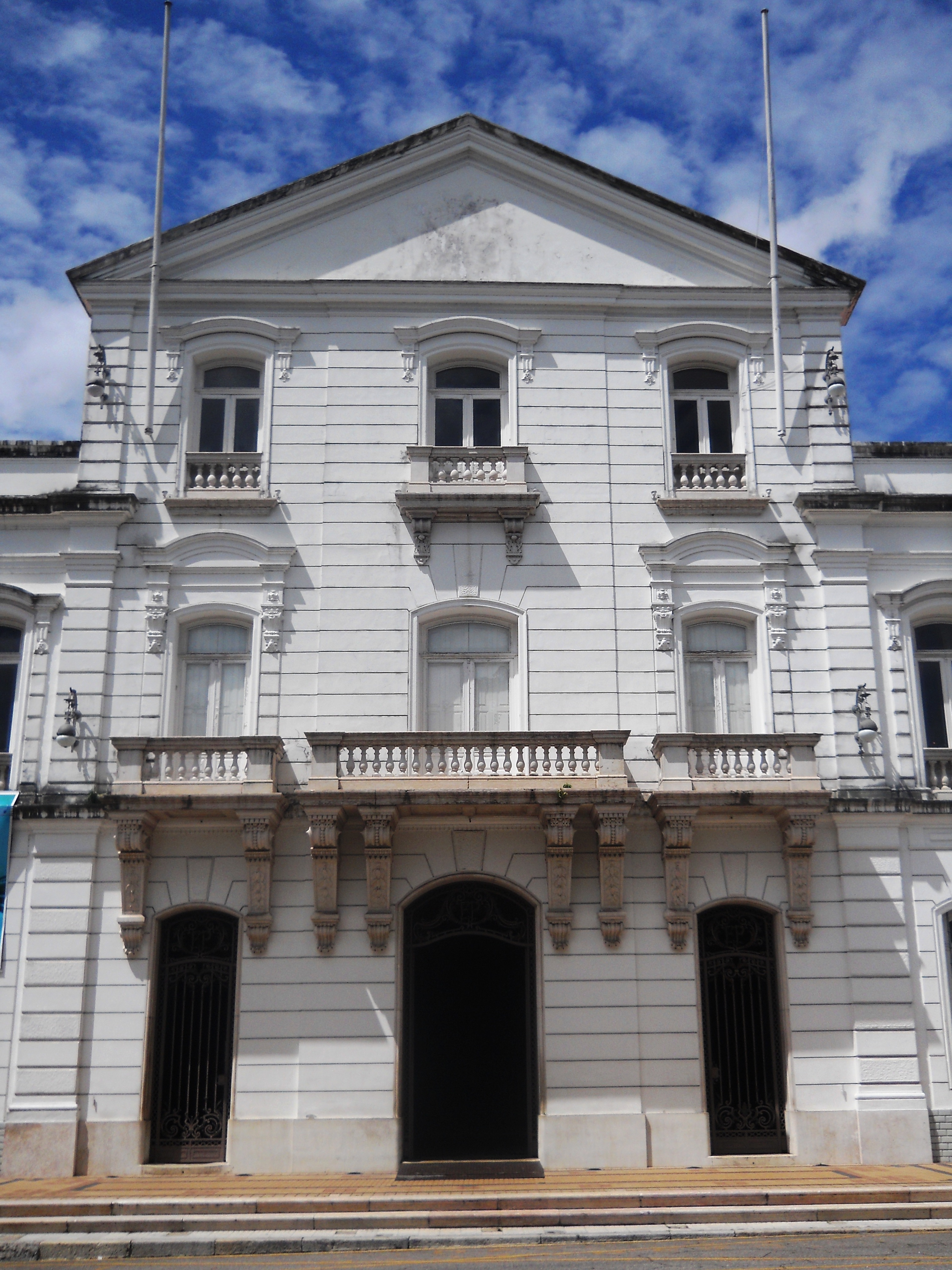
- Main facade of Lauro Sodré Palace
- Established: 1981
- Location: Belém, Pará; Brazil
- Coordinates: 1°27′22.622″S 48°30′10.991″W
- Type: Art museum
- Director: Dayseane Ferraz (2023)
- Website: museus.pa.gov.br/museus/5/museu-do-estado-do-par

The Pará State Museum (Portuguese: Museu do Estado do Pará), officially the Pará State Historical Museum (Museu Histórico do Estado do Pará), or MHEP, is a Brazilian government institute created in 1981 and currently housed in the Lauro Sodré Palace, in the Cidade Velha district of Belém. It hosts a variety of exhibitions by contemporary artists and promotes documentation, collection research, scientific dissemination and the preservation of Pará's social and historical memory.

It began its activities in 1986 at the Tancredo Neves Cultural Center (Centur) with a collection that included donations of private pieces as well as items from other state government agencies. In 1987, the museum's headquarters were moved to Bolonha Mansion and, in 1994, to the Lauro Sodré Palace, the seat of the state government.

The palace where the museum is housed is a fine example of Antonio Landi's architecture and was built to be the headquarters of the then Captaincy of Grão-Pará. The museum consists of galleries, a studio, an archive, an auditorium, a library and different themed rooms, such as the Pompeian, Empire, Renaissance, Art Nouveau and Neoclassical. It also contains numerous examples of furniture, paintings and decorative arts from the 19th and 20th centuries.

The institution is run by the Integrated System of Museums and Memorials (SIMM), subordinate to the Executive Secretary of the State of Pará for Culture (Secult). It is responsible for preserving, encouraging and disseminating the collection in its area of competence, with a view to the development and cultural improvement of the state of Pará.

== History ==
In the 18th century, Portugal and Spain signed the Treaty of Madrid, a document that defined the boundaries between their respective South American colonies and allowed technicians from Europe to come to Pará (a process mediated by General Francisco Xavier de Mendonça Furtado, brother of the Marquis of Pombal) such as geologists, mathematicians and architects, like Antônio José Landi, who was hired to design a government palace. Designed between 1762 and 1771, the venue was built to accommodate the Portuguese Court that would reside in the Amazon, in accordance with the decisions of the Marquis of Pombal (then Minister to King Joseph I).

The Lauro Sodré Palace was built with indigenous labor during the government of Bernardo de Mello e Castro and inaugurated on November 21, 1772, under João Pereira Caldas. Initially, it served as the seat of government of the newly created State of Grão-Pará and Rio Negro (after the division of the State of Grão-Pará and Maranhão into two administrative units) and home to the governors and captains-general of the Captaincy of Grão-Pará. In 1793, the first procession of the Círio de Nazaré, a religious devotion inherited from the Portuguese colonizers, departed from the site.

In the 19th century, the official accession of Pará to the independence of Brazil in August 1823 and the death of Bernardo Lobo de Souza during the Cabanada in January 1835 by the native Domingos Onça marked the history of the palace. Subsequently, the venue received several political interferences, such as changes to its architectural structure at the request of Governor Augusto Montenegro, with the creation of five noble halls.

After the museum was created in 1981, it began its activities in 1986 on the fourth floor of the Tancredo Neves Cultural Center (CENTUR) and was later relocated to the Bolonha Mansion, where it operated until 1994, when it was moved to the Lauro Sodré Palace, its current location.

== Features ==
Upon entering the museum's current building, visitors encounter a large staircase leading to the collection, which is composed of utensils, works of art and furniture. The objects created to compose the seat of government and which portrayed the wealth of Pará's rulers are now part of the museum's archive, such as vases, flower boxes, chandeliers, sculptures, furniture, paintings and chandeliers. The building consists of an auditorium, a library and several rooms, such as the Eclectic Hall, a space decorated by the French artist Joseph Cassé in the neo-Renaissance style that incorporated decorative elements based on the historical lines of the Western tradition with neoclassical and neo-Gothic elements and served as the governor's private office.

The Renaissance Hall, the palace's most important room, is decorated with cast steel from the United States, purchased by Governor Lauro Sodré in 1894. It includes the canvas A conquista da Amazônia, by the painter Antônio Parreiras, commissioned by Governor Augusto Montenegro to decorate a particular hall. There is also the Empire Hall, decorated by Joseph Cassé and designed as an antechamber to the palace's Hall of Honor, featuring a series of monuments depicting modern ideals.

The museum also has the governors' gallery, the Vicente Sales, Antônio Landi and Plácido de Souza rooms, the Open Studio and the Art Nouveau and Pompeian halls. Information is disseminated in three ways: social networks, printed newspapers and the website of the Integrated System of Museums and Memorials.

== See also ==
- Museu Paraense Emílio Goeldi
- Belém Museum of Art
