= Benedito Calixto =

Brazilian painter

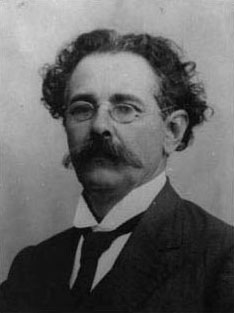
- Born: 14 October 1853; Itanhaém
- Died: 31 May 1927; São Paulo
- Education: Académie des beaux-arts
- Occupation: Painter

Benedito Calixto de Jesus (14 October 1853 – 31 May 1927) was a Brazilian painter. His works usually depicted figures from Brazil and Brazilian culture, including a famous portrait of the bandeirante Domingos Jorge Velho in 1923, Proclamation of the Brazilian Republic in 1893 and scenes from the coastline of São Paulo. Unlike many artists of the time, Calixto's patron was an individual other than the state, who were "the most dependable source of patronage."

== Gallery ==
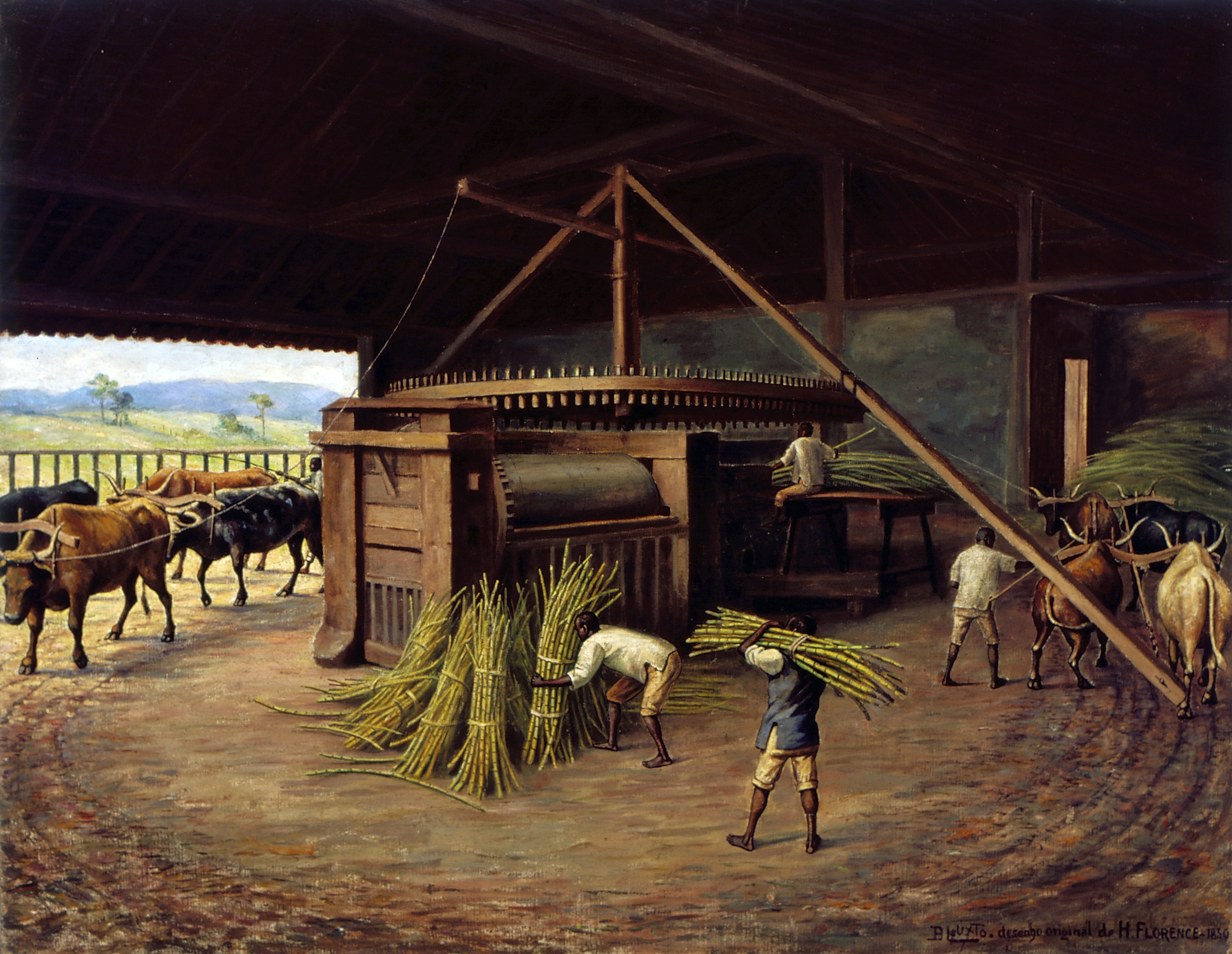
Sugarcane crushing in Cacheira Farm in Campinas

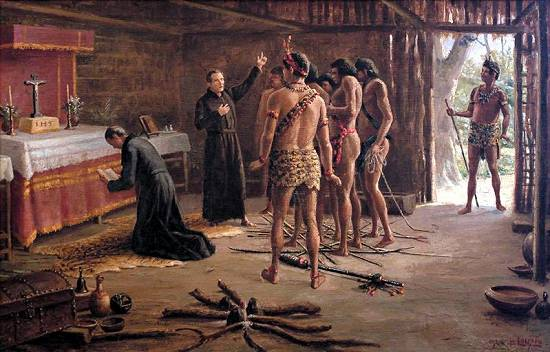
Anchieta e Nóbrega na cabana de Pindobuçu

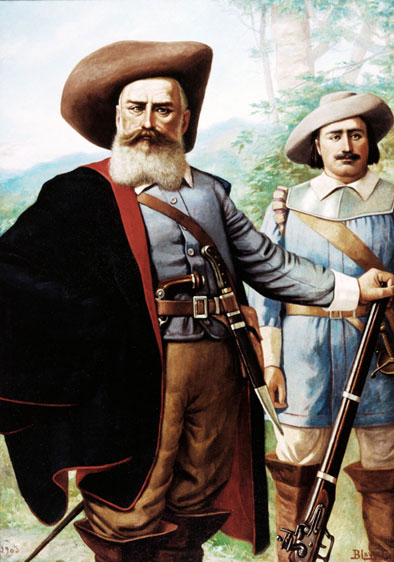
Domingos Jorge Velho

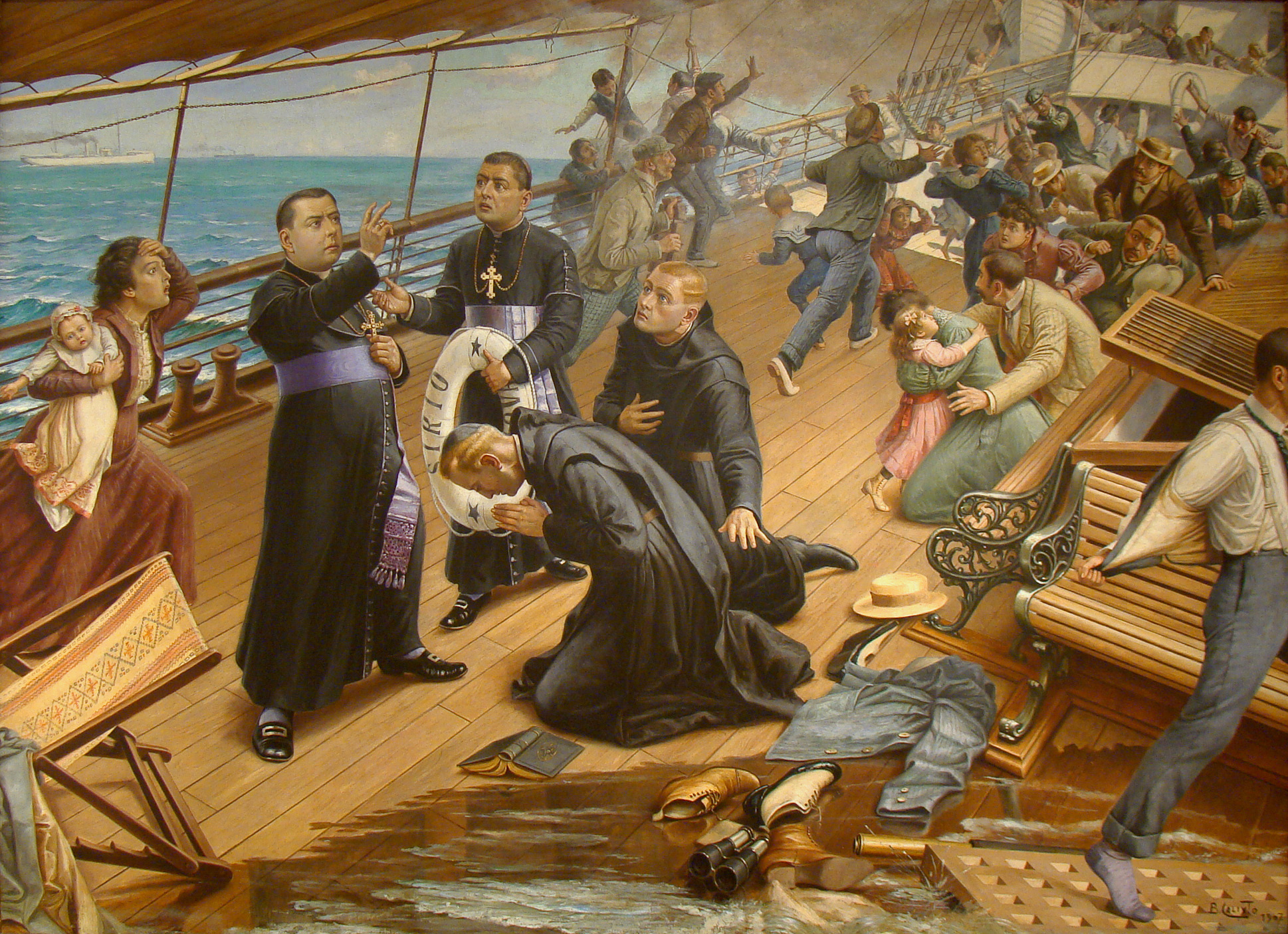
The sinking of the SS Sirio

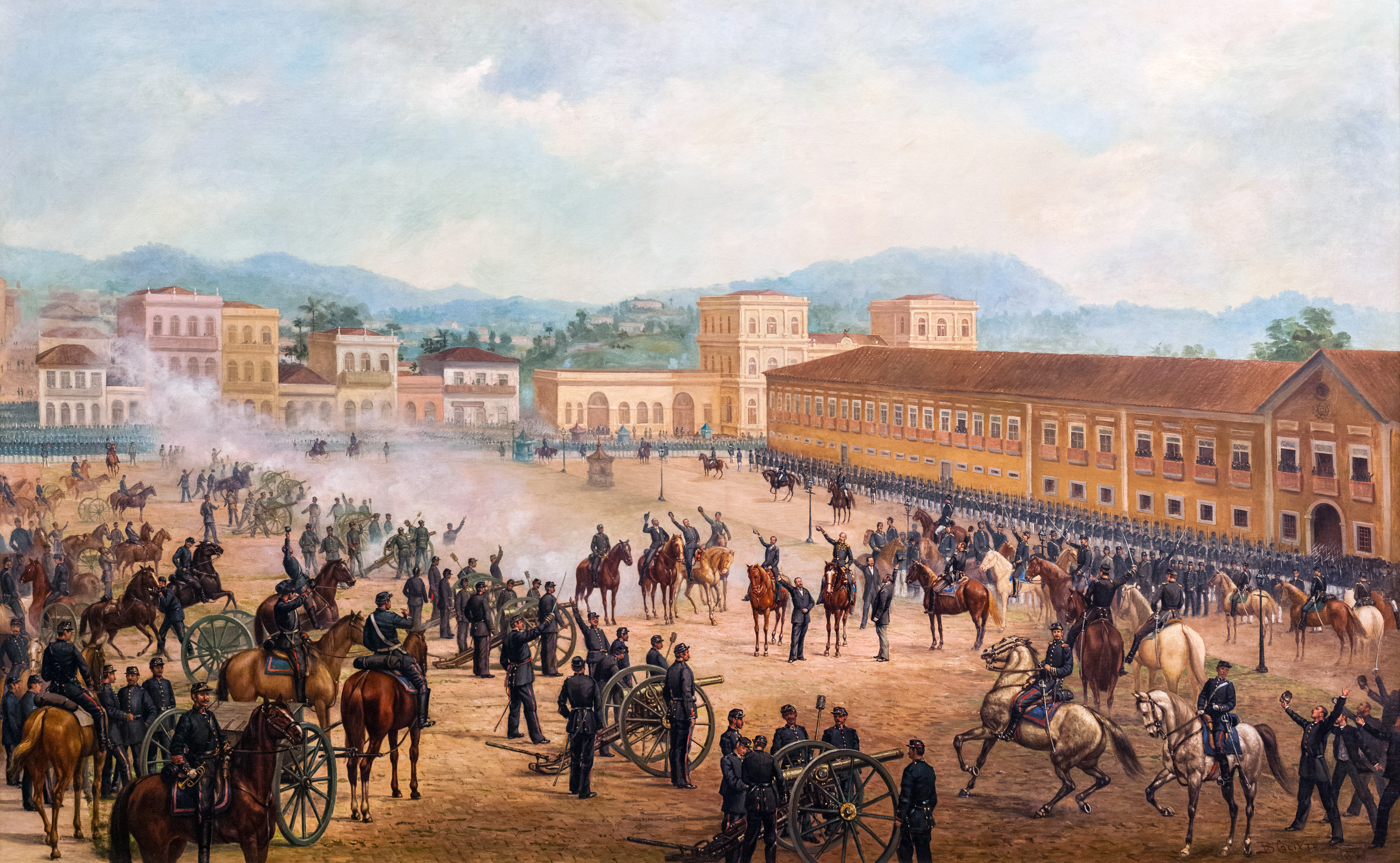
Proclamation of the Brazilian Republic

== See also ==
- Belém Museum of Art
