= Antônio Lemos Palace =

Palace in Belém, Pará, Brazil

- Palácio Antônio Lemos
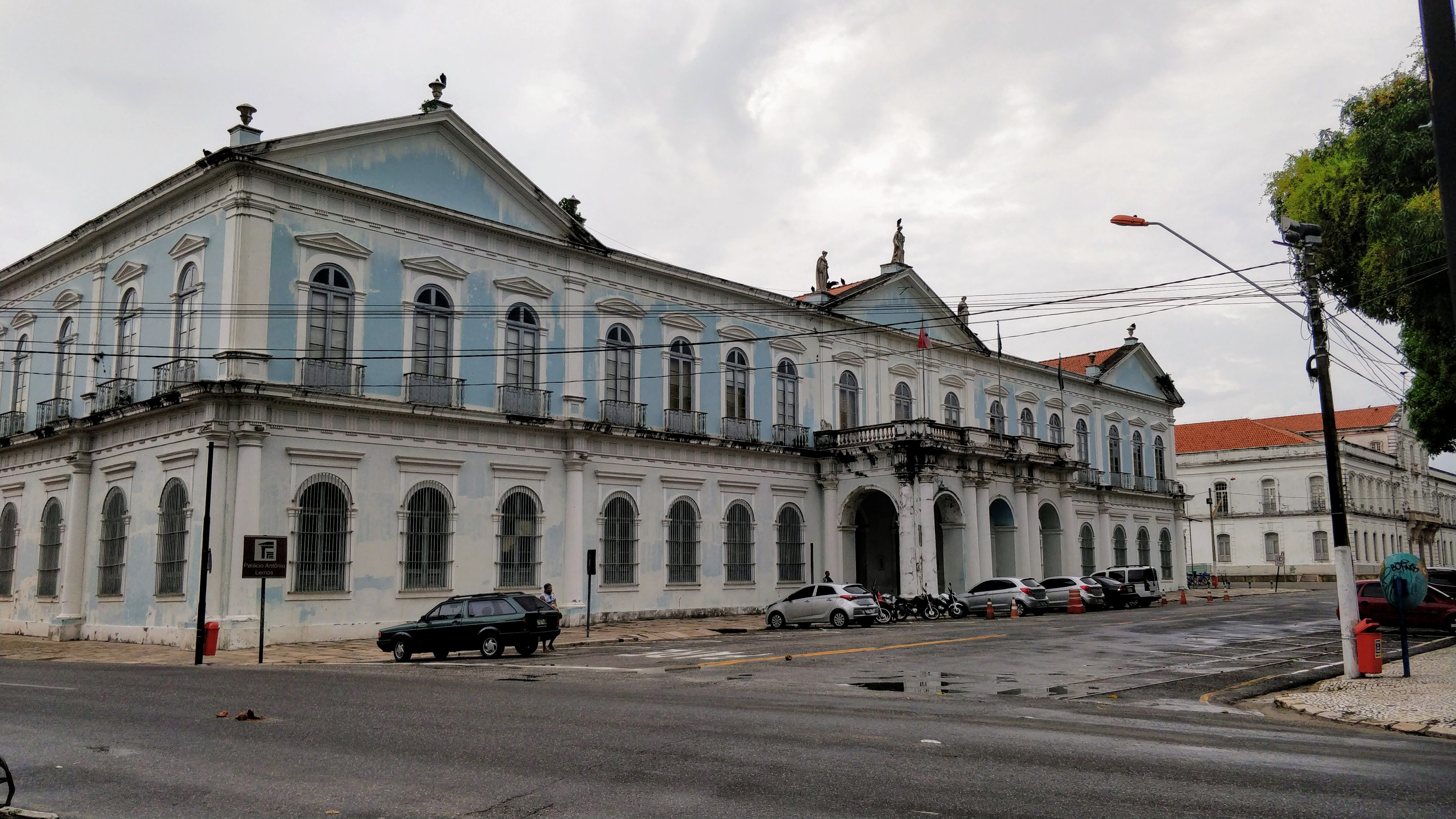
- Interactive map of the Antônio Lemos Palace area

General information
- Type: Palace
- Location: Belém, Pará, Brazil
- Coordinates: 1°27′21″S 48°30′16″W
- Named for: Antônio Lemos
- Opened: 1806

Design and construction
- Awards: Property listed by IPHAN, Heritage of Portuguese Influence (database)

The Palácio Antônio Lemos (originally called "Palacete Azul", or "Casa no Largo do Palácio"), also called the Belém Art Museum, is a public building, palace, museum, and the city hall of Belém, built in 1860 by José da Gama Abreu, in the context of the rubber cycle. It is located in the Cidade Velha neighborhood.

Since 1994, this has been the official seat of the Municipal Power and Museum of the Art of Belém (MABE).

== History ==
Initially, it was called Palacete Azul ("Blue Palace"), due to the color of its façade, and was renamed in the 1950s in honor of Antônio Lemos, the capital's intendant in the period 1897–1911, who was responsible for the city's urbanization and modernization process.

In 1860, it was designed by José da Gama Abreu, in the late neoclassical style. In 1883 it received an enlargement and modifications by Antonio Landi. Again in 1911, the intendant Antonio Lemos added coverings, furniture, and objects according to European fashion, signed by masters such as Capranesi, De Angelis, and Teodoro Braga, rivaling Rio de Janeiro and São Paulo.

== Historical heritage ==
The palace is protected by the National Institute of Historic and Artistic Heritage (IPHAN). In the area, there are other buildings protected as heritage: the Ver-o-Peso Dock, the Clock Square, the Dom Pedro II Square, the Lauro Sodré Palace (Government Palace), and the Solar da Beira.

== See also ==
- Historic site
- History of Belém
