= Portuguese Plain Style architecture =

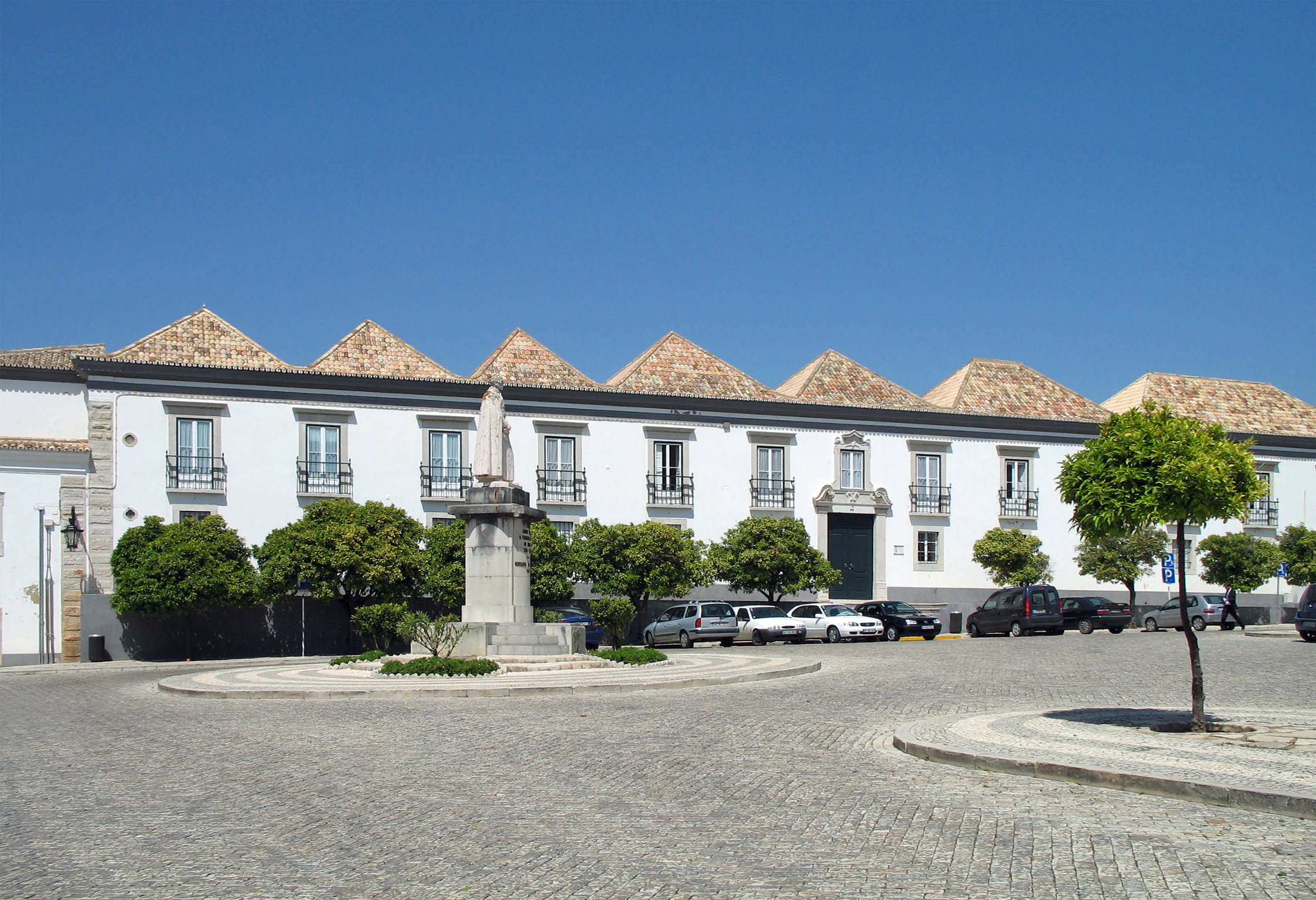
Bishops palace in Faro, Portugal

Portuguese Plain Style architecture (Estilo Chão in Portuguese) refers to a 16th century Portuguese architectural style related to early Mannerism marked by austerity and sobriety of form. The term was coined by the American art historian George Kubler, who defines this style as "vernacular architecture, related to the traditions of a living dialect more than to the great authors of Classical Antiquity". This same author traces the origin of this style back to suggestions by Italian military architects, although there may be influences from Northern Europe and from the Portuguese architectural tradition itself.

Although often associated with the unadorned Spanish style, the truth is that this style predates the Spanish one by about a decade, corresponding to a change in taste during the reign of King John III of Portugal, in which the monarch sought "clarity, order, proportion and simplicity". Compared with the Spanish style, the human scale has not been lost in the buildings that follow this style. It was first given expression in a series of hall-churches erected in Leiria, Portalegre and Miranda do Douro in the 1550s, erected with King Johns support. It supplanted Manueline as the favoured architectural style in Portugal. Miguel de Arruda played an important role in the affirmation of this style.

It is a well proportioned architectural style that employs golden proportions, classical geometry and the golden rectangle; shapes are rectangular, compact and orthogonal. Straight lines are used to define almost everything and decoration is avoided, making buildings squat, fortified, low and clean. It is a typically Portuguese architectural expression, born from the attempt to preserve national identity, in a period of political, economic and social crisis.

== Architecture ==
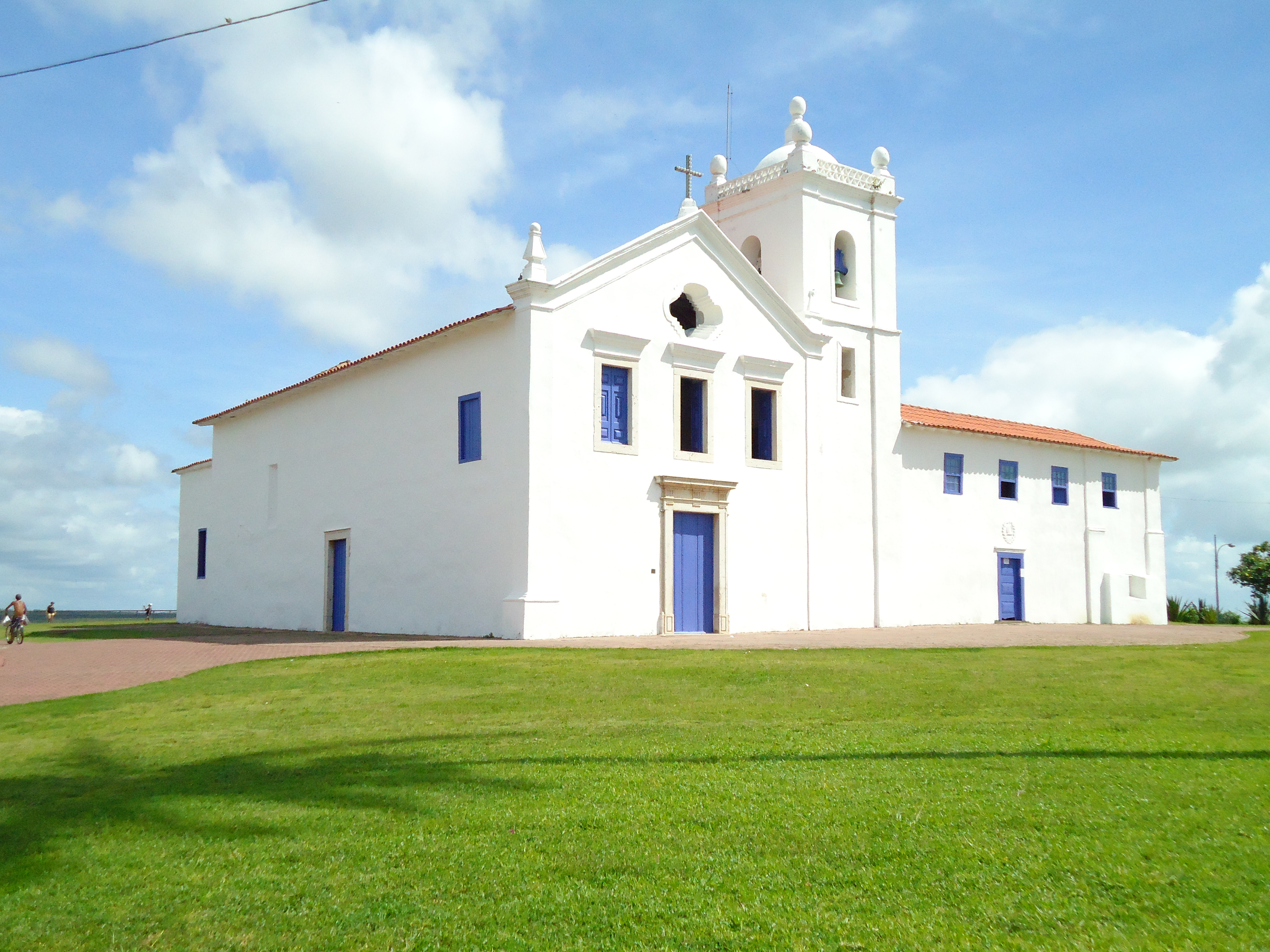
Church in Nova Almeida, Brazil

It is a very practical type of design, allowing for construction across the Portuguese Empire with minor adaptations, ready to receive decoration when deemed convenient or when economic resources were available. It was very successful because it allowed transformation through the application of gilded carving, paint, tiles, etc. The same applied to exteriors. They allowed later application of decoration or simply to build a similar building, adapting the decoration to the taste of the time and place. Practical and economical, it was born from the need to develop a style of architecture that was possible to replicate from Portugal to India via Brazil, easily built and economic. To understand it in its entirety, it is essential to bear in mind its functional character and the space of the Portuguese empire. An elegant typology developed, allowing the fragile balance between the Portuguese implantation and the local decorative models. The result was ingenious, as this architecture remained in use for more than a century and as it was very practical, easily allowing adaptation through decoration, it conditioned the development of the Baroque in the territories controlled by Portugal.

Churches are basilical buildings with two bell towers, with a single nave, deep chancel, side aisles transformed into interconnected chapels with small communication doors, interior without decoration and exterior with very simple portal windows.

== Gallery ==
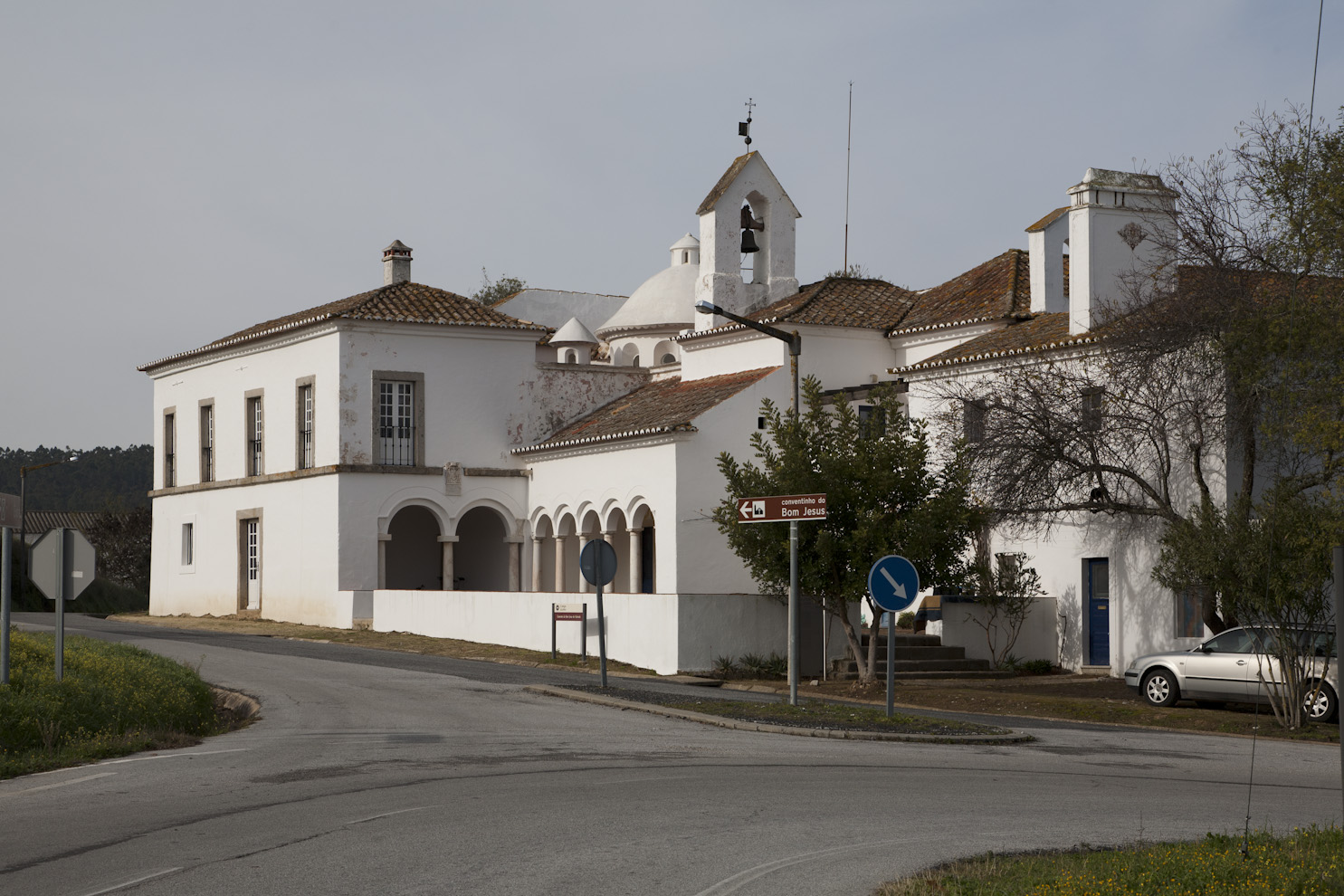
Bom Jesus monastery in Valverde, projected by Miguel de Arruda.

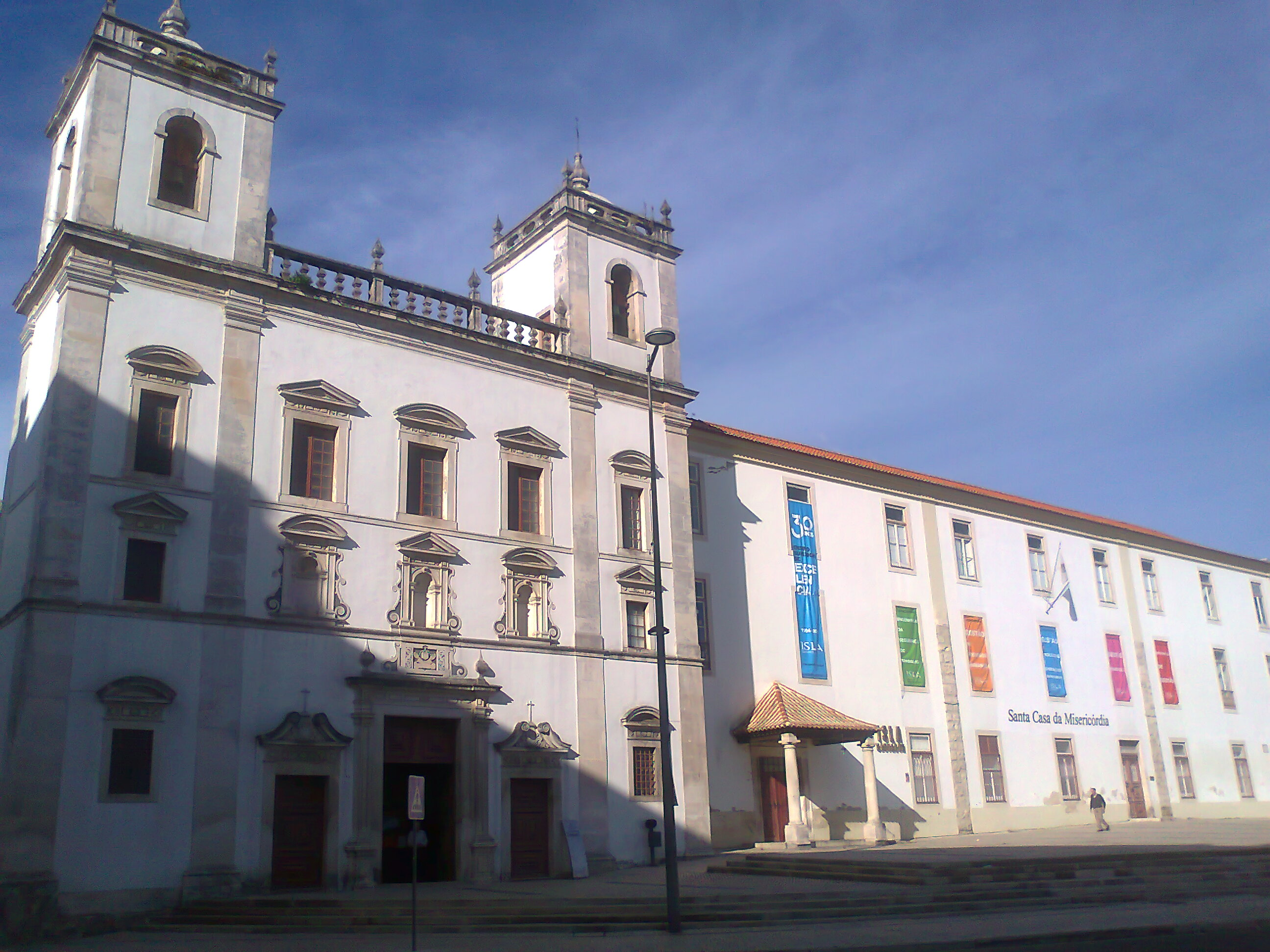
Hospital and church of the Misericórdia (charity) of Santarém.

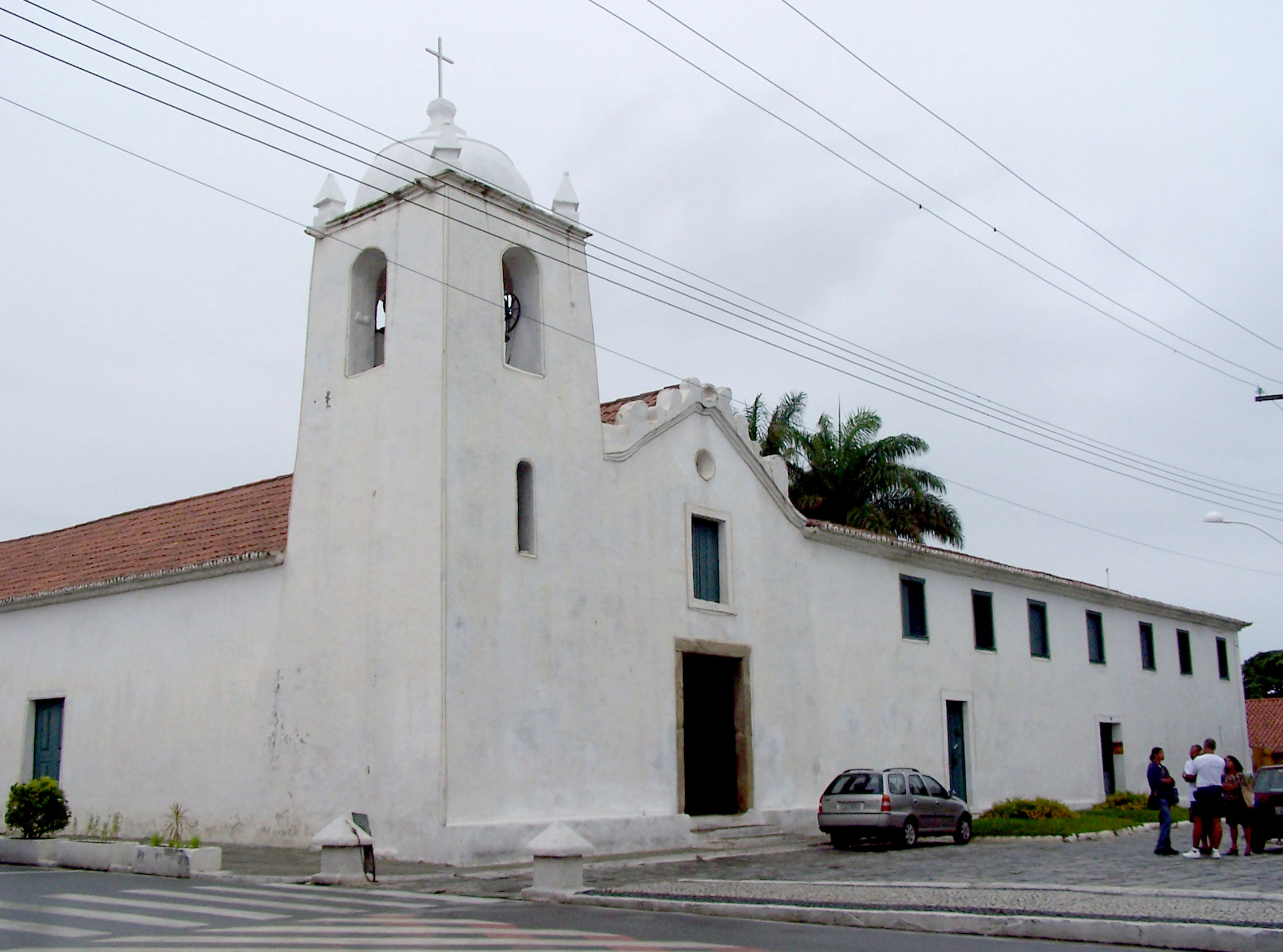
Jesuit church in São Pedro da Aldeia, Brazil.

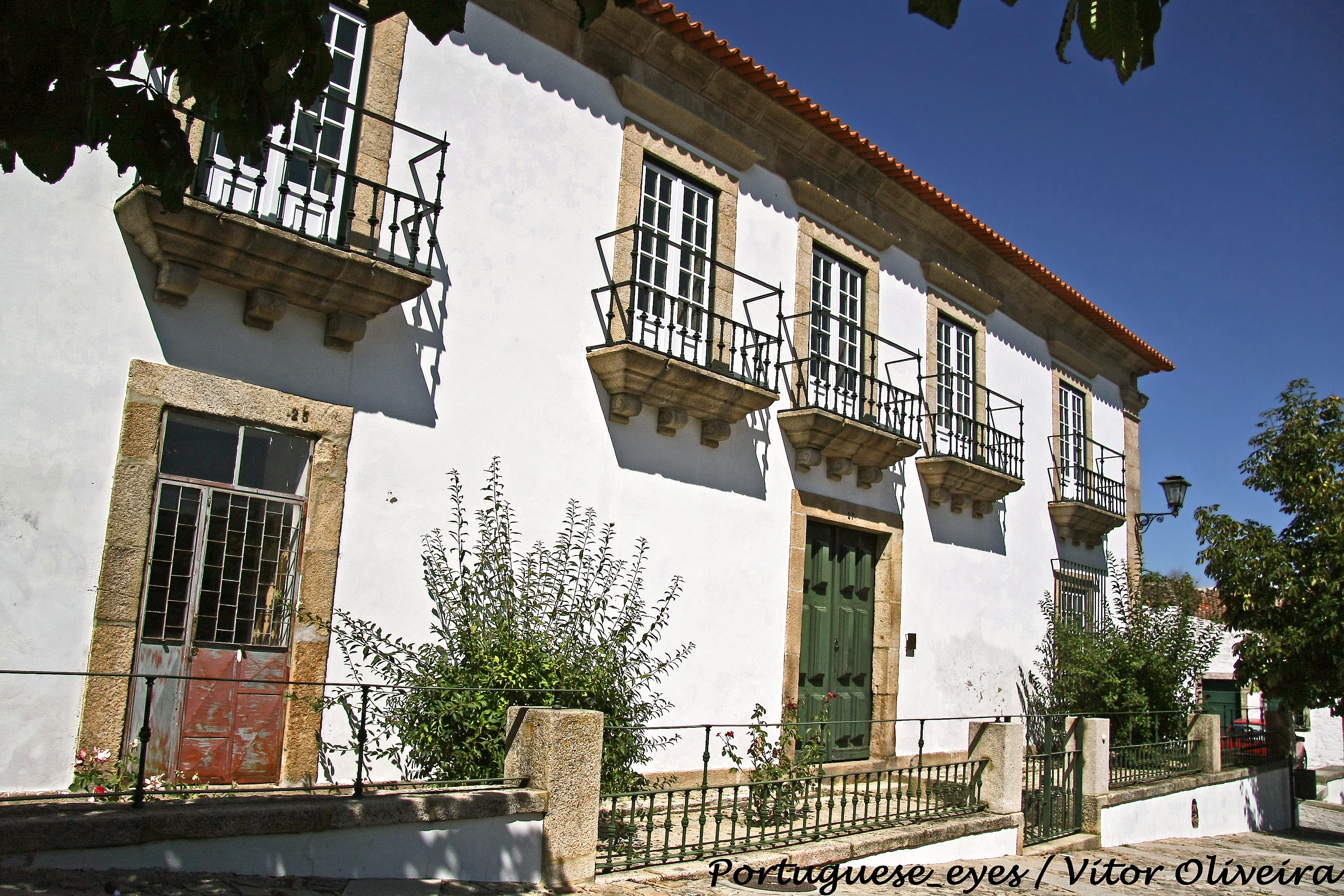
Manor of the Correia Alves family.

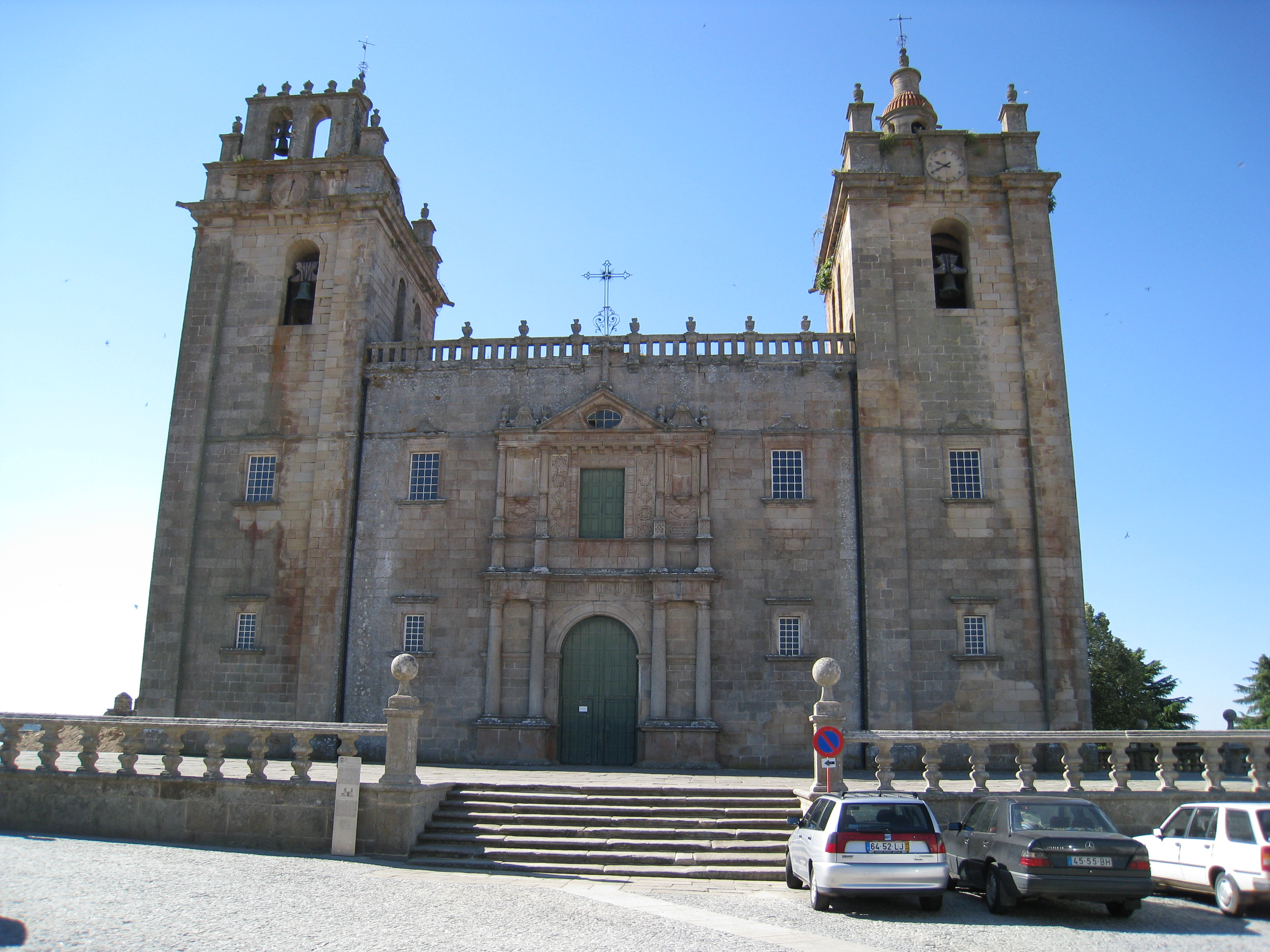
Cathedral of Miranda do Douro

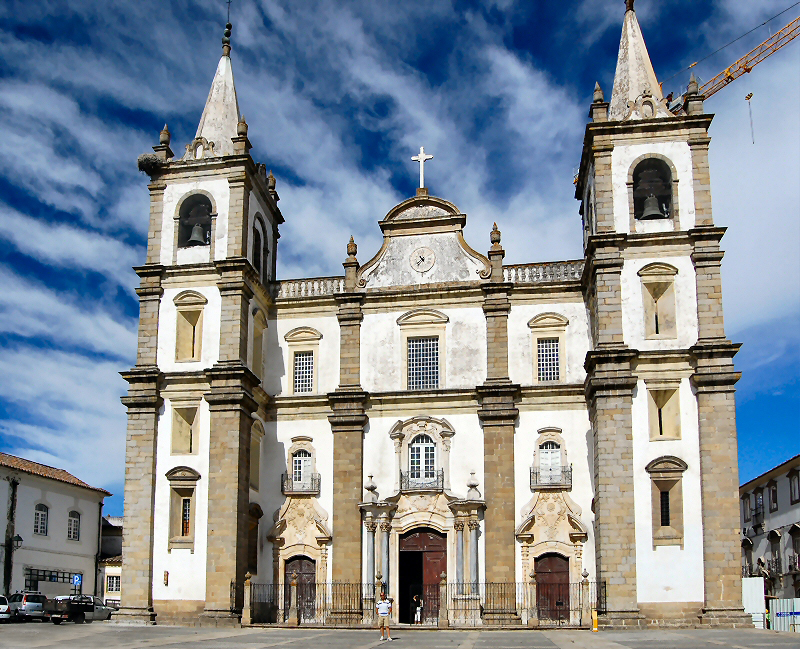
Portalegre Cathedral

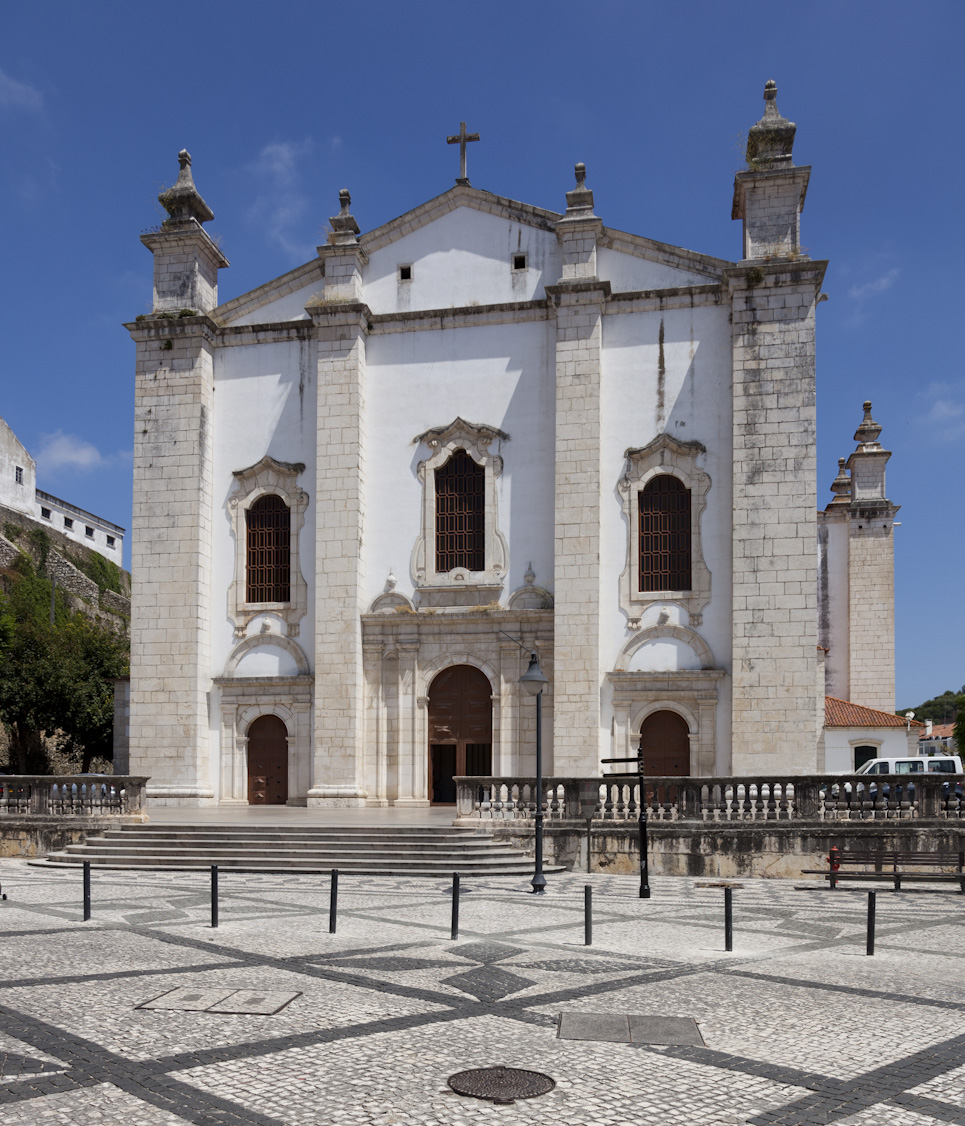
Leiria Cathedral

== See also ==
- Portuguese colonial architecture
- Architecture of Brazil
- Mannerism
