= Belém Museum of Art =

Public municipal museum in Pará, Brazil

- Museu de Arte de Belém
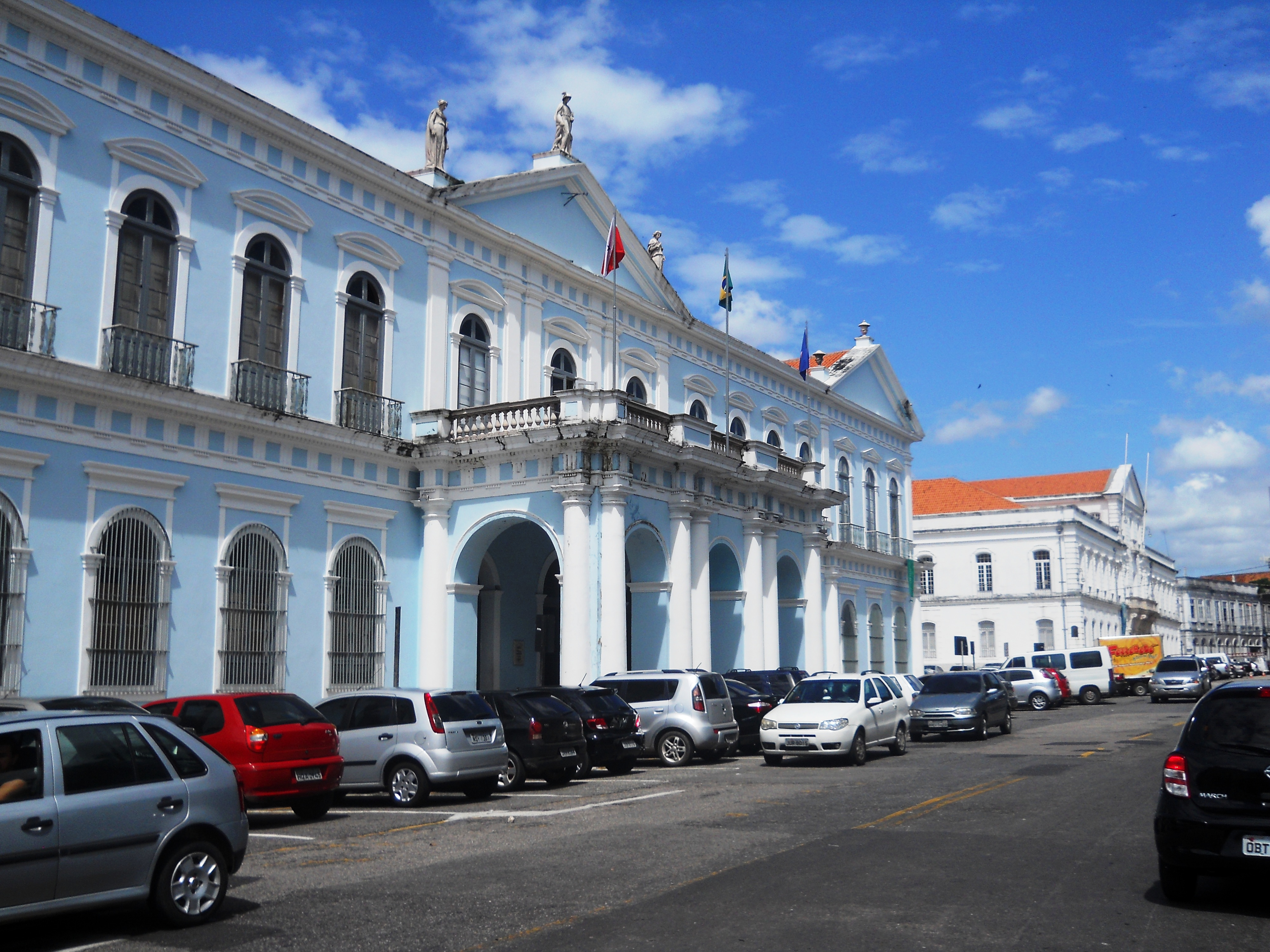
- Facade of Palacete Azul, built in the second half of the 19th century
- Established: 1991
- Location: Belém, Pará, Brazil
- Coordinates: 1°27′21″S 48°30′8″W
- Type: Art museum
- Collection size: Over 1,500 artworks
- Director: Antonina Dias Matos(2023)
- Architect: José Coelho da Gama e Abreu
- Website: mabe.belem.pa.gov.br

The Belém Museum of Art (MABE) is a public municipal museum located in the city of Belém, capital of the state of Pará, Brazil. Founded in 1991, it is subordinated to the Cultural Foundation of the Municipality of Belém (FUMBEL). Its headquarters is the Antônio Lemos Palace, a neoclassical style building erected in the second half of the 19th century to be the headquarters of the Municipal Government, listed as heritage by the public authorities at the federal, state, and municipal levels.

The collection, of over 1,500 artworks, is composed of paintings, sculptures, drawings, engravings, photographs, and examples of applied arts (furniture and porcelain), from Brazil and abroad, produced between the 18th and 20th centuries. It has a library specialized in visual arts (approximately one thousand volumes), an auditorium, three permanent exhibition rooms, and two rooms for temporary exhibitions. The MABE maintains two other exhibition spaces in the city, the Municipal Art Gallery and the Museum of Popular Art, the latter located in the district of Icoaraci.

== History ==
From the 1970s decade on, thanks to the expansion of modern means of communication and the breaking of physical isolation from other regions of the Brazilian territory through the construction of the Belém-Brasília highway, the city of Belém began to have greater access to the flow of information and the promotion of events, integrating itself more fully into the Brazilian art scene. Thus, artists from Pará had easier access to events that were previously restricted, especially in the Rio-São Paulo axis, and became part, for example, of the exhibitions promoted by the São Paulo Art Biennial Foundation and the National Salons of Fine Arts organized by the National Arts Foundation (Fundação Nacional de Artes – Funarte). This trend intensifies in the 1980s, marked by pro-redemocratization movements, responsible for bringing together a considerable part of the artistic and intellectual classes. Several cultural organizations arise, theatrical groups proliferate in the city, and in 1982 the Arte Pará Salon is created, which becomes an important milestone in the diffusion of local arts.

It is in this context that the Belém Municipal Pinacoteca was created in 1983, with the function of cataloging, preserving, and disseminating the art collection belonging to the municipal government, composed of works acquired since the early 20th century, on the occasion of academic exhibitions held in the capital. In 1986, the Belém City Museum was created, again through the City Hall's initiative, from the collection of the Municipal Pinacoteca. Three years later, the Cultural Foundation of the Municipality of Belém (FUMBEL) was established, the agency responsible for the promotion, dissemination of art and also for the maintenance of the historical, artistic and cultural heritage of the city. The foundation then starts to manage the municipality's two museum spaces.

In 1991, still as a result of this process of organization and consolidation of the municipality's cultural equipment network, the Belém Museum of Art is created during the administration of Manoel Augusto da Costa Rezende, as a department of FUMBEL. In 1994, after the renovation work in Antônio Lemos Palace, the City Hall's headquarters, the new museum was transferred to this building, where it is located until today. On the occasion of its reinauguration, its catalogue was expanded with collections from the Municipal Pinacoteca and the City Museum. The museum is responsible for managing two other museum spaces in the city of Belém: the Municipal Art Gallery and the Museum of Popular Art, located in the district of Icoaraci.

The Belém Museum of Art aims to preserve, restore, expand, research and publicize its heritage and foster various forms of artistic manifestations, as well as provide services to the student community, mainly in the field of art-education. Besides the permanent exhibitions, the institution organizes and hosts temporary and itinerant exhibitions, maintains guided tours for groups of students from public and private schools, artistic awareness workshops, events complementary to the thematic exhibitions, and lectures for organized groups from civil society. Among the permanent projects, Pontearte stands out, created in 2008 in partnership with Cidade Velha Cidade Viva association (CiVViva), aiming to develop activities to enhance the cultural heritage and stimulate artistic production with underprivileged children from Beco do Carmo.

== Facilities ==
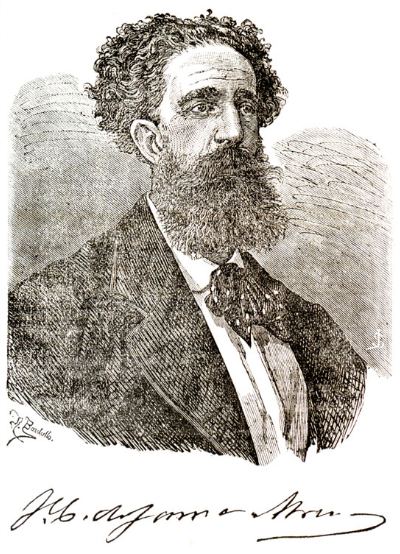
José Coelho da Gama e Abreu. 1875 print.

The Belém Museum of Art is housed in the Antônio Lemos Palace, which is also home to the municipal government's headquarters. The museum occupies seven exhibition rooms on the upper floor and two rooms on the first floor of the building, totaling 1,500 square meters. It is equipped with a restoration laboratory, technical reserve, auditorium, cinema room, and library.

The Antônio Lemos Palace, also known as "Palacete Azul", was designed by José Coelho da Gama e Abreu and built in the second half of the 19th century to house the Municipal Stewardship, thus integrating a select group of 1800's Brazilian buildings that still maintain their original public functions. It is located in Cidade Velha neighborhood, the historic center of the capital of Pará, between Felipe Patroni and D. Pedro II squares. Its construction began in 1860 and was completed in 1885. It predominantly follows the late neoclassical style, also known in Brazil as "Empire style". In addition to the City Hall, it has already housed the Court of Appeals, the Board of Trade, the municipal Council, and the Chamber of Deputies. It was listed as heritage by the National Service of Historic and Artistic Heritage (now IPHAN) in 1942 and, subsequently, by similar state and municipal agencies and institutes.

== Collection ==
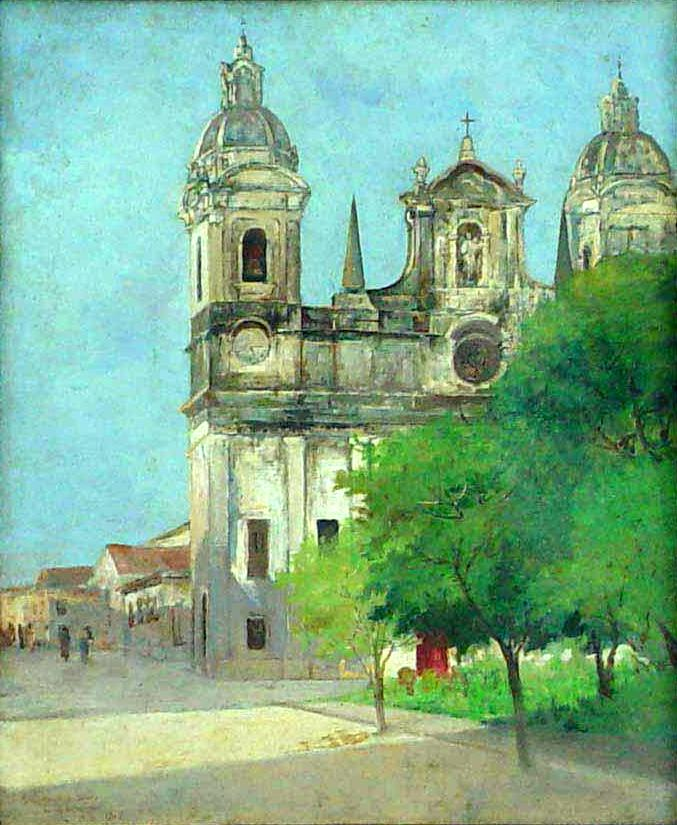
Antônio Parreiras. The Cathedral of Belém, 1905.

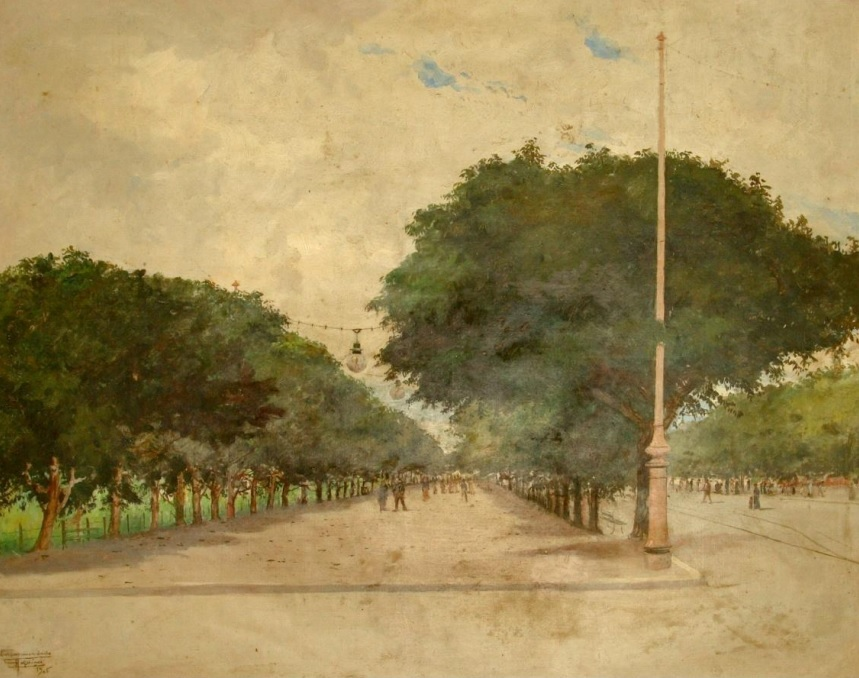
Antônio Parreiras. Largo da Pólvora Sidewalk, 1905.

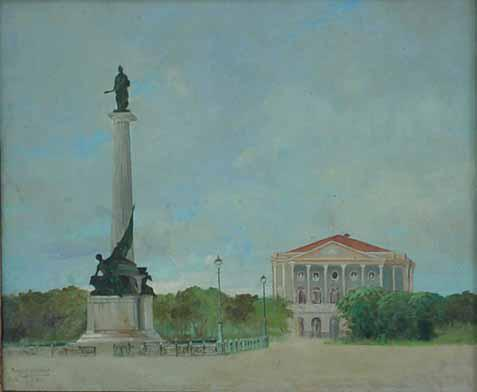
Antônio Parreiras. Republic Square, 1905.

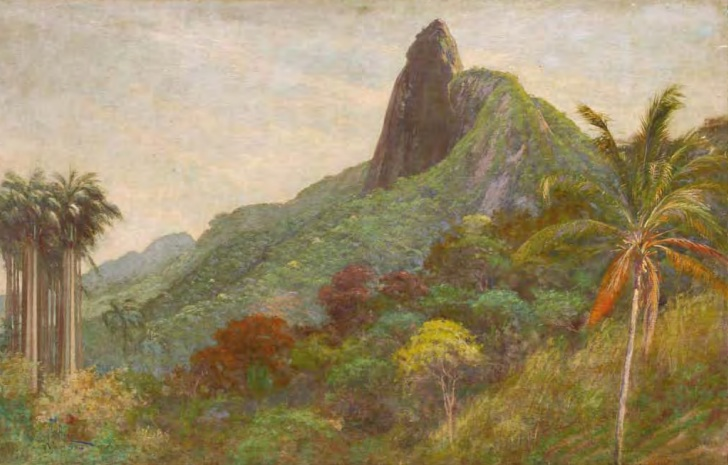
Aurélio de Figueiredo. Corcovado.

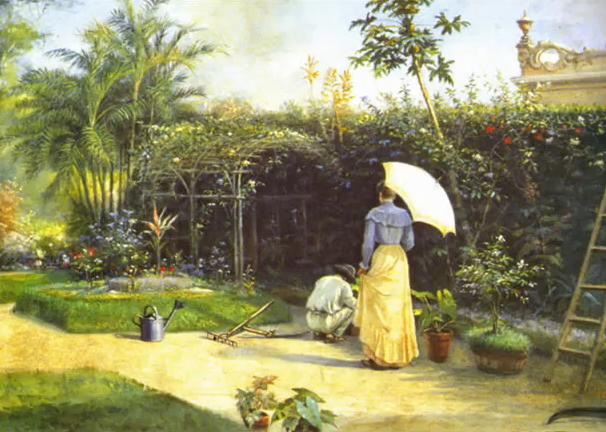
Benedito Calixto. Garden Retreat I, 1906.

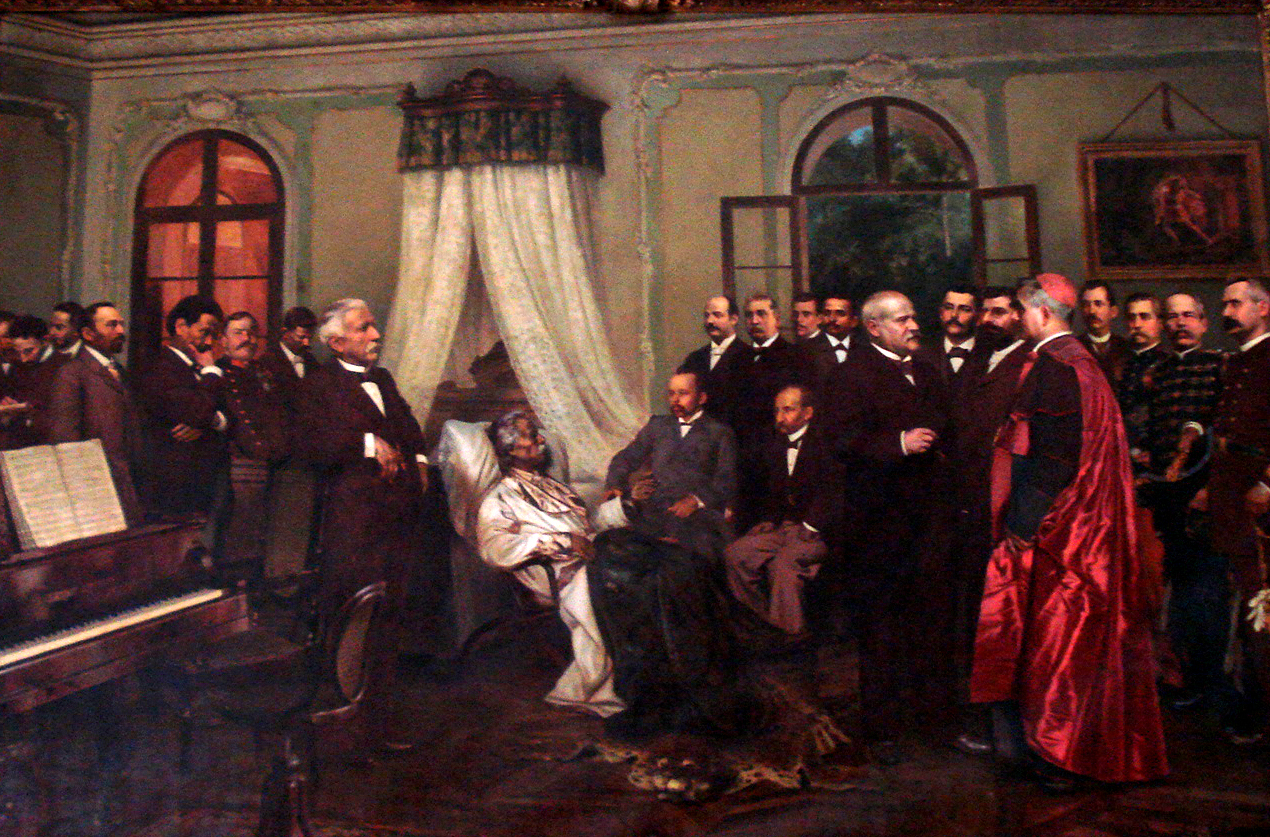
Domenico De Angelis and Giovanni Capranesi. Carlos Gomes Last Days, 1899.

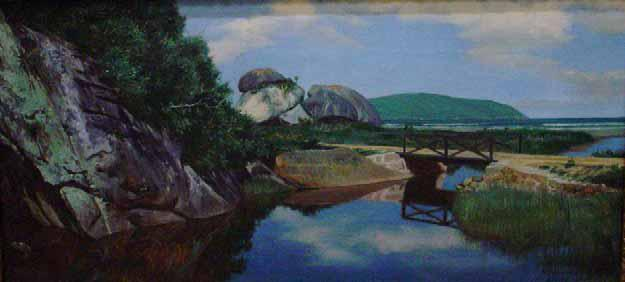
Fernandes Machado. Nice Surroundings, 1906.

The Belém Museum of Art has a collection of more than 1,500 works, including paintings, drawings, engravings, sculptures, photographs and decorative objects produced in Brazil and Europe between the 18th and 20th centuries. The segments referring to works produced in the context of the rubber boom period and to Pará iconography, depicting scenes of Belém, its inhabitants, and the Amazon region, are particularly rich.

In the collection of paintings, a set of eleven canvases depicting urban landscapes of Belém executed by Antônio Parreiras, one of the many Brazilian artists attracted by the prosperity of the capitals of the Northern region during the rubber cycle, stands out. Also in the context of nineteenth-century academic art and early twentieth-century proto-modernism, authors such as Theodoro Braga and Benedito Calixto stand out.

== See also ==
- Belém
- National Institute of Historic and Artistic Heritage (IPHAN)
- List of National Historic Heritage sites of Brazil
- Benedito Calixto
- Antônio Parreiras
- Pará State Museum

== Bibliography ==
- Arraes, Rosa Maria Lourenço (2006). Paisagens de Belém: história, natureza e pintura na obra de Antônio Parreiras, 1895–1909 (Thesis) (in Portuguese). Universidade Federal do Pará.
- Lourenço, Maria Cecília França (2000). Guia de museus brasileiros (in Portuguese). São Paulo, SP, Brasil: Universidade de São Paulo. Comissão de Patrimônio Cultural. ISBN 85-314-0572-6. OCLC 47727106.
- Meira, Maria Angélica Almeida de (2008). A arte do fazer: o artista Ruy Meira e as artes plásticas no Pará dos anos 1940 a 1980 (Thesis). Fundação Getúlio Vargas.
