= Cidade Velha (Belém) =

Historic district in Belém, Pará, Brazil

"Old Town" Cidade Velha
- Historic district
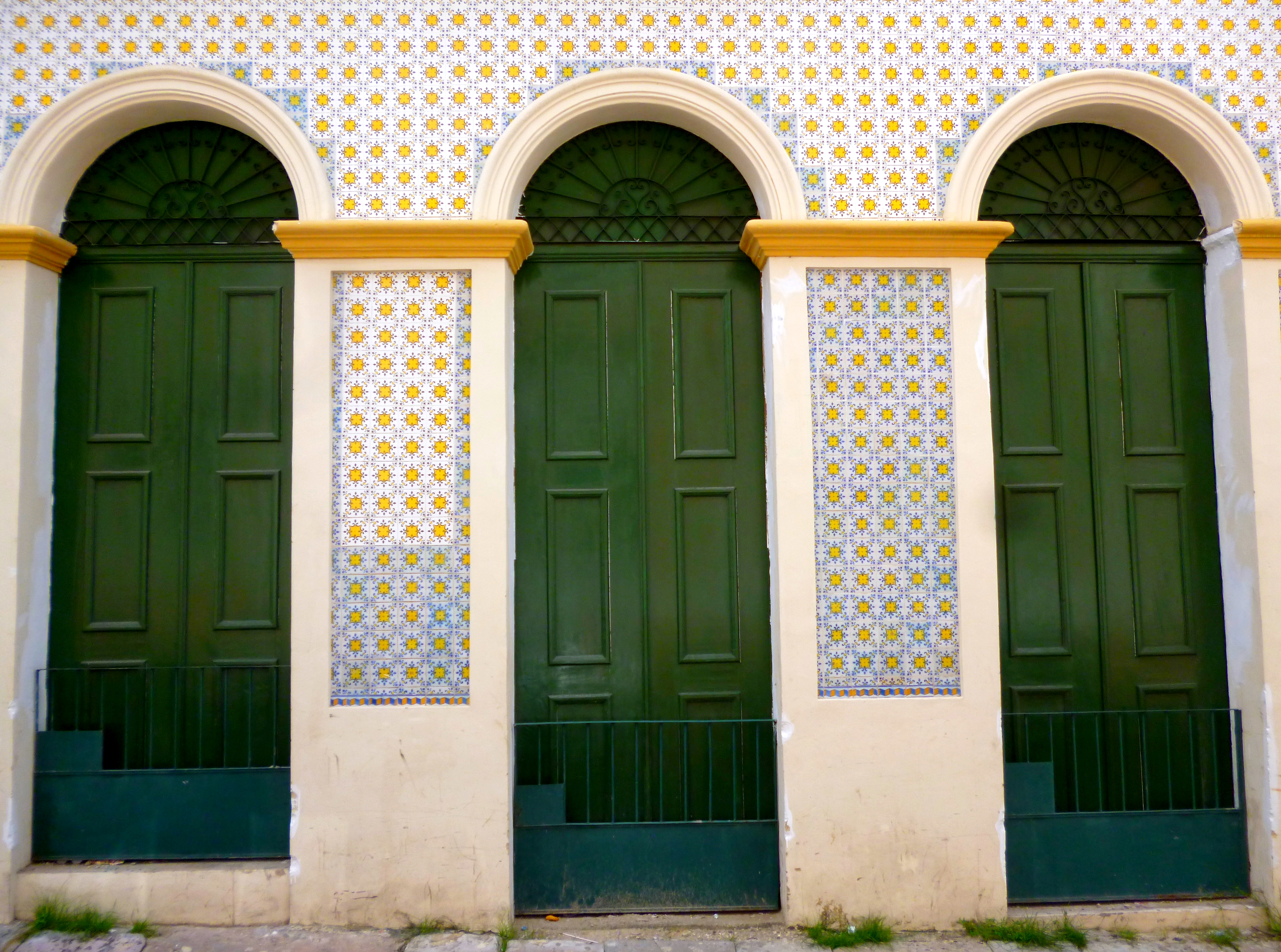
- Portuguese-style houses and colorful tiles are the backdrop for one of Belém's most historic and important neighborhoods: the Cidade Velha

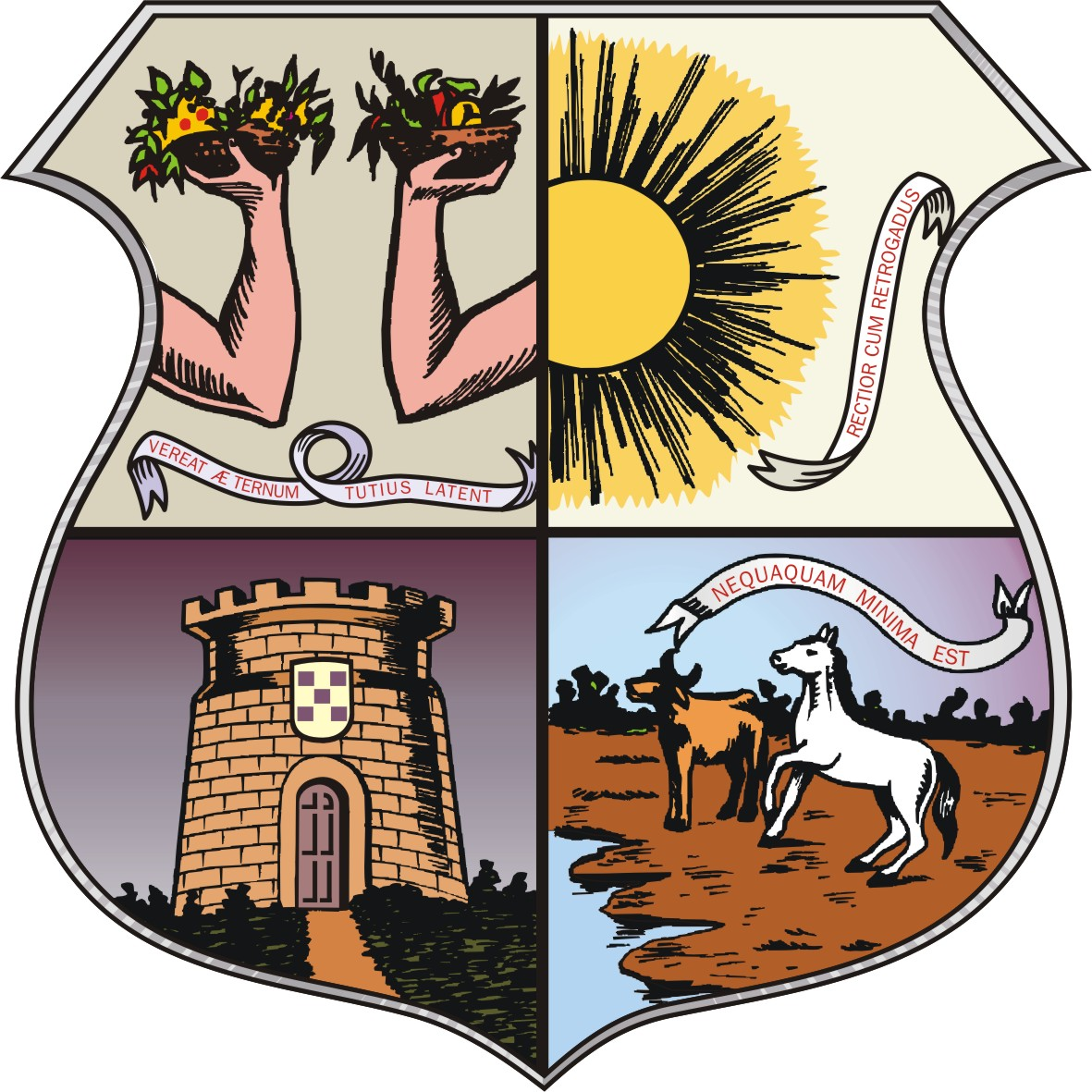
- Coat of arms
- Interactive map of "Old Town"
- Coordinates: 1°27′18″S 48°30′16″W
- Country: Brazil
- State: Pará
- City: Belém

Area
  - Total: 80.8 ha (200 acres)

Population (2010)
  - Total: 12.128
  - Density: 8.788/km^{2} (22.76/sq mi)

Cidade Velha, initially called Mairi, Cidade or Sé neighborhood, is a historic area of the capital of Pará, Belém, founded in the 1620s. It is the first and oldest neighborhood in the city, originated from the Portuguese colonial settlement Feliz Lusitânia and the construction of the wooden fortress Forte do Presépio, at the mouth of the Piry creek, by Portuguese Captain-Mor Francisco Caldeira Castelo Branco, on January 12, 1616. He had the goal of occupying the Conquista do Pará (now Pará State) in the then Captaincy of Maranhão, ensuring the dominance of the region and the drogas do sertão (spices of the region).

This area is the "historic center" of Belém, which houses the architectural complex Feliz Lusitânia that grew along the banks of the Guamá River since the city's foundation. Nowadays it has countless buildings of colonial architecture, and many old buildings that are listed as heritage by IPHAN (Instituto do Patrimônio Histórico e Artístico Nacional). With the wealth derived from the Rubber Cycle (1800/1900), European luxury was brought to Belém, present until today in the façades and structures of this area. They are a link between the origin of Belém's population and the present day.

Its streets have names of cities or personalities (Portuguese and Brazilian), such as Avenida Portugal, Rua de Aveiro, Cidade Irmã, Rua de Óbidos, Rua de Breves, Rua Doutor Assis, Rua Doutor Malcher, Rua Siqueira Mendes, Avenida Almirante Tamandaré, Rua Ângelo Custódio, Rua Félix Roque, Rua Padre Champagnat, Boulevard Castilhos França.

== History ==
=== European colonization (Feliz Lusitânia) ===
The region where Belém is located was initially the indigenous region of Mairi, home to the Tupinambá and Pacajá (under the command of cacique Guaimiaba), a trading post for the Marajoara cacique, where in 1580, the Portuguese arrived with the military expedition Feliz Lusitânia, commanded by Captain Francisco Caldeira Castelo Branco and established a colonial nucleus (at the behest of the King of the Iberian Union and of the Philippine Dynasty, Manuel I). They aimed to occupy the Conquista do Pará, also called the Empire of the Amazonas (1615-1621, located in the then Captaincy of Maranhão), and ensure dominance in eastern Amazon and of spices of the region, which foreigners disputed. Thus, they created on January 12, 1616, at the mouth of the Piry creek, the Portuguese colonial settlement (villa) Feliz Lusitânia along with a fort called Forte do Presépio, that contained the chapel of the patron saint Our Lady Santa Maria de Belém (now the Metropolitan Cathedral).

=== Battles against foreigners and natives ===
In the settlement began a period of battles against foreigners (Dutch, English, French) to secure dominance of the region and against the indigenous peoples, in a process of colonization and enslavement trying to implement an economic model based on the exploitation of indigenous labor and primary resources.

Many Indian revolts occurred until July 1620, when Bento Maciel Parente, sergeant major of the Cabo Norte Captaincy, attacked the village of the Tapajó Indians, decimating them and dominating the Conquista do Pará. With the victory, Conquista do Pará was elevated to the category of Captaincy and the colonial settlement was elevated to the category of municipality under the name "Santa Maria de Belém do Pará" or "Nossa Senhora de Belém do Grão Pará" (later "Santa Maria de Belém do Grão Pará", until the current Belém) when the first streets of the region were built, originating the first neighborhood baptized "Cidade" (current Cidade Velha neighborhood).

=== Streets ===
==== First streets ====
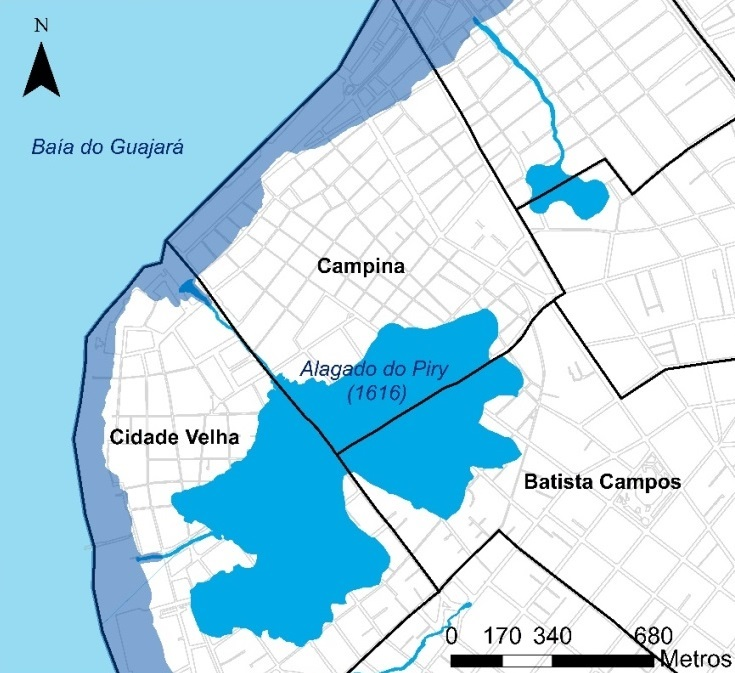
At the beginning, Belém was an island that until the 1620s was separated from the mainland by the Piry Igarapé.

Initially, the settlement of Feliz Lusitânia was an island, as it was surrounded by the Piry creek and its tributaries. The location was landfilled in 1803.

- The first street, created in the 1620s, began at the Presépio Fort and was named Rua do Norte or Ladeira do Castelo, now called Rua Siqueira Mendes, in honor of the president of the province at the time of 1868, the canon and politician Manuel José de Siqueira Mendes.
- The second street was called Espirito Santos, being renamed to Rua Doutor Assis in honor of the Pará journalist and physician Joaquim José de Assis (founder of the newspaper A Província do Pará).
- The third street was called Rua dos Cavaleiros, being renamed to Rua Doutor Malcher in honor of the physician and former governor of the capital José da Gama Malcher.
- The fourth street created was called Rua São João, renamed to João Diogo Street in honor of the politician João Diogo Clemente.

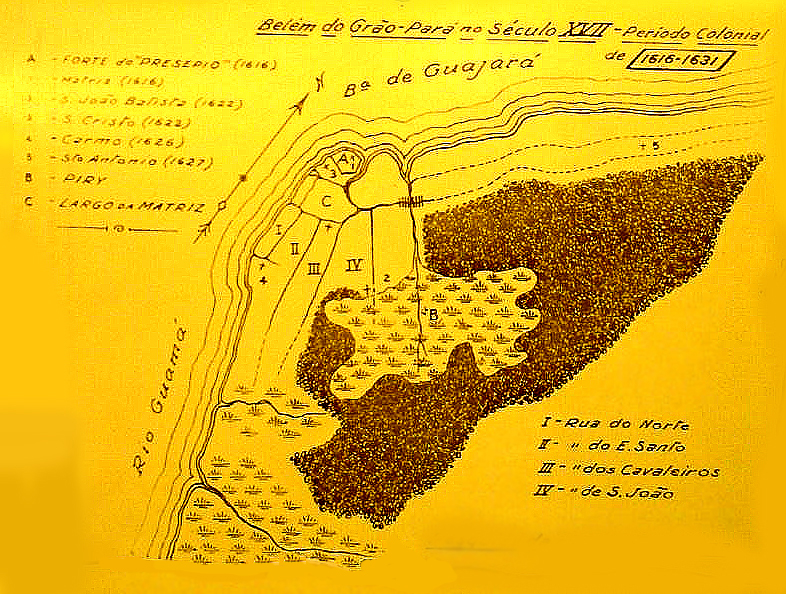
First streets of the colonial settlement Feliz Lusitânia (in the 1630s). Bairro (Neighborhood) Cidade: I. rua do Norte; II. rua do Espirito santo; III. rua dos Cavaleiros; IV. rua de São João; 5. estrada de Santo Antonio.

==== Main streets ====
List of the main streets and avenues in the neighborhood:

- Avenida Almirante Tamandaré.
- Rua do Aveiro, Cidade Irmã.
- Rua Ângelo Custódio (Rua Longa), built in the 1600s in honor of the lawyer and former governor of the then Pará Province, Ângelo Custódio Corrêa.
- Rua de Breves.
- Rua Doutor Assis.
- Rua Doutor Malcher.
- Rua Félix Rocque (Rua das Rosas, Rua da Residência, Rua da Vigia).
- Rua Joaquim Távora (caminho do Atalaia, Rua Demétrio Ribeiro).
- Rua Gurupá (travessa da Barroca).
- Rua Rodrigues dos Santos, homage to the physician and former capital intendant Manoel Waldomiro Rodrigues dos Santos (Rua Alfama, Rua Santarém).
- Rua de Óbidos.
- Rua Padre Champagnat (Rua da Calçada do Colégio, Rua Antonio Raiol), homage to Father Marcelino José Bento Champagnat.
- Rua Siqueira Mendes.
- Travessa Monte Alegre.

== Historic center ==
In 2012, IPHAN (the Institute of National Historical and Artistic Heritage) recognized as a historical heritage the "architectural, urbanistic, and landscape ensemble of the Cidade Velha and Campina neighborhoods," which together form the "historic center of Belém," gathering about 2,800 protected buildings, among which are palaces and townhouses combined with commercial houses on the first floor, and that add up to a population of approximately 18.284 residents.

== Tourist attractions ==
=== Historic Buildings ===
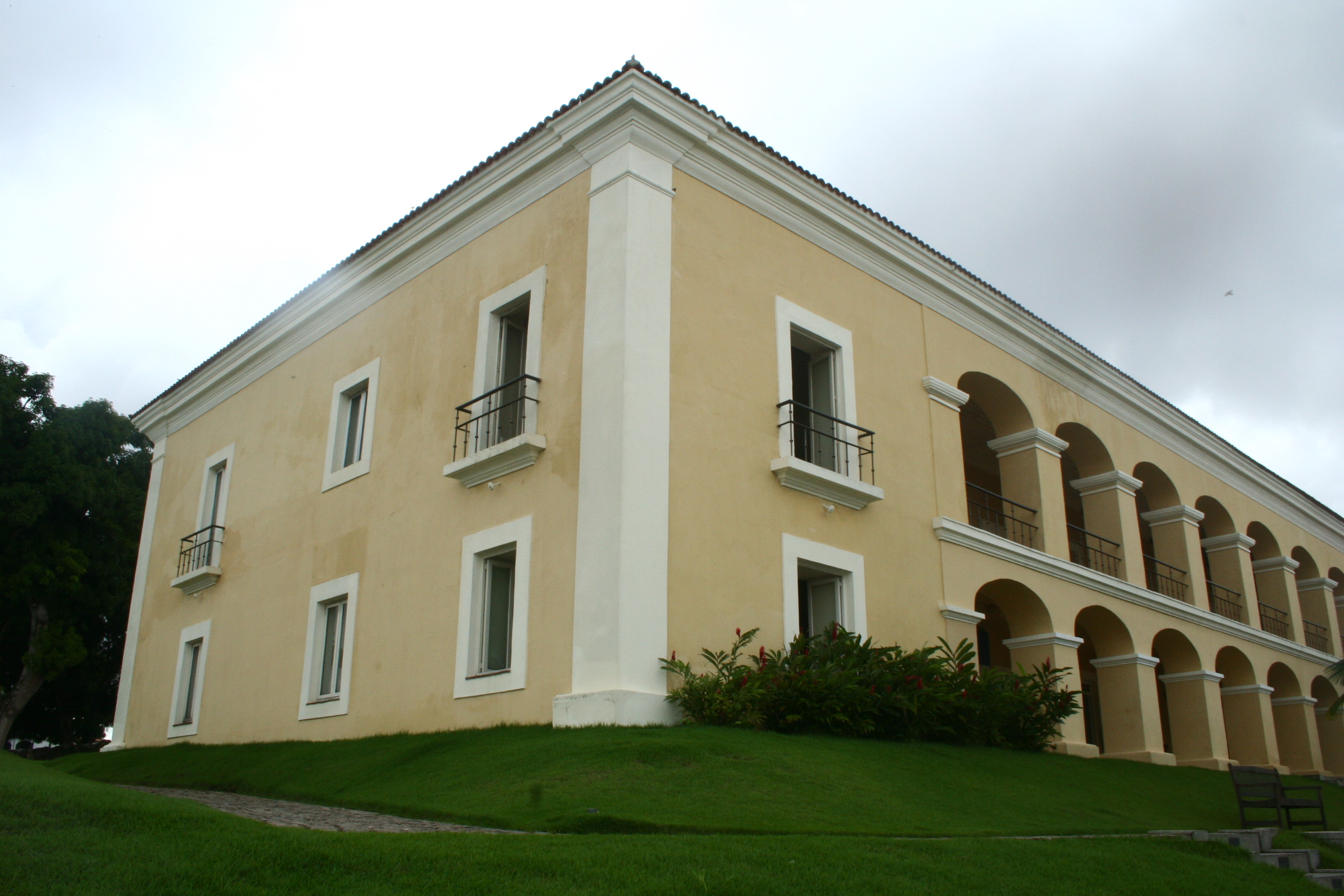
Onze Janelas Palace

- Camelier Palace- Home of the Mullins-Camelier family. In the back of the house operated an important shipyard of the rubber cycle Metal Artifacts Workshop Viúva Camelier & Cia.
- Castelo Fort (Forte do Castelo) - Cradle of the city built by Castelo Branco in 1616 to protect the Amazon from Dutch and French invaders. It has a collection of Marajoara and Tapajonic ceramics from before the arrival of the Portuguese. The fort still has the original cannons.
- Antônio Lemos Palace - A sumptuous palace built in 1883. It shelters the Municipal Cabinet and the Museum of Arts of Belém which counts with a collection of almost a thousand works of art.
- Lauro Sodré Palace - Architected by the Italian Antonio Landi, it was the former headquarters of the province of Grão Pará, today housing the Museum of the State of Pará.
- Old Palace - Architectural relic in the Carmo complex, with great historical importance for Belém. The property has two floors and a belvedere.
- Palace of the Eleven Windows - An important urban landmark in Belém, built in the eighteenth century by Domingos da Costa Barcelar, a wealthy lord. In 1768, it was converted into a military hospital by the government of Grão-Pará. The house had military functions until 2001 when it was bought by the state government to serve as a tourist attraction in the capital.
- Pinho Mansion - Occupied by the family of Commander José de Pinho, it was completed in 1897, adopting a Portuguese architecture and tiles. The lack of resources to maintain the palace led the family to sell the property in 1978, today well preserved and open to the public for visits and cultural activities.
- Solar Barão de Guajará (Baron of Guajará Manor House) - A colonial-style building, entirely tiled, completed in 1873, currently housing the Pará Geography Institute.
- Solar da Beira - a neoclassical building that integrates the Ver-o-Peso Complex
- Casa Rosada - Built in 1760, the house is located at Rua Siqueira Mendes. Its owner was the engineer and captain Mateus José Simões de Carvalho, who participated in 1795 in a defense of Grão-Pará against a likely French invasion.

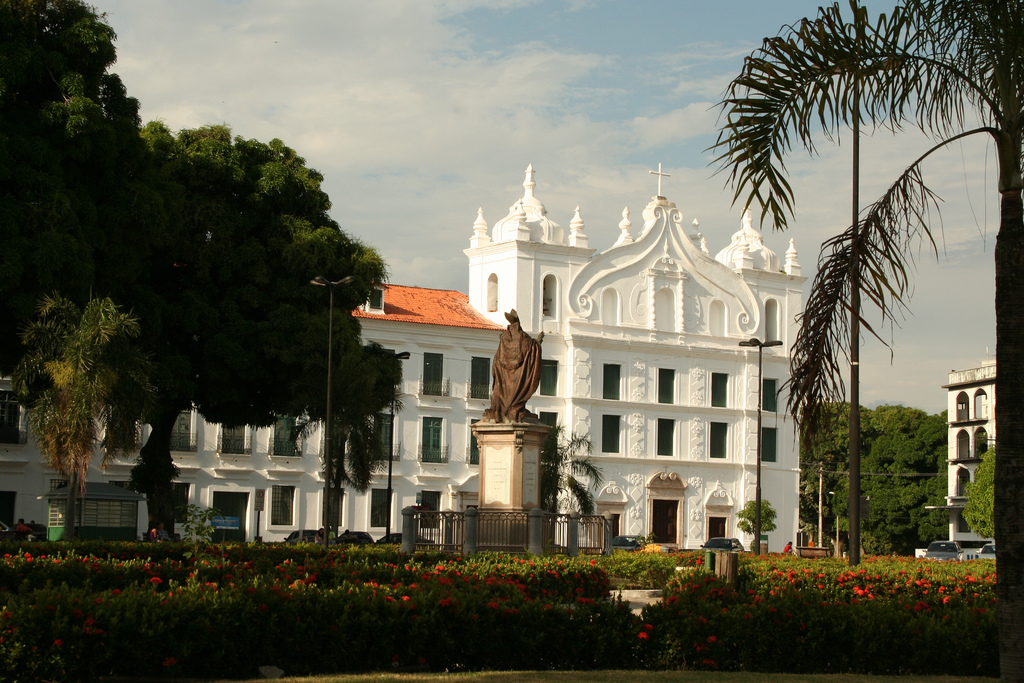
Saint Alexander Church

=== Churches ===
- Our Lady of Grace Cathedral - Completed in 1771, it was partly designed by the Italian architect Antonio José Landi. Its altar was donated by Pope Pius XI, and the sumptuous church has 28 bronze English chandeliers and multiple paintings in its ten lateral altars.
- Church of Saint Alexander - Architected in the Amazonian baroque style, the current version was concluded in 1719. Its convent is the most important Jesuit complex in Brazil, and it was recently restored to receive the Museum of Sacred Art.
- Church of Our Lady of Mount Carmel - Erected in the neoclassic and baroque styles, it is the oldest church of Belém. It was restored in the 18th century by the Italian architect Antonio Landi. It possesses works of art and a silver altar with several semiprecious stones.
- Church of Saint John the Baptist - Small octagonal-shaped church also created by Antonio Landi in 1777. It contains remarkable quadrature paintings. The decoration has four chancels and an elaborated central dome.

=== Squares and Parks ===
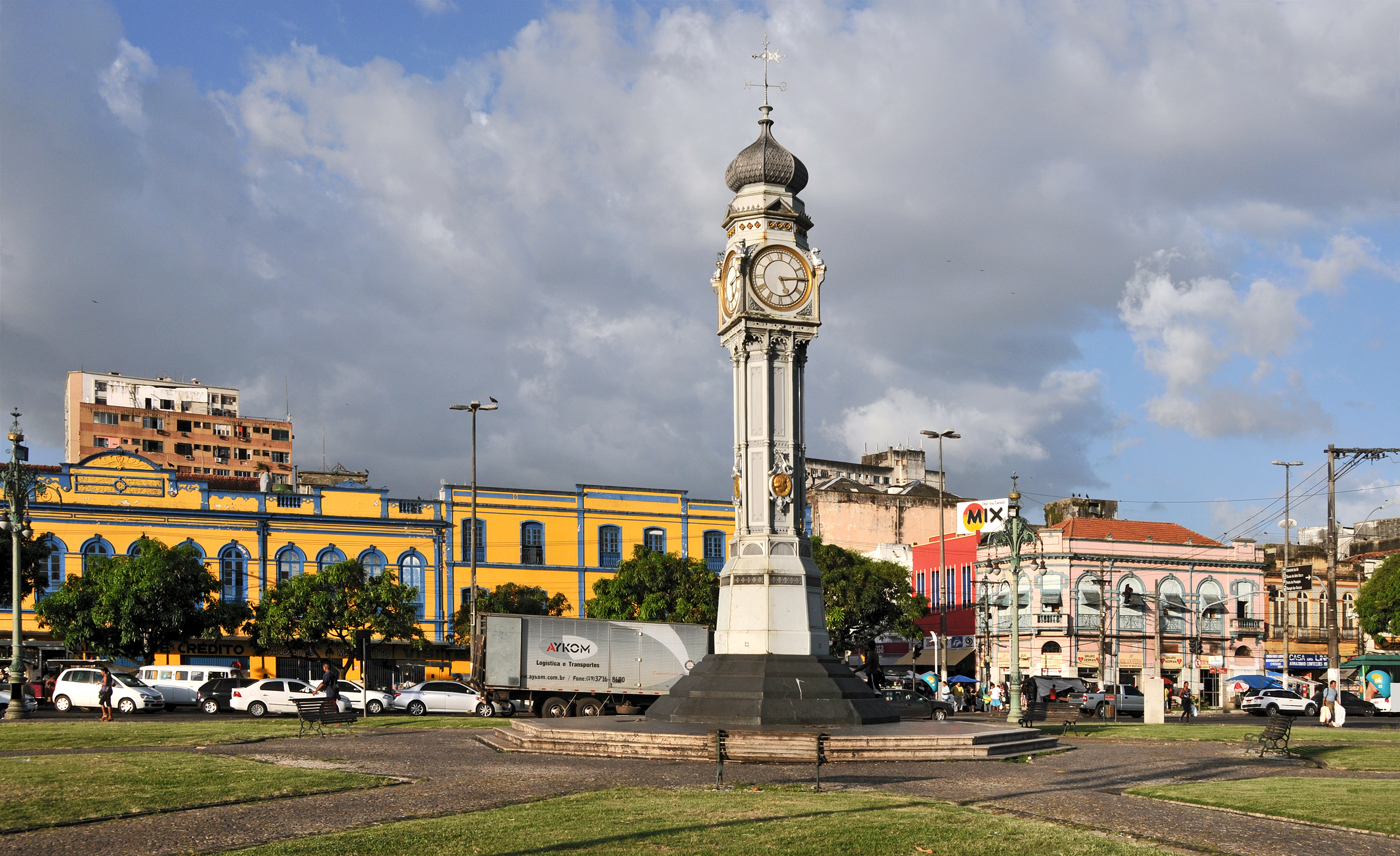
Relógio Square

- Mangal das Garças - The complex by the Guamá River has 40000 m^{2} of area. In the gardens and in the bird nursery there are scarlet ibis, herons and other birds. The park also has a butterfly garden where there are almost 800 insects. Furthermore, the complex has the old shipyard space, which brings together jewelry and crafts produced in the Jewelry Center, the tower's belvedere, with a 360º view of Belém, and the Amazonian Navigation Museum, which recounts the history of the Brazilian Navy.
- Siqueira Campos Square - Inaugurated in 1931, it is better known as the Relógio ("clock") Square, for it houses a clock of twelve meters, built in England and assembled in Belém. The square also has four light fixtures from the beginning of the 20th century.
- Dom Frei Caetano Brandão Square - Completed in 1900, also known as Largo da Sé, this place is part of the Feliz Lusitânia Complex. It is a strategic starting point for sightseeing in the historic center. The square houses a bronze monument dedicated to Bishop Caetano Brandão.
- Dom Pedro II Square - It is the oldest square in the capital, concluded in 1772. Its landscaping project has species of regional flora, a light fountain, fountains and small artificial lakes.
- Carmo Square - Place of great historical importance to Belém, where part of the ruins of the Rosário dos Homens Brancos Church can be found. Its paving is made entirely of marble and has an amphitheater in the center.
