= Port of Belém =

Port in Belém, Pará, Brazil

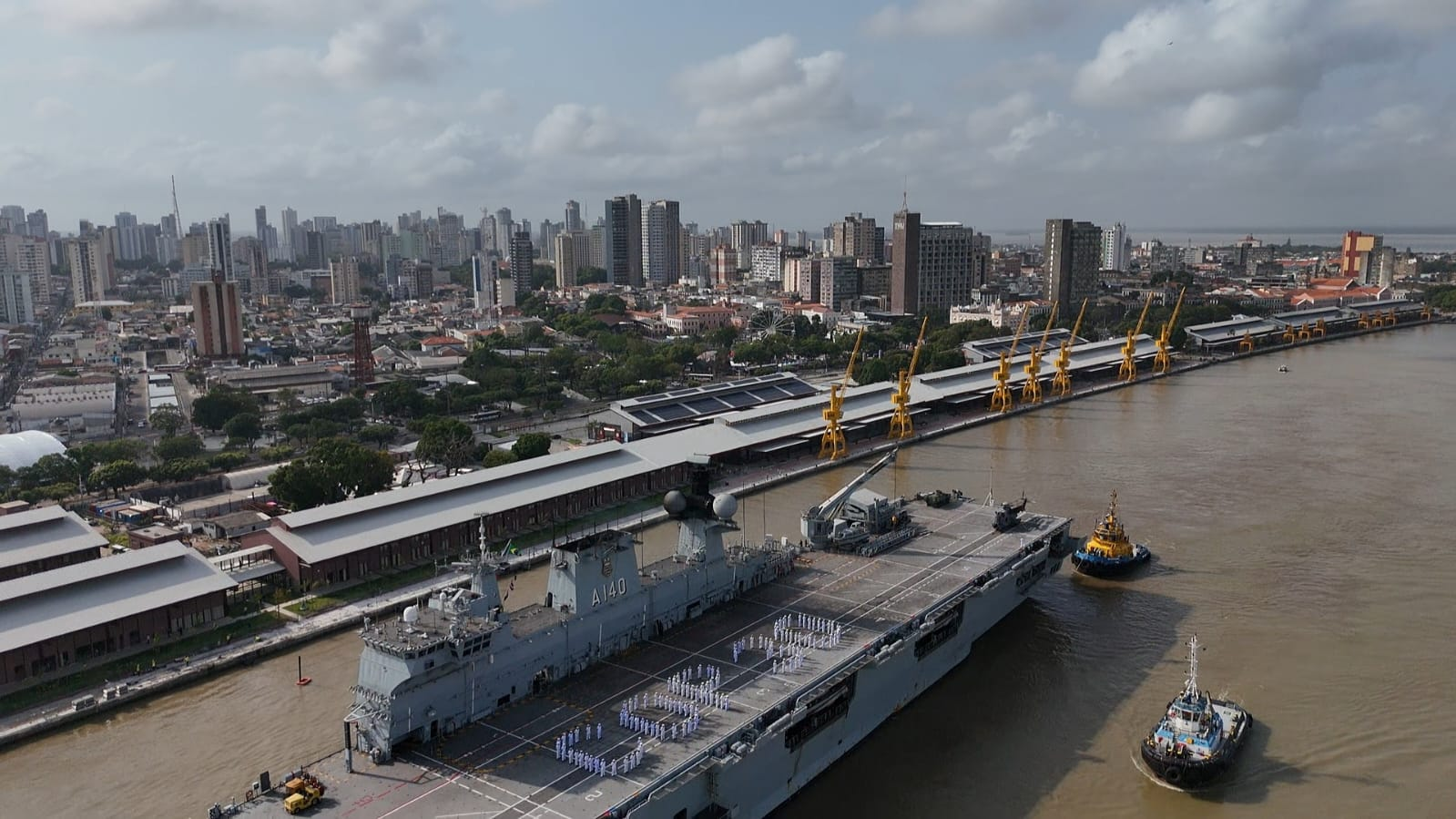
- Interactive map of Port of Belém

Location
- Location: Belém, Pará; Brazil
- Coordinates: 01°26′35″S 48°29′51″W

Details
- Opened: 1909; 117 years ago
- Operated by: Companhia Docas do Pará
- Owned by: Federal Government of Brazil
- Size: 1.718m

Statistics
- Annual cargo tonnage: 28.000 (2011)
- Passenger traffic: 479.085 (2011)

The Port of Belém was built in 1909 and is located in the neighborhood of Reduto, in the city of Belém, capital of Pará, on the right bank of Guajará Bay, about 120 km from the Atlantic Ocean. It was designed in 1897 and the first stretch inaugurated in 1909; it is currently managed by Companhia Docas do Pará. It is known for exporting chestnuts, wood, rubber, bauxite and iron ore.

In 2011, 134 ships operated in the Port of Belém; 53% of them were containerships with an average length of 170m and a draft of 7m; passenger ships accounted for 10% of the total, with an average length of 120m and an average draft of 5m, from where 500 tourists disembark per trip; the rest were cargo ships (19%) and bulk carriers (18%). The port exported 919 million dollars and imported 206 million.

== History ==
In the centuries before the Port of Belém was built, the city exploited maritime navigation through natural harbors and quays. In the 18th century, there was already a growing demand for the establishment of a port, given the city's commercial activities. In 1848, the construction of a pier was completed and over the next few decades, maritime exploration improved. In 1840, 78 vessels with 11,252 cargoes were registered in the port area; in 1880, this number increased to 292 vessels and 258,115 cargoes. In 1897, engineer Domingos Sérgio de Sabóia e Silva presented a project for a port, in which he proposed that it should be extended beyond the existing quay up to 4,300 meters, and that the Ver-o-Peso, Reduto and Souza Franco docks should be landfilled due to the unhealthy conditions. After some modifications, the federal government accepted the proposal and, between 1903 and 1905, approved laws providing funds and authorization for construction. In 1906, President Afonso Pena signed Decree No. 6.283, granting the North American businessman Percival Farquhar the operation of the port, through his company Port of Pará, which won the public tender. (Note: Under the terms of the contract, the port would be built and organized from the mouth of the Guamá River to the tip of Mosqueiro Island, divided into two sections. Port of Pará could operate the first section until 1973 and the others until 1996, when it would pass to the federal government.)

Cargo handling
Year	Tons
1911	500.066
1920	346.384
1930	482.897
1940	509.368
1950	621.303
1960	887.799
1967	867.348
2003	964.188

The contractual clauses required Farquhar to build the port in two sections: the first, from Forte do Castelo to the tip of Mosqueiro, in Marajó Bay; and the second, from there to the mouth of the Oriboca River with the Guamá River. The project for the port organization was drawn up by the company S. Pearson & Sons, which had been responsible for building the ports of Liverpool and London. Dredging of the anchorage began on November 16, 1907. The requisite works were completed, such as the long and deep dock, as well as the construction of coal and explosives depots, lighting and railway lines. However, the Ver-o-Peso Dock was not landfilled due to the popular demonstrations and its importance for local commerce. The depth of the canal was also not increased.

During the construction process, most of the unskilled workforce was composed of local citizens; the specialized ones came from London, Paris and New York, including the engineers Antonio Lavandeyra, H.C. Ripley and L. Corthell. On October 2, 1909, the first section of the Port of Belém was inaugurated, measuring 120 meters, comprising a warehouse and the dredged channel, and beginning commercial exploitation. In the following years, the other parts of the project were delivered and, in 1913, the port reached 1,860 meters. Eleven electric cranes were installed, electric lighting was provided (with 2,200 bulbs) and 6.5 kilometers of railway track were delivered.

In 1915, the Port of Pará company faced financial difficulties and was intervened by a commission in the context of a legal dispute in the United States. The end of the rubber cycle led to the Port of Belém being unable to use its full estimated load, remaining underutilized for a long time. After selling its shares on the stock exchange, Farquhar, which once controlled the transportation system in Amazon and central-southern Brazil, went bankrupt. In 1921, the Port of Pará suspended payment of the guarantees and the federal government was no longer able to provide an effective solution.

In 1940, the federal government took over management of the port through Decree-Law No. 2,142. Two autonomous administrations were created: the Amazon Navigation Service (SNAPP) and the Pará Port Administration. SNAPP was abolished in 1967, giving way to Empresa de Navegação da Amazônia S.A. (Enasa) and Companhia Docas do Pará (CDP), both mixed-capital companies. In the following decades, growing demand required the construction of terminals, which complemented the Port of Belém. The Miramar Flammables Terminal was the first, being an extension of the port and serving mainly for the transit of fuel oil. In 1985, the Vila do Conde Terminal was inaugurated in the municipality of Barbacena. Since 1970, containerized cargo and dry bulk have predominated.

== Characteristics and structure ==
The Port of Belém is located on the right bank of Guajará Bay, 120 km from the Atlantic Ocean. As it is sheltered, it is practically protected from strong winds. The Belém Port Complex includes the Outeiro, Predileta, Agropalma, Miramar, ADP Dry Port, Ocrim and Container terminals. There are 1,889 meters of dockable quay, although 420 meters have been allocated to the Port Area Revitalization Program, reducing the size to 1,469 meters. The depth varies from five to ten meters. It has twelve warehouses, eight first-line and four second-line, with areas ranging from 2000m² to 2400m².

According to Ordinance No. 510 of July 5, 2019, issued by the Ministry of Infrastructure, the "organized port area comprises the facilities and infrastructure for protection and access to the port; it is a public asset built and equipped to meet the needs of navigation, passenger handling or the handling and storage of goods, and whose traffic and port operations are under the jurisdiction of the port authority."

=== Passenger handling ===
In 2011, there were 239,835 embarkations and 232,654 disembarkations of passengers. Fourteen cruise ship calls were recorded in the same year.

=== Cargo handling ===
In 2011, the Belém Port Complex handled 3,223,323 tons of cargo, including 2,170,859 tons of liquid bulk, 674,302 tons of solid bulk and 378,162 tons of general cargo. Among the liquid bulk, 1,775,645 tons were fuels. That year, demand was expected to grow by 5.3% per year until 2030.

== Port management ==
The Port of Belém is managed by Companhia Docas do Pará (CDP), a mixed-capital company linked to the federal government. As an authority, it has jurisdiction and property rights over the port and neighboring areas belonging to it, exercising it on behalf of the state of Pará and the Union. In addition to the Port of Belém, the company manages and operates the ports of Santarém, Vila do Conde, Altamira, Itaituba, Óbidos, São Francisco and Marabá.

Companhia Docas do Pará's main management bodies are the General Shareholders' Meeting, the Board of Directors, the executive board and the President. The board of directors is made up of seven members chosen by the General Shareholders' Meeting for three-year terms, with the possibility of re-election. CDP's CEO directs, coordinates and controls the company's activities.

In 2011, the company's expenses with the Port of Belém represented the largest part of its budget. Most of this was allocated to operating expenses, totaling R$7.824 million; administrative expenses accounted for R$1.036 million.

== Cultural activities ==
=== Estação das Docas ===
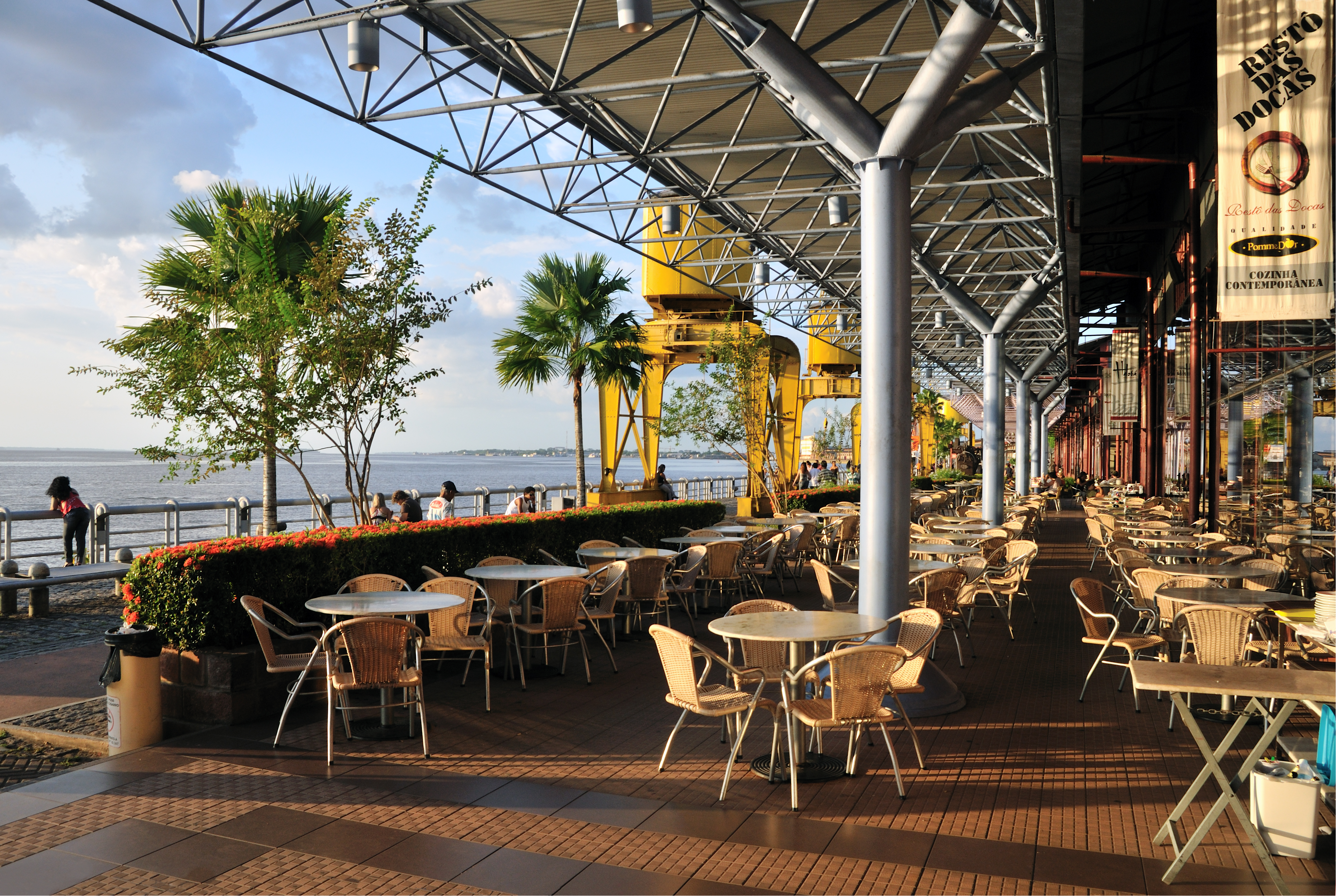
Estação das Docas

Estação das Docas is a tourist complex in the city of Belém. Formerly part of the Port of Belém, it was inaugurated as a tourist center on May 13, 2000, occupying an area that previously had high levels of crime and prostitution, and transforming it into a leisure spot. The place brings together several activities, including gastronomy, culture, fashion and events. There are 32,000 square meters divided into three warehouses and a passenger terminal, with a viewpoint of the Guajará Bay and the Onças Island. In the first few months of its inauguration, it attracted around three million visitors, generating 600 direct jobs and hosting 29 concerts, five of which were international. Fairs and exhibitions were attended by more than three hundred thousand people.

=== Museum of the Port of Belém ===
In 1985, the Museum of the Port of Belém was inaugurated in a small building constructed in an area adjacent to the port, inside the Estação das Docas, accessible via Boulevard Castilhos França. The idea for the museum came from Raul da Silva Moreira, the port's CEO. Its collection is composed of pieces found during the restoration of the space through excavations, as well as photographs that recount its origins.

== See also ==
- Guajará Bay
- History of Belém
- Amazon rubber cycle
- Ver-o-Peso Complex
