= Giannantonio Moschini =

Italian author and Roman Catholic Somascan priest

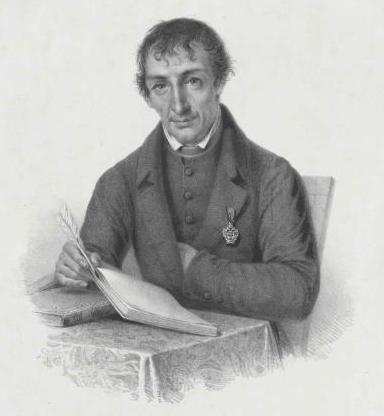
- Born: 28 June 1773 Venice
- Died: 8 July 1840 (aged 67) Venice
- Subject: art and architecture
- Notable works: Guide to Venice for the Friends of the Fine Arts

Giovanni Antonio Moschini or Giannantonio Moschini (28 June 1773 - 8 July 1840) was an Italian author and Roman Catholic Somascan priest. He was an art critic who wrote mainly about art and architecture in Venice and the Veneto.

== Biography ==
He was born to Jacopo Moschini and Margherita Matti in the parish of San Cassiano in Venice. He was buried in the oratory of the church of Santa Maria della Salute. He began his studies in a school of the Jesuits. In 1790, he joined with the reformed minor orders (Franciscan Order) but soon left in part because of his affection for art, in part due to his poor health (he was defective in walking). In 1791, he joined the Somaschian Congregation, and assigned a teaching post in the seminary at San Cipriano in Murano (1794). In 1796, he was ordained a priest. In 1796, he was given a teaching post in the Somaschi seminary at the church of Salute. This seminary became patriarchal after suppression of other such schools in Torcello and Caorle in 1818.

After the dissolution of the Venetian Republic in 1797, Moschini began to collect a lapidary inscriptions, bas reliefs, busts, and funeral monuments that were removed from the churches with the progressive suppression of orders and deconsecration of churches. They were stored, among other sites, at the cloister of Santa Maria della Salute. In addition the Seminary acquired over 30 thousand volumes and codices. In 1820, Moschini helped identify the remains of Jacopo Sansovino to the baptistery of St Mark's Basilica, after they had been removed from the church of San Geminiano, once facing Piazza San Marco (destroyed during the Napoleonic occupation).

His early authorship, related to ecclesiastical training, supported the need to study the national Italian language in an oration delivered in 1799. He translated the compendium of Antonio Landi's History of Italian Literature by Girolamo Tiraboschi (Venice 1801-05), collaborating in this with the work of the aristocratic Paduan siblings Girolamo and Nicolò da Rio in their Giornale dell’italiana letteratura. They published four volumes of Venetian literature. The work was dedicated to Michiel, a patrician and art patron from Padua, who established in his villa a salon for discussion and renaissance of the art, culture, and literature of Venice.

Courteous but short-tempered, especially with students, Moschini with his detailed memory, catalogued the voluminous heritage of ... history and culture of Venice. He was fiercely defensive of his homeland from foreign critics of Venetian culture such as the Frenchman Pierre Daru in his Histoire de Venise, or those like Ruskin who saw recent Venetian history as decline. His guide for the Island of Murano (1809), underscored the importance of the glassblowing profession on the island.

This work on Murano helped him prepare for his next larger project, his Guide to Venice for the Friends of the Fine Arts (1815). In this guide, he wished to examine every palace, edifice, canvas, statue using the skilled judgment of the intellect. His guidebook, which continued to be republished, serviced a growing industry of foreigners visiting Venice on their Grand Tour and competed with Antonio Quadri's (Otto giorni a Venezia, 1822) and Mutinelli's (Guida del forestiero per Venezia antica, 1842).

This guidebook also set the foundations for the recovery and protection of the Venetian patrimony by later scholars. In his new guide (1842), are listed a number of inns, trattorie, and Cafes. He states the price of a private furnished apartment of 3-4 rooms would be between 110 and 140 franchi (5.5-7 lire) per month. A gondola ride for one our on a boat with one oar from the mainland was 4 Austrian lire; for engaging the gondola in town, 1 lire (Zwanziger) for the first hour, and 50 cents for every extra hour. Two oar gondolas were twice as expensive. Traghetti were in use at the time. Only the Rialto bridge crossed the Canal. The entrance to the Fenice Theater was 3 Austrian lire. It listed the locations of the consulates and banking institutions. It listed current artists, book and antique venders. It contains a brief history of the City, and list of Doges. It then proceeds to meticulously chronicle buildings and artworks throughout the city, stressing churches and palaces.

He wrote many speeches and eclogues (mostly about fellow clerics), and these are collected and published posthumously. His history of engraving in Venice was published only in 1924.

He was named Cavalieri di la Corona di Ferro (Knight of the Iron Crown, 1838), Canon of the Cathedral of St. Mark, and Vice-director of Theology and Philosophy at the Seminary. He joined the Accademia in 1808, and later a variety of cultural institutions including the Venetian Atheneum (founding member in 1812), the Atheneum of Treviso (1819), the Tiberian Academy (1838). In 1839, he was named member of the Royal Veneto Institute of Science, Letters, and Arts (Regio Istituto veneto di scienze, lettere ed arti). Like his contemporary Giovanni Maria Dezan, Moschini left his works to the Patriarchal Seminary of Venice, and his manuscripts to the friars of San Michele of Murano.

== Works ==
- Della letteratura veneziana del secolo XVIII fino a' nostri giorni, Venice, 1806
- La Chiesa e il Seminario Di S. Maria Della Salute a Venezia, Ed. Antonelli, Venice, 1842 (posthume)
- Dela vita e degli Scritti dell'Abate Giambattista Gallicciolli veneziano, stamp. Palese, Venice, 1806
- Guida Per La Citta Di Venezia: All' Amico Delle Belle Arti, Typografia di Alvisopoli, Venice, 1815

Volume 2

- Guida Per La Città Di Padova: All' Amico Delle Belle Arti, Venice, 1817 (google.com)
- Della Origine E Delle Vicende Della Pittura in Padova..., Typo Crescini, Padua, 1826
- Nuova Guida Di Venezia..., 1847 (posthumous)
- Memorie Della Vita Di Antonio de Solario Detto Il Zingaro, del Seminario Patriarcale Di S. Cipriano in Murano (Speech), Venice, 1808 type Alvisopoli, Venice, 1828
- La architettura in Venezia, Ed. G. Orlandelli, 1836
- Orazione letta ... nell' esequie di monsignor ... Luciano dr. Luciani, Venice, Typo. Zerletti, 1831
- Memoria del trasporto delle ossa di fra Paolo Sarpi dalla demolita chiesa di S.M. dei Servi a quella di S.Michele di Murano, avec Emmanuele Antonio Cigogna, Editor G.Picotti, Venice, 1828
- Monumento antico collegiale scoperto a Civita-Lavinia l'anno 1816, Editor G. Antonelli, Venice, 1839
- Giovanni Bellini e pittori contemporanei dell'incisione in Venezia: memoria, Editor Zanetti, 1924

== Sources ==
- Entry in Treccani Encyclopedia by Michele Gottardi.
