= Pinho Mansion =

Historic building in Belém, Pará, Brasil

- Palacete Pinho
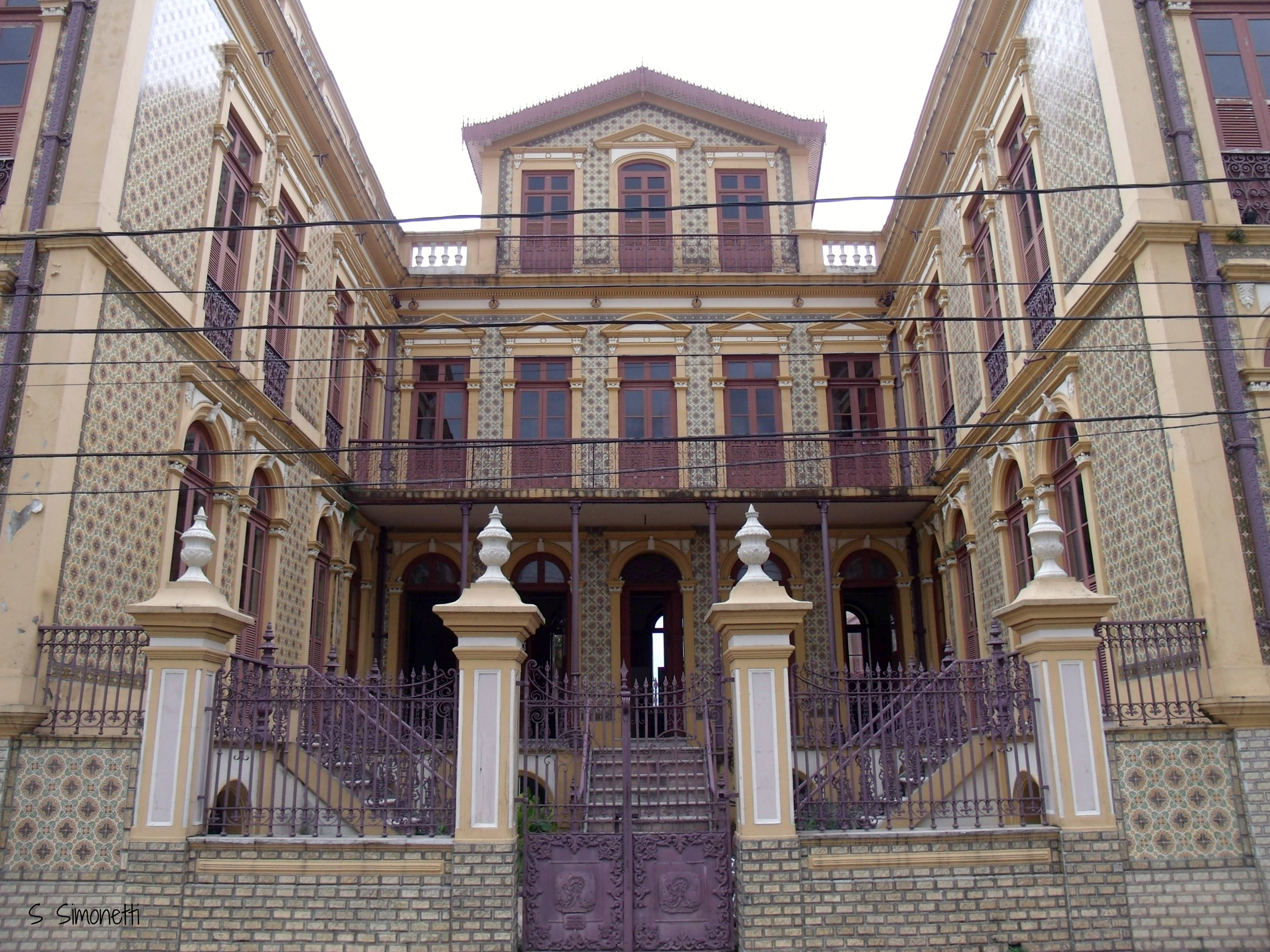
- Main facade
- Interactive map of the Pinho Mansion area

General information
- Architectural style: Eclecticism, neoclassical and baroque
- Location: Belém, Pará; Brazil
- Coordinates: 01°27′40″S 48°30′17″W
- Inaugurated: 1897; 129 years ago

Technical details
- Floor count: 3

Design and construction
- Architect: Camilo Amorim

Pinho Mansion (Portuguese: Palacete Pinho) is a historic building located at 586 Doutor Assis Street in the Cidade Velha district, in Belém, the capital of the state of Pará. In 1986, it was listed as a national heritage site by the National Institute of Historic and Artistic Heritage (IPHAN) for its importance in the city.

== History ==
The mansion was built in 1897 under the orders of Commander Antônio José de Pinho who, together with his family, occupied the property. At the time, it was considered an innovative construction for the city, which was going through a prosperous period with the rubber cycle. After its inauguration, it became a place of intense social, cultural and political activity. In 1930, José de Pinho died and his heirs kept the mansion for residential purposes until 1970, when the last family members to live there passed away. (Note: According to the writer Célia Coelho Bassalo, "at the inauguration of this mansion, the city witnessed one of its most beautiful soirees, where Parisian and London fashion was exhibited, imported exclusively for the elegant elite of Belém, both female and male. Orchestras and national and foreign artists often gathered in the salons to give harpsichord and piano concerts, which were very popular. In the style of the time, there was also no shortage of declamations, not to mention the sumptuous balls and dinners that the mansion hosted, with its tables displaying delicacies and drinks of the finest taste.")

In 1978, as the heirs could no longer afford to preserve it, the building was auctioned off and its interior decoration was removed by the buyers. In 1982, it was bought by the Y. Yamada supermarket chain, which was supposed to turn it into a cultural foundation or a reception house. However, the property was used as a warehouse for easily combustible materials such as mattresses and gas cylinders. After its registration as a landmark, which prevented its demolition, the building was expropriated in 1992 and its administration was assigned to the municipality. The mansion was disputed in court by the municipality and its former owners; during this period, it remained closed.

In 2010, the Federal Court ordered the municipality to restore the mansion, which was in a "serious process of deterioration, including a previous history of partial collapse". The lawsuit was filed by the Federal Public Prosecutor's Office (MPF) after the restoration work was suspended in 2006 due to lack of funds. The Judiciary considered that the building was "one of the most precious examples of Belém's cultural heritage and was one of the cultural references in the local golden age."

In 2011, the restoration work was completed at a final cost of R$7.8 million, including R$3.8 from companies such as Vale and Eletrobras through the Rouanet Law; the rest of the funds came from the city government. The works were delivered on the occasion of Belém's 395th anniversary. Initially, the space hosted an exhibition with more than fifty pieces from the Belém Museum of Art (MABE). In the following years, however, the building fell into disuse and deteriorated again.

In 2022, the administration was assigned to the Municipal Department of Education. At the time, a R$5 million restoration project was underway to provide a space for artistic activities related to the department's Center for Arts, Culture and Education (Nace). According to Mayor Edmilson Rodrigues, the "Pinho Mansion will be transformed into the Mansion of the Arts."

== Features ==
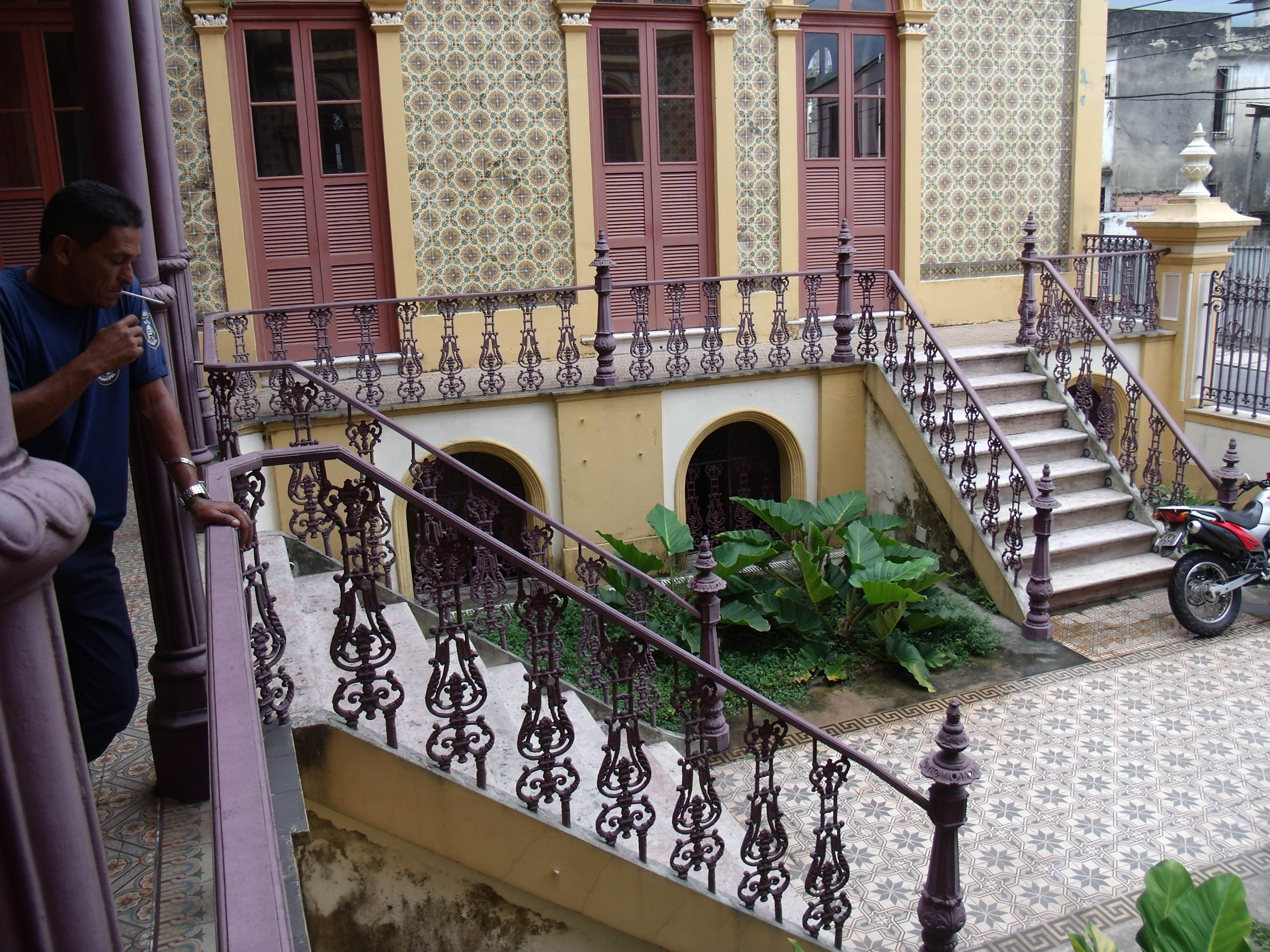
Side staircase and part of the garden.

Pinho Mansion was designed by architect Camilo Amorim. Its architecture is influenced by Portuguese palaces and Italian villas, as well as the Belle Époque styles that were evident during the rubber cycle. According to architect and urban planner Jussara Derenji, the structure "presents a set of volumes as if it were a neoclassical building - two blocks at the front and one set back that has a higher volume - resembling the Solar Barão de Guajará."

Its floor plan is U-shaped, with an open courtyard at the front in line with the Baroque style. The facades are covered in German tiles acquired from the Villeroy & Boch factory. There is a sumptuous staircase leading up to the main entrance on the second floor. On the first floor, there is a habitable basement, where the servants probably lived.

On the second floor, there is access to a large hall where family parties were held. In each side wing there were two halls, which were integrated with the main hall. There were also music rooms, games rooms and a library. The second floor was designed to contain the largest number of rooms, including bedrooms and bathrooms. On the third floor, there is a belvedere overlooking Guajará Bay.

Analysing the architectural aspects of the mansion, "there is a certain freedom in the design of the facade, which already suggests eclecticism. The composition in full arches with straight or depressed lintels, the notched or slightly projecting iron balconies, the tiled cladding are found in buildings from the colonial and imperial periods, but in this case a wooden cut-out is added." It was also noted that "the tiles on the facade are, from the point of view of color and composition, among the most beautiful of the period, and there are only two similar examples in the city, both poorly preserved."

== National heritage ==
Pinho Mansion was listed as a national historic heritage site by the National Historical and Artistic Heritage Institute (IPHAN) in August 1986 for "representing an important example of late 19th century architecture." It was suggested that the protection should cover the surrounding area, especially the neighboring two-story houses and a walled plot located in front of it.

== See also ==
- Feliz Lusitânia
- Ver-o-Peso Complex
