= Estação das Docas =

Commercial center in Belém, Pará, Brazil

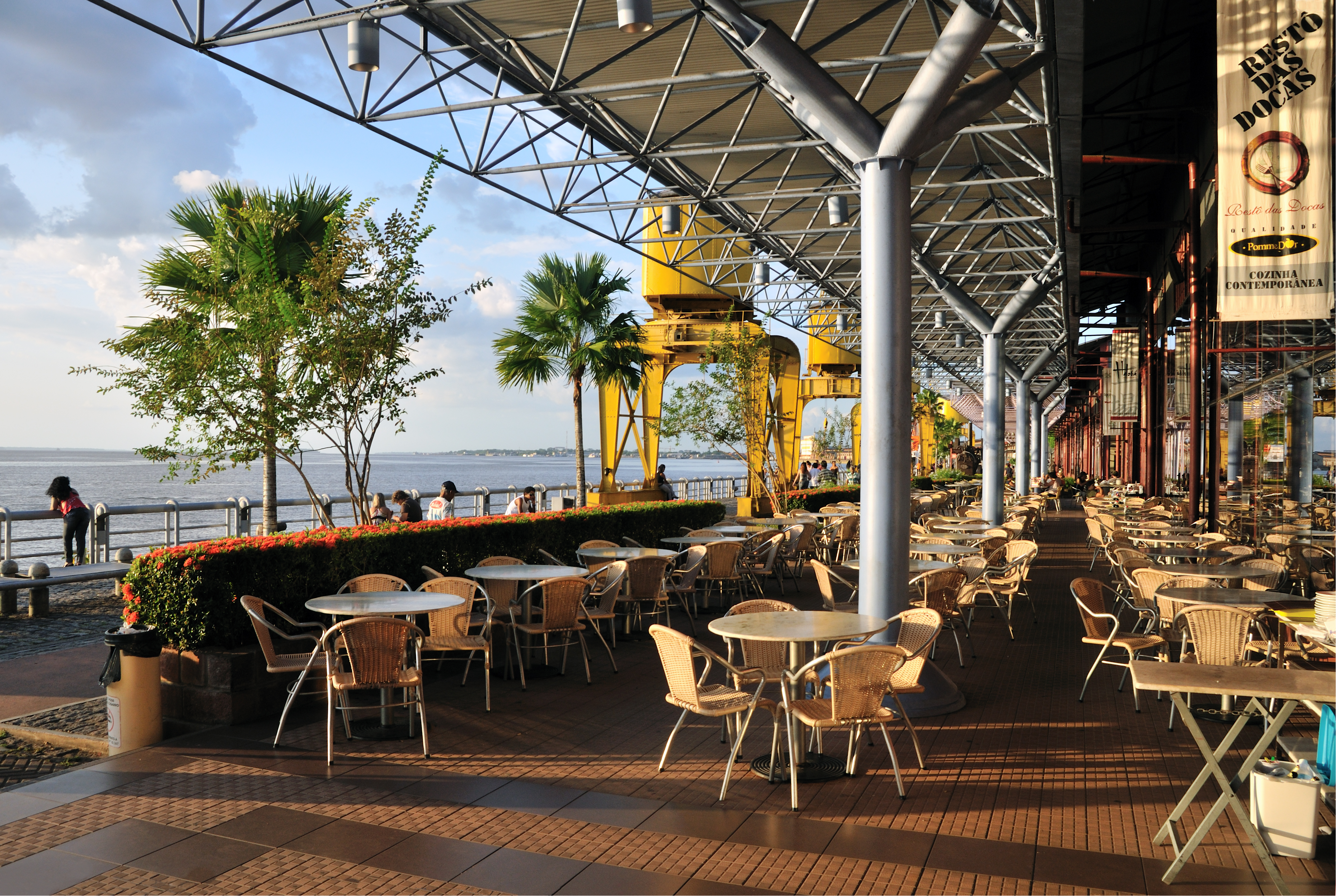
- Estação das Docas Complex
- Interactive map of the Estação das Docas area

General information
- Location: Belém, Pará; Brazil
- Coordinates: 01°26′55″S 48°30′01″W
- Inaugurated: 2000
- Owner: Pará 2000 Social Organization

The Estação das Docas (English: Docks Station) is a Brazilian tourist-cultural complex and multi-environmental space created in 2000. It is located in the Campina neighborhood, in Belém, the capital of Pará, and was originally built as part of the city's port. It is currently managed by the Pará 2000 Social Organization.

== History ==
The Estação das Docas is the result of restoration work on three warehouses in the old port of Belém, which replaced the precarious Ver-o-Peso and Reduto docks. In 1909, the first 120-meter stretch of quay and a 2,000 m^{2} warehouse were built in English iron with steam engines powering the site's equipment, typical of the architecture of the second half of the 1800s. External cranes were manufactured in the United States at the beginning of the 20th century.

The site features the ruins of the São Pedro Nolasco Fort (also known as the Bastion of Our Lady of Mercy), originally built in 1665 on the shores of Guajará Bay, in front of the Convent of the Mercedarians, to assist the Presépio Fort in the defense of the city's initial colonial nucleus. In 1825, it was destroyed during the Cabanagem and, in 1842, it was demolished for the construction of the port of Belém and to create the Rua do Imperador (now Boulevard Castilhos França).

Formerly part of the Port of Belém, Estação da Docas was inaugurated as a tourist complex on May 13, 2000, in an area that previously had high levels of crime and prostitution, revitalizing the area and transforming it into a regional leisure spot with its 500 meters of waterfront.

== Characteristics ==
The complex includes different activities, including gastronomy, culture, fashion and events. It has 32,000 square meters divided into three warehouses and a passenger terminal, with a viewpoint of the Guajará Bay and the Onças Island.

=== Divisions ===
- Warehouse 1: Boulevard of the Arts and cinema; Maria Sylvia Nunes Theater;
- Warehouse 2: Boulevard of Gastronomy;
- Warehouse 3: Boulevard of Fairs, Exhibitions; Museum of the Port of Belém;
- Amphitheater of the São Pedro Nolasco Fort;

=== Museum of the Port of Belém ===
In 1985, the Museum of the Port of Belém was inaugurated in warehouse 3 of the Estação das Docas, which can be accessed via the Boulevard Castilhos França. The construction of the museum was conceived by Colonel Raul da Silva Moreira, then CEO of the port.

Its collection, organized by a team of staff led by historian Dantas de Feitosa, tells the story of navigation in the state of Pará and is composed of photographs and pieces found through excavations during the restoration of the space.

=== São Pedro Nolasco Fort ===
The São Pedro Nolasco Fort was built in 1665 by the former captain-general of the captaincy of Grão-Pará, Rui Vaz de Siqueira, to protect the colonial settlement of Feliz Lusitânia (now Belém), along with the Presépio Fort and the São José Redoubt.

During the Cabanagem, a popular-social uprising that occurred in the then Province of Grão-Pará between 1835 and 1840, the fort suffered major damage. After the conflict, when plans were made to build a new pier for the port of Belém, it was necessary to choose between rebuilding or demolishing the fort. The then president of the province, Bernardo de Sousa Franco, consulted the then Minister of War, José Clemente Pereira, who took the question to Emperor Pedro II; he chose to dissolve the remains of the structure in 1841.

After its demolition, the area around the fort was landfilled to create the Rua do Imperador (now Boulevard Castilhos França). In 2000, the ruins were revitalized and transformed into the amphitheatre of the Estação das Docas.

=== Maria Sylvia Nunes Theater ===
Founded in 2002, the building was named after Maria Sylvia Ferreira da Silva Nunes, a professor and theater director from Pará. She was the founder of the current School of Theater and Dance at the Federal University of Pará in 1962, in partnership with her husband and writer Benedito Nunes.

== See also ==
- History of Belém
- Port of Belém
- Ver-o-Peso Complex
