= Feliz Lusitânia =

Historic tourist complex in Belém, Pará, Brazil

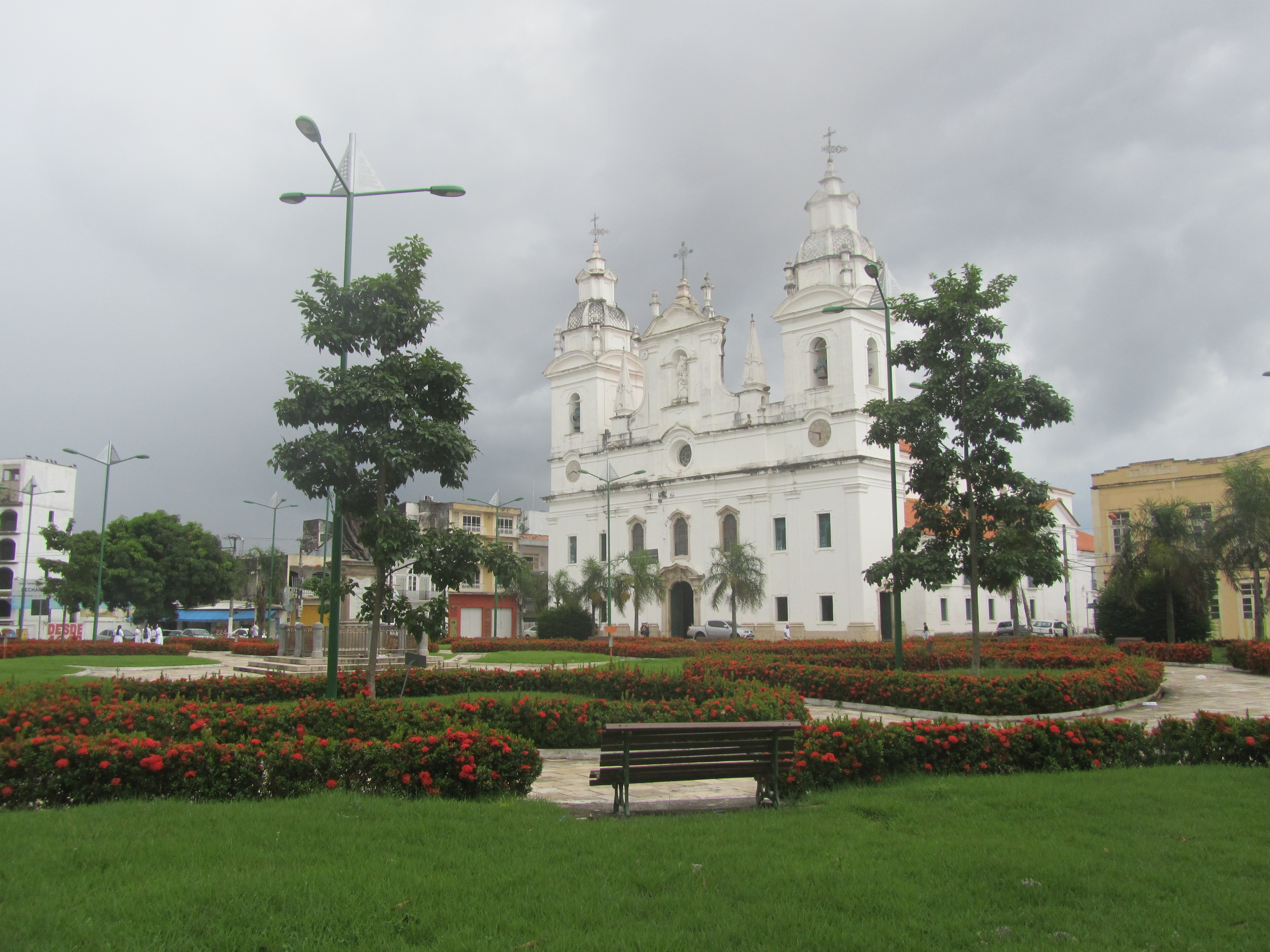
- Interactive map of the Feliz Lusitânia area
- Alternative names: Conjunto Arquitetônico e Paisagístico Feliz Lusitânia, Complexo Turístico Feliz Lusitânia

General information
- Type: Historic district, heritage site
- Location: Belém, Pará, Brazil
- Coordinates: 1°27′18″S 48°30′16″W
- Named for: Portugal
- Completed: 1616

Design and construction
- Developer: Francisco Caldeira Castelo Branco

Feliz Lusitânia (region initially called Mairi), now known as Conjunto Arquitetônico e Paisagístico Feliz Lusitânia or Complexo Turístico Feliz Lusitânia, was a Portuguese colonial settlement created in 1616 by Captain Francisco Caldeira Castelo Branco (at the behest of the King of the Iberian Union Manuel) in the then Conquista do Pará (or Empire of the Amazons), at the time of the overseas province of Colonial Brazil (1500-1815, at the time of Portuguese America), originating the Pará municipality of Belém. Feliz Lusitânia is the historical center of this municipality, located in the district of Cidade Velha, a port and tourist area restored in 2002 by the Government of the State of Pará, when the city was going through a process of historical urban decay due to verticalization.

The complex consists of a group of Portuguese monuments and buildings from the 17th and 18th centuries, listed as a heritage site by IPHAN (Institute of National Historical and Artistic Heritage). It houses the following sites: Forte do Presépio, Dom Frei Caetano Brandão square, the Palace of the Eleven Windows, the Santo Alexandre Church and the Igreja da Sé (Belém Metropolitan Cathedral).

== History ==
=== The fort ===
The settlement of Feliz Lusitânia was created in the Tupinambá and Mairi territory (current Brazilian states of Amapá, Pará, and, Maranhão), at the mouth of the Piry creek (on the shores of Guajará Bay), where the Tupinambá and Pacajá Indians resided. Captain Francisco Castelo Branco, at the behest of the king of the Iberian Union (during the Philippine Dynasty) was sent to defend the Amazon from foreigners, who disputed the territory of the so-called "drugs of the sertão", (Note: "Drogas do sertão" were spices from the region.) and to colonize the Empire of the Amazonas. Thus, on January 12, 1616, he founded a wooden fort then called Forte do Presépio (now Castelo Fort, Forte do Castelo in Portuguese) starting the settlement.

=== Municipality ===
The foundation of Feliz Lusitânia initiated a period of battles against foreigners (Dutch, English, French) in the process of securing the dominance of the region and against the natives, in a process of colonization and enslavement trying to implement an economic model based on the exploitation of indigenous labor and primary resources. This resulted in the Tupinambá Uprising, conquering in 1619 the Castelo Fort. Gaspar Cardoso changed the course of the war by killing the cacique-guerreiro Guamiaba Tupinambá, resulting in the suspension of the attacks in order to hold the funeral.

Other Indian revolts occurred until July 1621, when in 1639 Bento Maciel Parente, sergeant major of the Cabo Norte Captaincy, invested in the village of the Tapajó Indians, decimating them and dominating the Conquista do Pará. With the victory he was appointed Donatary captain of Grão-Pará, the Conquista was transformed into the then Captaincy of Grão-Pará (along with the creation of the State of Maranhão, with headquarters in São Luís), and the settlement was elevated to the category of municipality with the name "Santa Maria de Belém do Pará" or "Nossa Senhora de Belém do Grão Pará" (later "Santa Maria de Belém do Grão Pará"), when the first streets of the region were built, originating the historic district of Cidade Velha.

=== First streets ===
The first street began at the Forte do Presépio and was called Rua do Norte, and was renamed to Rua Siqueira Mendes in honor of the Pará journalist priest José de Siqueira Mendes (imperial senator).

The second street was called Espirito Santos, being renamed to Rua Doutor Assis in honor of the Pará journalist and doctor Joaquim José de Assis (founder of the newspaper A Província do Pará).

The third street was called Rua dos Cavaleiros and was renamed to Rua Doutor Malcher in honor of the physician and former governor of the capital José da Gama Malcher.

The fourth street created was called Rua São João, being renamed to João Diogo in honor of the politician João Diogo Clemente.

== Areas of the complex ==
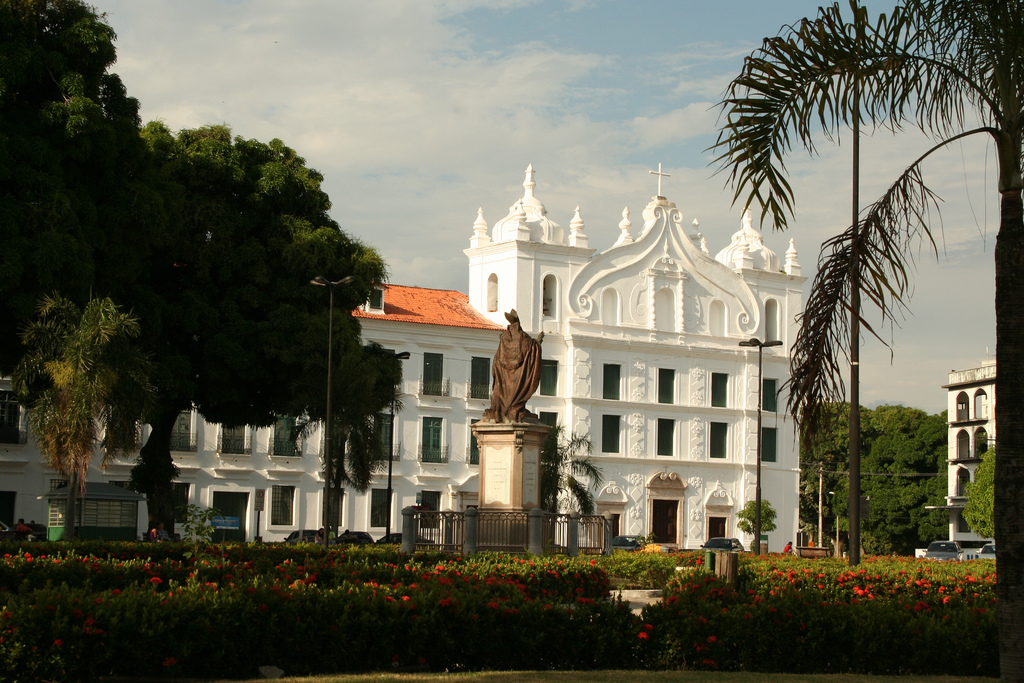
View of the Sacred Arts Museum and Santo Alexandre Church.

The Feliz Lusitânia complex is composed of:

- The Castle Fort;
- Palace of the Eleven Windows;
- Santo Alexandre Church/Church of Sacred Art (former Episcopal Palace);
- Metropolitan Cathedral of Belém;
- Ladeira do Castelo/North Street (current Siqueira Mendes Street);
- Círio Museum;
- Lauro Sodré Palace / Pará State Museum (MEP);
- Antônio Lemos Palace/Belém Art Museum (MAB);

=== Forte do Presépio ===
The cradle of the city was built by Castelo Branco in 1616 to protect the Amazon from the Dutch and French invaders. It has a collection of Marajoara and Tapajó ceramics from before the arrival of the Portuguese. The fort still has the original cannons intact.

=== Dom Frei Caetano Square ===
Completed in 1900, it is also known as Largo da Sé. It is the starting point for sightseeing in the historic center. The square has a bronze monument dedicated to Bishop Caetano Brandão.

=== Palace of the Eleven Windows ===
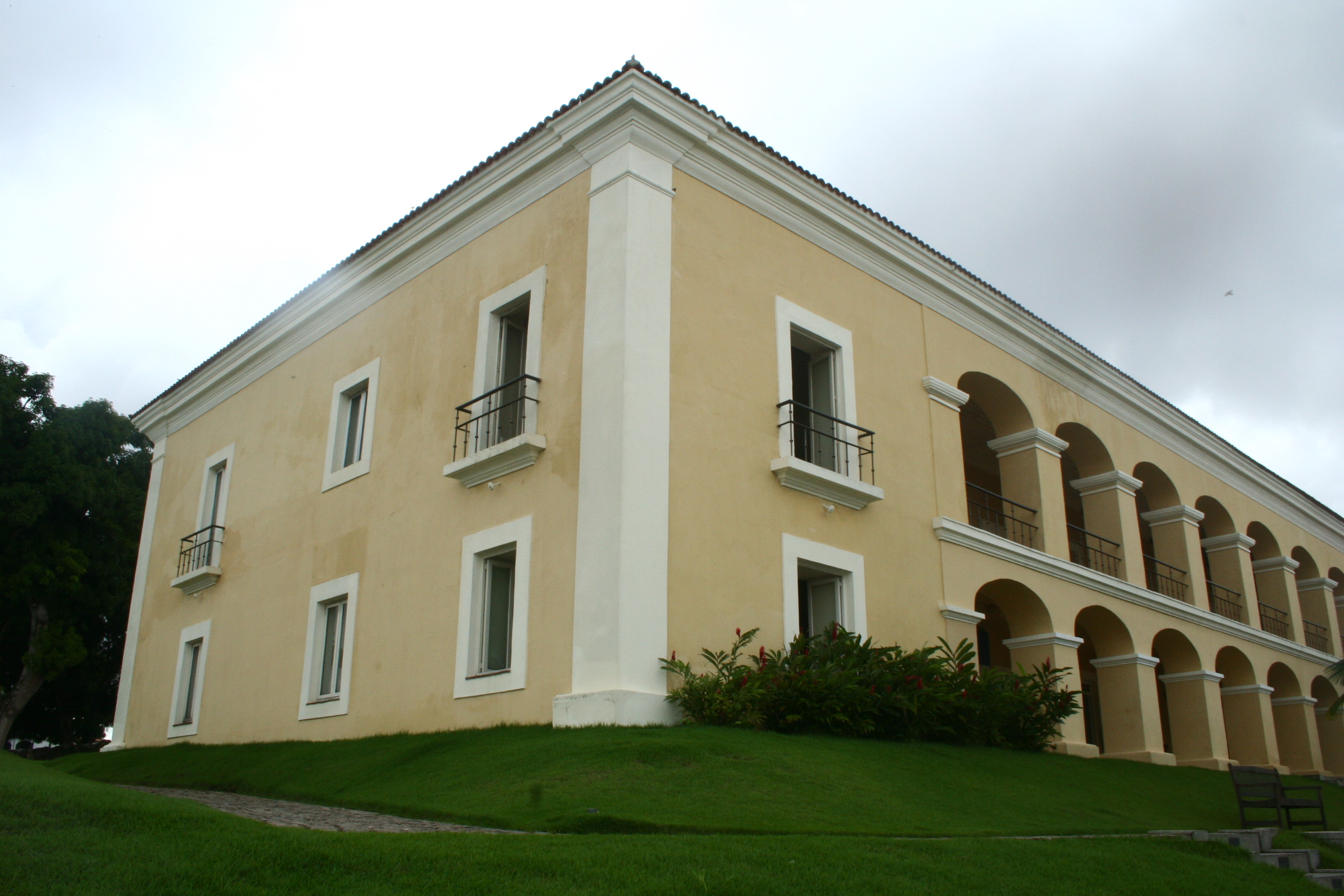
Onze Janelas Palacete

Important urban landmark in Belém, built in the 18th century by Domingos da Costa Barcelar, a wealthy mill owner. In 1768, it was converted into a military hospital by the government of Grão Pará. The house had military functions from 1870 until 2001, when it was bought by the state government to serve as a tourist attraction in the capital.

=== Sacred Art Museum ===
Architected in the Amazonian baroque style, the current version was completed in 1719. Its convent is the most important Jesuit complex in Brazil. Its construction started around 1698 and it was inaugurated on March 21, 1719. It also works as a scenic-musical space for theater shows and recitals, and was recently restored to house the Museum of Sacred Art.

The Museum of Sacred Art is composed of the Church of Santo Alexandre and the Episcopal Palace (former Colégio de Santo Alexandre).

=== Metropolitan Cathedral of Belém ===
Its construction began around 1748 and was completed in 1782 by Antonio Landi after some interruptions. Its altar was donated by Pope Pius XI, and the church has 28 English bronze chandeliers and ten side altars with remarkable paintings.

=== Ladeira do Castelo ===
The first street of Belém is considered to be Rua Siqueira Mendes, formerly Rua do Norte. However, there are cases in which Ladeira do Castelo ("Castle Hill" in English) is registered as the first street of the city of Belém, located next to Forte do Presépio, connecting the Sé Square to Feira do Açaí. The north–south; East/West tracing of the Portuguese "new cities" reinforces the register of the regional historiography about the pioneering of Rua Siqueira Mendes/Rua do Norte, including the connection of Largo da Sé (currently Frei Caetano Brandão Square) with Largo do Carmo.

== Gentrification ==
As well as the other projects linked to the gentrification issue (construction of new buildings adding value to the region and affecting the local low-income population), such as Estação das Docas and Mangal das Garças, are considered enclaves in the landscape, because they do not articulate with the surrounding community (lower class), and can generate processes of social-spatial segregation.

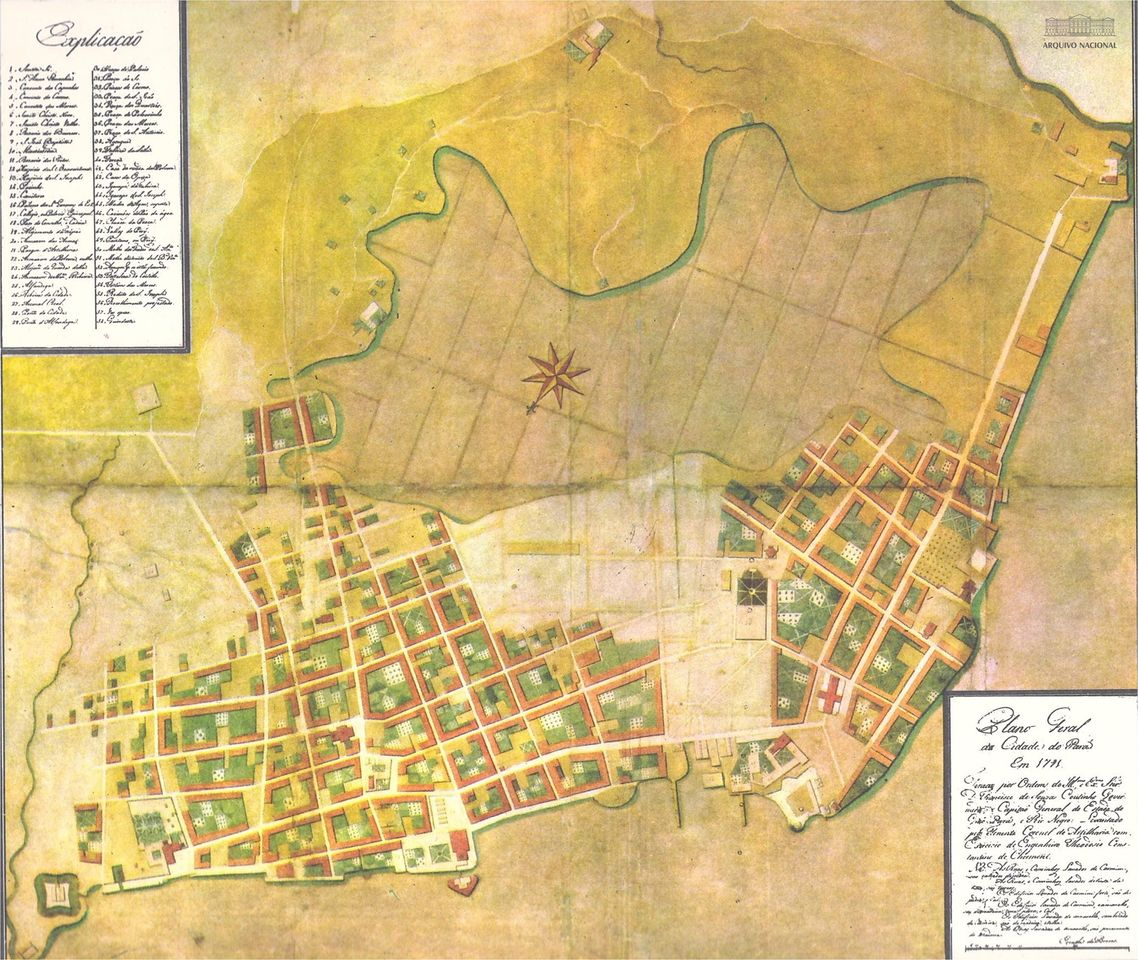
Map of the city of Belém in the 1791s, showing the neighborhoods of Cidade and Campina.

== See also ==
- Culture and tourism in Belém
