= Historic and Geographic Institute of Pará =

Brazilian organization

Coordinates: 1°27′20″S 48°30′14″W

- Instituto Histórico e Geográfico do Pará
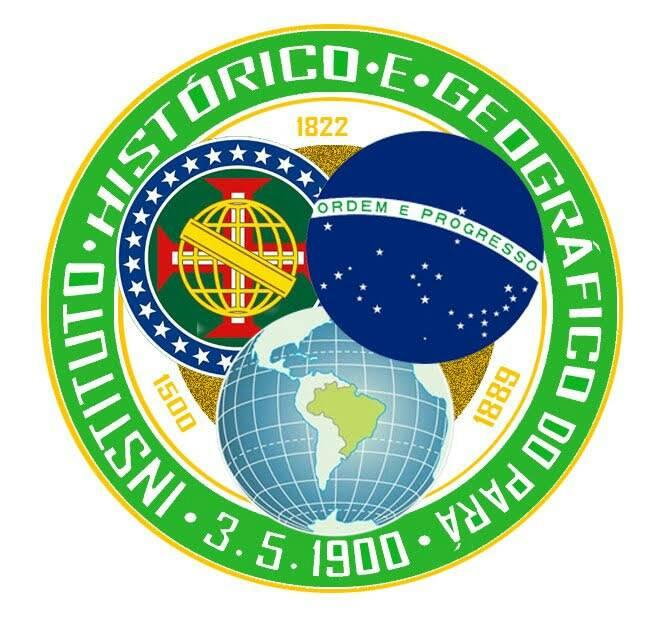
- Emblem
- Abbreviation: IHGP
- Formation: August 5, 1920; 105 years ago
- Legal status: Private non-profit institution
- Headquarters: Belém, Pará; Brazil
- President: Anaíza Vergolino
- Website: https://ihgp.net.br/principal/

The Historic and Geographic Institute of Pará (Portuguese: Instituto Histórico e Geográfico do Pará), or IHGP, is a private non-profit institution based in the Barão de Guajará Manor House, in the Brazilian city of Belém. It was founded on May 3, 1900, during the celebrations of the 4th Centenary of the discovery of Brazil. The association holds 70 seats occupied by people from Pará's historiography and academic community. It was founded simultaneously with the Academy of Letters of Pará (Academia Paraense de Letras) and the Humanitarian League (Liga Humanitária).

== History ==
=== First phase ===
The Historic, Geographical and Ethnographic Institute of Pará (Instituto Histórico, Geográfico e Etnográfico do Pará) was created on May 3, 1900, during the celebrations of the 4th Centenary of the discovery of Brazil organized by the Pará State Government, headed at the time by José Paes de Carvalho. The date chosen for the establishment of the association alluded to the date considered to be the discovery of Brazil at the time.

The commission responsible for the foundation of the institute was composed of the Barons of Guajará and Marajó, João Antonio Luiz Coelho, Américo Marques de Santa Rosa, Manoel Baena, João Lúcio de Azevedo, Bernardino Pinto Marques, Emílio Goeldi, Arthur Lemos, Justo Chermont, Henrique Santa Rosa, Arthur Vianna, Samuel Wallace McDowell III and Canon João Ferreira de Andrade Muniz; the group prepared the first statute. A civic session was held in the Peace Theater's performance hall to celebrate the establishment of the institute and presided over by Henrique Santa Rosa, 1st vice-president, with José Olinto Barroso Rebello as speaker. Domingos Antônio Raiol, Baron of Guajará, at the time considered the doyen of historians from Pará, was the first president of the organization. A few years later, many of the members withdrew and the association almost disappeared.

=== Second phase ===
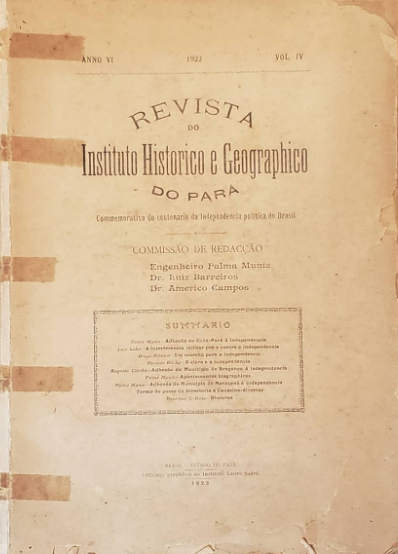
1922 edition of the IHGP Magazine.

On March 6, 1917, during the commemorations of the first centenary of the Pernambuco Revolution of 1817, the second phase of the Historic and Geographical Institute of Pará was launched. Both former members of the first association and new members joining the newly founded organization participated. At the time, discussions were held as to whether it was a continuation of the old institute founded in 1900 under a new name, or whether it was the foundation of a new institute, with a new founding date and a new name. In the second phase, the IHGP became a regular institution. In 1918, the IHGP Magazine was launched.

Former IHGP presidents were Ignácio Baptista de Moura, Henrique Santa Rosa, Luiz Estevão de Oliveira, Henrique Jorge Hurley, Antonio Teixeira Gueiros, Abelardo Leão Condurú, Maurício Cordovil Pinto, Josué Justiniano Freire and Ernesto Horácio Cruz. Luiz Barreiros and Raymundo Avertano Barreto da Rocha also occupied the position of vice-presidents for a significant period. Lauro Sodré and Magalhães Barata were the honorary presidents, since they contributed greatly to the creation and consolidation of the IHGP during their governments in Pará. In 1943, during Magalhães Barata's second administration, Belém City Hall donated the building that had belonged to the family of Domingos Antônio Raiol to the IHGP to serve as the institute's headquarters.

=== Third phase ===
The third phase began in the 1960s during Ernesto Cruz's presidency. At this time, the statutes, which had last been revised at the end of the 1930s, were significantly reformed, and the internal regulations were established. The number of permanent members was fixed at 40 and each one occupied a seat with their respective patron. New forms of admission and induction protocols were instituted. The IHGP Magazine, which had not been published since the 1950s, resumed being printed and distributed under the patronage of the Federal University of Pará (Universidade Federal do Pará - UFPA), which became an important partner of the IHGP. Silveira Netto, rector of the university at the time, became a benefactor of the organization, as did the governor of Pará, Alacid Nunes, who gave important support to the institute.

In 1975, José da Silveira Netto assumed the presidency of the IHGP until 1996, when he was replaced on an interim basis by vice-president Victor Tamer. In 1997, he handed over management to a provisional governing board, which included members Guaraciaba Quaresma Gama and Geraldo Mártires Coelho. Between 1995 and 1996, work was carried out to clean and organize the IHGP's documentary collection, which subsequently became the Palma Muniz Archive (Arquivo Palma Muniz), under the direction of professor and historian José Maia Bezerra Neto and archivist Ana Negrão do Espírito Santo and the sponsorship of the Cultural Foundation of the Municipality of Belém (Fundação Cultural do Município de Belém - FUMBEL) and UFPA.

=== Fourth phase ===
The fourth phase started with the election of the new board for the 1998–2001 term chaired by Geraldo Mártires Coelho. Changes were introduced to the admission procedure for the IHGP, which became more accessible and democratic. Until then, it was necessary to obtain a nomination from 3 members, which would be submitted to the Membership Admission Committee, whose favorable opinion or not would be approved at the General Meeting. After the change, the need for prior nomination was abolished and applications to fill a vacancy were opened by means of a public notice. Another change was the re-establishment of monthly fees for members in order to obtain income that would help maintain the institute. The IHGP Newsletter was launched with the aim of publicizing the organization's activities, and the agreement with FUMBEL, which allowed the transfer of funds for financial aid to the IHGP and the renovation of the roof, was signed.

In 2001, a new provisional governing board, chaired by Guaraciaba Quaresma Gama and composed of members José de Araújo Mindello and Leônidas Braga Dias, was formed. In 2002, Guaraciaba Gama assumed the presidency; he was also re-elected in 2005 and 2008. In August 2010, due to the death of Guaraciaba Gama, Anaíza Vergolino became president of the IHGP until May 2, 2011. During the administration of Guaraciaba Gama, the renovation of the IHGP building was launched as part of the Monumenta Program, under the sponsorship of the Federal Government and Belém City Hall.

=== Fifth phase ===
In 2011, the IHGP's fifth phase began with Anaíza Vergolino becoming the first woman president elected in the association. Her administration was characterized by surveying the institute's general situation, recomposing and reordering the membership by filling vacant chairs and launching the reorganization and restoration of the archive. An agreement was signed with the State Secretariat for Culture (Secretaria de Estado de Cultura - SECULT), a photocopying machine was purchased for external services, the number of members increased and the monthly fees rose. In 2017, 30 full members joined the IHGP, new chairs were founded and editions of the electronic magazine were resumed.

== Magazine ==
The IHGP Magazine is a biannual online publication whose aim is to disseminate material relating to studies and reflections in the field of geography, history, folklore and related areas. It welcomes texts in the form of articles, research notes, essays, interviews and reviews from anyone interested in the knowledge provided by science.

== Partnership with UFPA ==
In 2023, the Federal University of Pará (UFPA) and the Historic and Geographical Institute of Pará (IHGP) organized the exhibition "Muddy Waters - Insurgent Landscapes of the Accession of 1823, the Bicentenary of August 15" (“Águas Turvas – Paisagens Insurgentes da Adesão de 1823, o Bicentenário do 15 de agosto”). It features texts, images and objects from the IHGP's museographic, bibliographic and archival collections, as well as items from private collections. It includes contributions from Victorino Chermont de Miranda, Paula Caluff Rodrigues, Elza Lima, Luiz Braga, Armando Sobral, Anselmo Paes, José Neto and Pablo Mufarrej. Among the sets on display are: Fantasmas do Brigue, Vulcão da Anarquia, Ninfas do Guajará and Espólios da Memória.

During the visit, four large rooms organized into thematic nuclei are visited: The Baron, independence and political riots (O Barão, a independência e os motins políticos), which contextualizes the life and work of the politician and historian Domingos Antônio Raiol; The Independence of Brazil in Grão-Pará (A Independência do Brasil no Grão-Pará), which discusses the Napoleonic wars, the Portuguese invasion of Cayenne from Pará and the process of Pará's accession to the Independence of Brazil; The History Taught (A História Ensinada), which debates independence based on the history taught and celebrated in school groups in Pará; and Ephemerides of the Nation (Efemérides da Nação), which showcases the independence celebrations in different periods, discussing the construction of memories and reinterpretations of a seminal event for the history of Brazil in Pará.

== Founding members ==
List of the institute's founders in 1900:

- Arthur Otávio Nobre Viana;
- Américo Santa Rosa;
- Arthur Lemos;
- Augusto Olímpio de Araújo e Souza;
- Antônio Firmo Dias Cardoso;
- Armando Gentil;
- Antonio Passos de Miranda;
- Antônio da Costa e Silva;
- Antônio José de Lemos;
- Antônio Sérgio Ferreira;
- Bento Miranda;
- Bernardino Pinto Marques;
- Bento de Figueiredo Tenreiro Aranha;
- Celestino Ferreira;
- Domingos Antônio Raiol;
- Domiciano Herculano Perdigão Cardoso;
- Domingos Maltez;
- Emil Augusto Goeldi;
- Eneias Martins;
- Estephânio Barroso;
- Ernesto Adolpho de Vasconcelos Chaves;
- Euphrosino Nery;
- Eládio de Amorim Lima;
- Estephânio Francisco da Silva;
- Francisco Ferreira de Vilhena Alves;
- Flávio Cardoso;
- Felipe Duarte;
- Francisco José de Sales;
- Gentil Bitencourt;
- João Lúcio de Azevedo;
- Higino Armanajás;
- João Antônio Luis Coelho;
- João Ferreira de Andrade Muniz;
- Henrique Santa Rosa;
- Genuino Amazonas de Figueiredo;
- José Coelho da Gama e Abreu;
- José Olintho Barroso Rebelo;
- Justiniano de Serpa;
- Jacques Huber;
- João Luis de La-Rocque;
- José Barbosa Rodrigues;
- Luiz Demétrio Tavares;
- Manoel Ignácio da Cunha;
- Manoel Baena;
- Manoel Miranda Simões;
- Misael Corrêa Seixas;
- Otávio Pires;
- Raimundo Bertoldo Nunes;
- Raimundo Meschiades Alves da Costa;
- Raimundo Ciríaco Alves da Cunha;
- Samuel Wallace MacDowell III;
- Sabino Henrique da Luz;
- Thomaz Cavalcante;
- Virgílio Cardoso de Oliveira;
- Victor Manoel de Azevedo Barranca.

== See also ==
- Brazilian Historic and Geographic Institute
- Historic and Geographic Institute of Rio Grande do Sul
