= Solar Barão de Guajará =

Historic building in Belém, Pará, Brazil

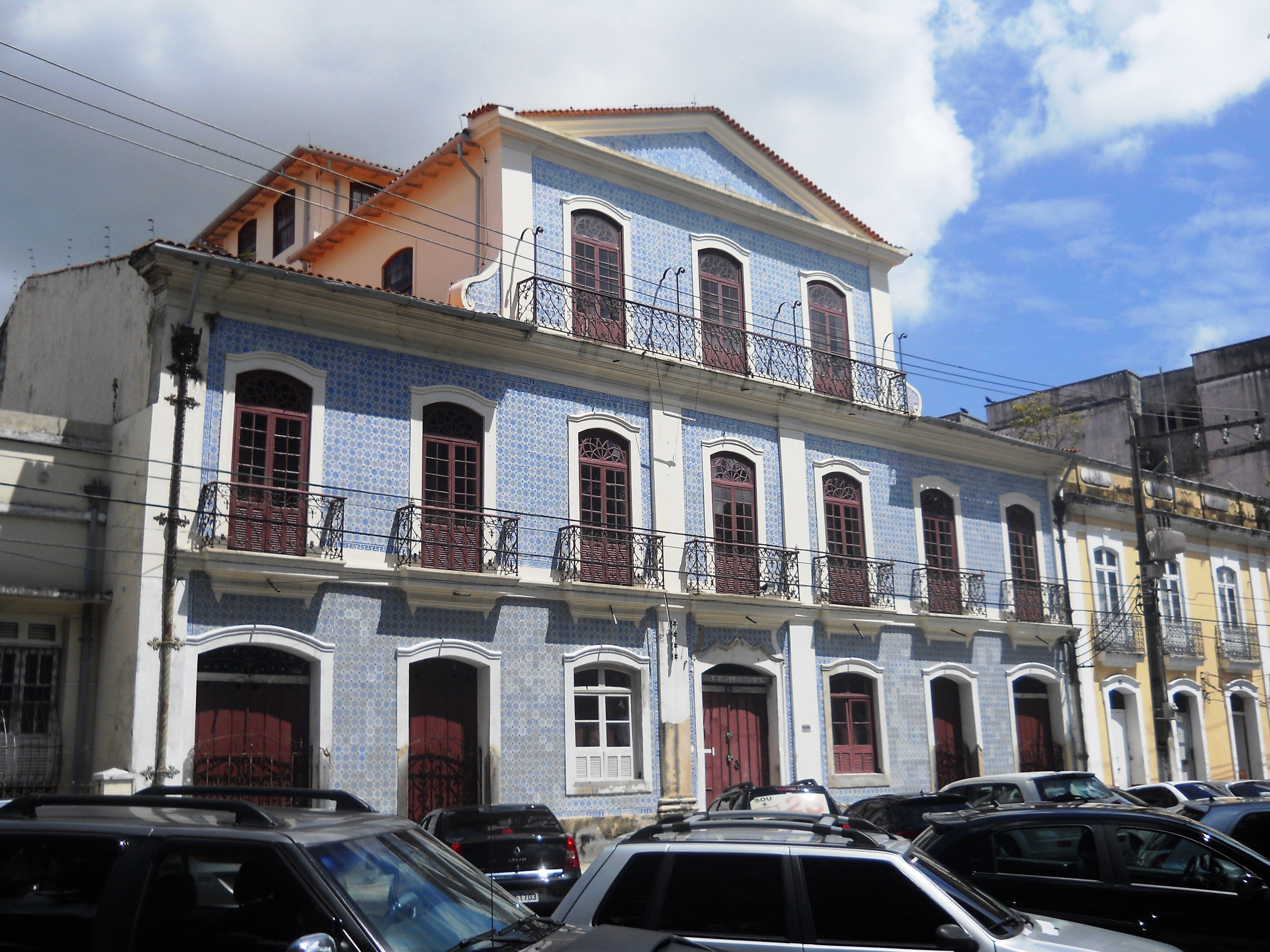
- Interactive map of the Solar Barão de Guajará area
- Alternative names: House on Pedro II Square

General information
- Status: Headquarters of the Historic and Geographic Institute of Pará
- Location: Belém, Pará; Brazil
- Coordinates: 1°27′20″S 48°30′15″W
- Inaugurated: 19th century

Solar Barão de Guajará, also known as Casa à Praça Pedro II (English: House on Pedro II Square), is a manor house located in Belém, the capital of the state of Pará, Brazil, more specifically in the Dona Tomázia Perdigão Street. It was built in the 19th century and has three floors, the last of which is smaller. The inner courtyard shows elements of the Moorish influence on Iberian architecture. (Note: The number of floors in the manor house varies from two to four, depending on the source. For information purposes, the number used is that referenced by the National Historical and Artistic Heritage Institute.)

The manor house was once owned by Antônio Lacerda de Chermont, the Viscount of Arari, before being transferred to his niece, who was married to Domingos Raiol, the Baron of Guajará. It was acquired by the City Hall during the 1920s and later donated to the Historic and Geographic Institute of Pará. In 1970, it was reopened after a series of renovations and became the Barão de Guarajá Library and the institute's headquarters.

In 1950, the manor house was listed by the National Historic and Artistic Heritage Institute (IPHAN), with inscription number 274, through process 327-T-1943.

== History ==
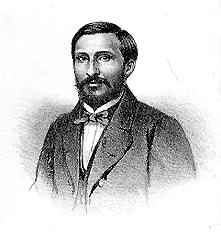
Domingos Antônio Raiol, Baron of Guajará

The manor house was built at the beginning of the 19th century, but there is no documentation to prove the exact date of its construction. In the middle of the 19th century, it belonged to the Viscount of Arari, who made improvements, such as doors and windows with iron railings bearing his emblem, and was active in public life, holding positions such as president of the province. (Note: Historian Ernesto Cruz considers it possible that the manor house was one of the first buildings in Belém after the palace and the governors' residence.)

When the Viscount of Arari died, the building was inherited by his niece, Maria Vitória Pereira de Chermont, who married Domingos Antônio Raiol, the Baron of Guajará, from whom the manor's current name comes. Raiol was a historian, parliamentarian, writer and president of various provinces.

In 1879, the Baron of Guajará founded the Quinze de Agosto Society at the manor, which participated annually in the festivities commemorating the province's accession to Brazilian independence. The meetings held in the building brought together intellectual and civic personalities. As well as being a founding member of the Historic, Geographic and Ethnologic Institute of Pará, the baron was also its first president.

Domingos Antônio Raiol died in 1912 and his wife Maria Vitória lived in the manor until her death in 1925. In the following years, the building was occupied by his heirs. In the 1920s, it was acquired by the municipal government. Since 1944, it has housed the Historic and Geographic Institute of Pará. In 1950, it was listed by the National Historic and Artistic Heritage Institute (IPHAN) for its cultural importance.

== Characteristics ==
Solar Barão de Guajará is inspired by Portuguese architecture. It occupies a 950m² plot and its floor plan is shaped like an "O". The tiles covering it are one of the oldest used on a facade in Belém. They have geometric designs in white and blue and were probably imported from Portugal.

On the facade, the highest structure has a symmetrical shape with three doors, windows and a triangular pediment flanked by fins. On the second floor there are windows with iron balconies, and on the first floor, the main door has a wavy ornamental frame. The internal courtyard acts as a central point and facilitates the distribution and functions of the rooms and provides lighting and ventilation for the other rooms.

The second floor, the building's main space, contains the family's social and intimate areas, such as the baron's study, the dining room and the bedrooms. The library was supposedly on the third floor.

On the first floor, there is a room with independent circulation that was probably used as a private chapel open to the public. Another possibility suggests that it was used for stores or warehouses, as the first floor was built with simpler materials.

== Collection ==
The manor has a collection of documents, books, furniture and objects. It also houses the José Veríssimo Library, which has a catalog of 15,000 to 20,000 books.

== See also ==
- Antonio Lemos Palace
- Dom Frei Caetano Brandão Square
- Pinho Mansion
