= Conquista do Pará =

Former subdivision of Brazil

Conquista do Pará Império do Amazonas
- Coat of arms

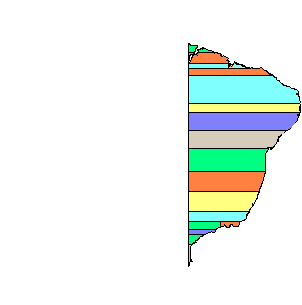
- Capital: Salvador
- Common languages: Portuguese, Indigenous languages, African languages, Nheengatu
- Religion: Catholicism
- Government: Monarchy
- King
- Today part of: Brazil

Conquista do Pará (region initially called pa'ra, from Tupi-Guarani: "river-sea"), also called the Império das Amazonas (in English: Amazonas Empire), now the Brazilian state of Pará, was an indigenous territory transformed into Portuguese colonial territory in 1615 by the military man and nobleman Alexandre de Moura, at the beginning of the colonization of the Amazon and conquest of the Amazon River. It was located in the then Captaincy of Maranhão (1534-1621).

The Captaincy of Maranhão had 75 leagues of coastline, extending from the Bay of All Saints to the mouth of the da Cruz River, covering the northeastern area of the current state of Maranhão, the eastern region of the Conquista do Pará (where Belém is today), and the island of Marajó.

In 1621, the Conquista do Pará was transformed into the Captaincy of Grão Pará and the State of Maranhão, consolidating Portuguese rule in the Amazon.

== History ==
In 1534, the Captaincy of Maranhão was created along with 13 other hereditary captaincies, in the colonial period of Portuguese America, combining feudal and capitalist elements; a system that had been used successfully in the development of the islands of Madeira and Azores.

In 1572, the Portuguese Crown, still perceiving flaws in colonial administration, divided Portuguese America into two general governments (from 1572 to 1577): Government of the North (with Salvador as capital) which had administrative dominion over the future Conquista do Pará (1615); and the Government of the South, with its capital in Rio de Janeiro.

In 1615, the military man and nobleman Alexandre de Moura began the protection and colonization of the Amazon region, conquering the mouth of the Amazon River and transforming the indigenous region in the far north called Mairi (home to the Tupinambá and Pacajá Indians under the command of cacique Guaimiaba), into the Portuguese colonial territory Conquista do Pará or Império das Amazonas ("Amazonas Empire") (1615–1621), located in the then Captaincy of Maranhão (1534–1621).

In 1616, in an attempt to secure dominance in eastern Amazon and protect the region from the Dutch and British in search of spices (the drogas do sertão), the Portuguese, at the behest of the King of the Iberian Union/Philippine Dynasty, Manuel I, held the military expedition Feliz Lusitânia. It was commanded by Captain Francisco Caldeira Castelo Branco and founded the Conquista do Pará near the Piry creek on January 12, 1616, starting the colonial settlement named after the military expedition (present-day city of Belém).

In 1621, Conquista do Pará was transformed into the Captaincy of Grão Pará and the State of Maranhão (1621–1775).

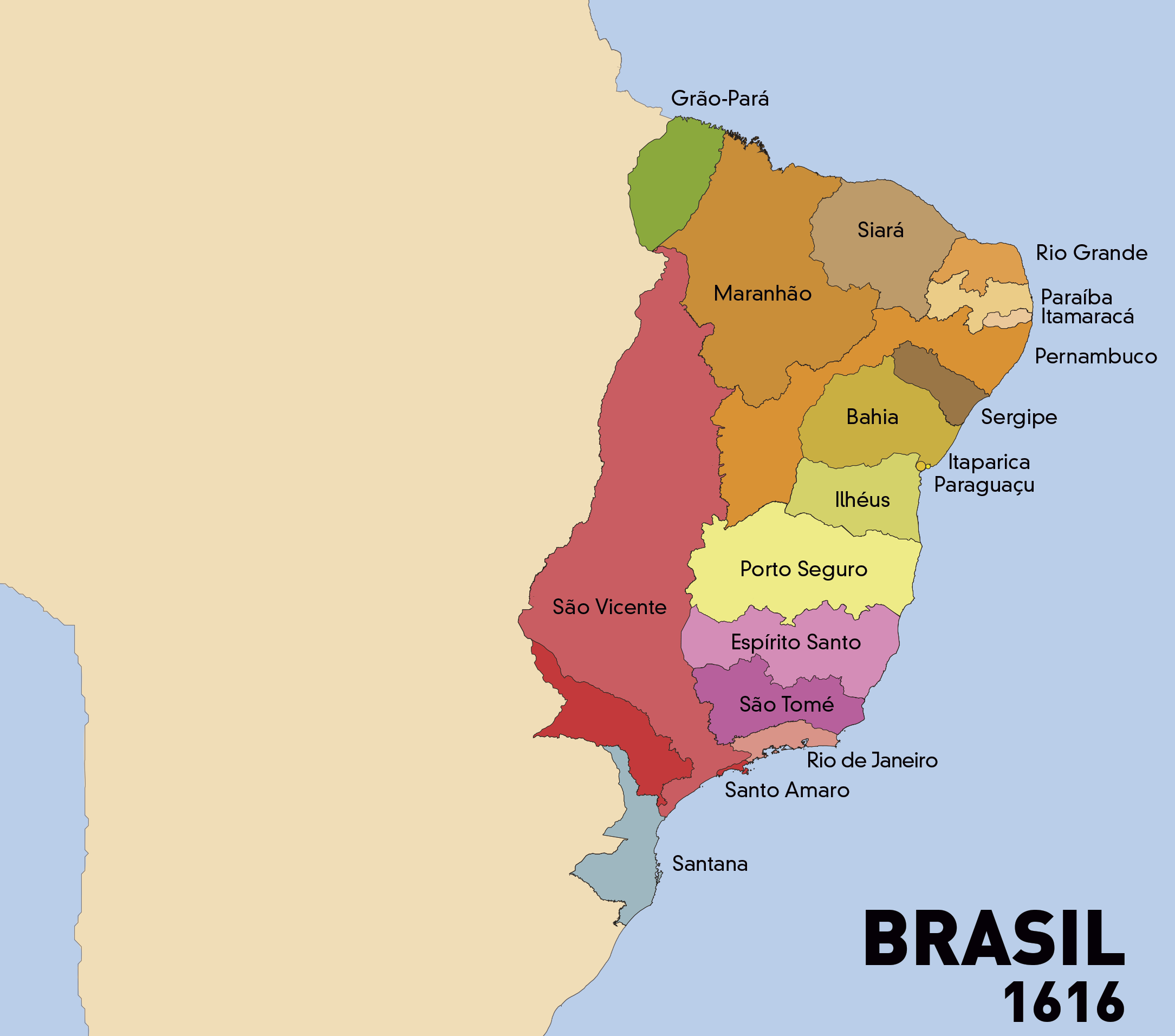
Map of Brazil in the 1610s, when the Captaincies of Maranhão and Grão Pará were created.

Preceded by: Pa'ra Indian Region 1621	History of Pará Conquista do Pará Império das Amazonas 1615 – 1621	Succeeded by: Captaincy of Grão Pará 1621–1822
