= Captaincy of Grão-Pará =

Former Captaincy of Brazil

Captaincy of Grão-Pará Capitania do Grão-Pará
- Flag
- Capital: Belém, Pará
- Official languages: Portuguese
- Religion: Catholicism
- Government: Absolute monarchy
- Legislature: Cortes (politics)
- History
  - Established: 1621
  - Changed to Province: 28 February 1821
- Currency: Réis
- Today part of: Brazil

The Capitania of Grão-Pará, in English Captaincy of Grão-Pará (region initially called pa'ra, from Tupi-Guarani: "river-sea") was one of the administrative units of Colonial Brazil (in Portuguese America), created in 1621 along with the State of Grão-Pará and Maranhão, from the evolution of the Conquista do Pará (or Empire of Amazonas) a Portuguese colonial territory created in 1616 by Alexandre de Moura in the Captaincy of Maranhão.

== Toponomy ==
The etymology of the name of the former administrative unit derives from the Pará river, whose name comes from the Tupi-Guarani "pa'ra", meaning "river the size of the sea" or "large river", due to its great sea-like extension, which cuts through the region and was believed to be a direct extension of the Amazon River.

== History ==
The Captaincy of Grão-Pará has its origin in the context of the conquest of the Amazon River and Eastern Amazonia in 1580, a period of conflict with foreign forces vying for the so-called "drugs of the sertão" (spices from the area). The region was first called the Conquista do Pará, also known as the Empire of the Amazonas, having as "capital" the colonial villa Feliz Lusitânia (in homage to Portugal). The oldest document that makes mention of the term "capitania", to denominate the region of the conquest is posterior to the year 1620. Legitimating the territory as a captaincy occurred in parallel to the creation of the State of Maranhão, in the year 1621.

== Chronology ==
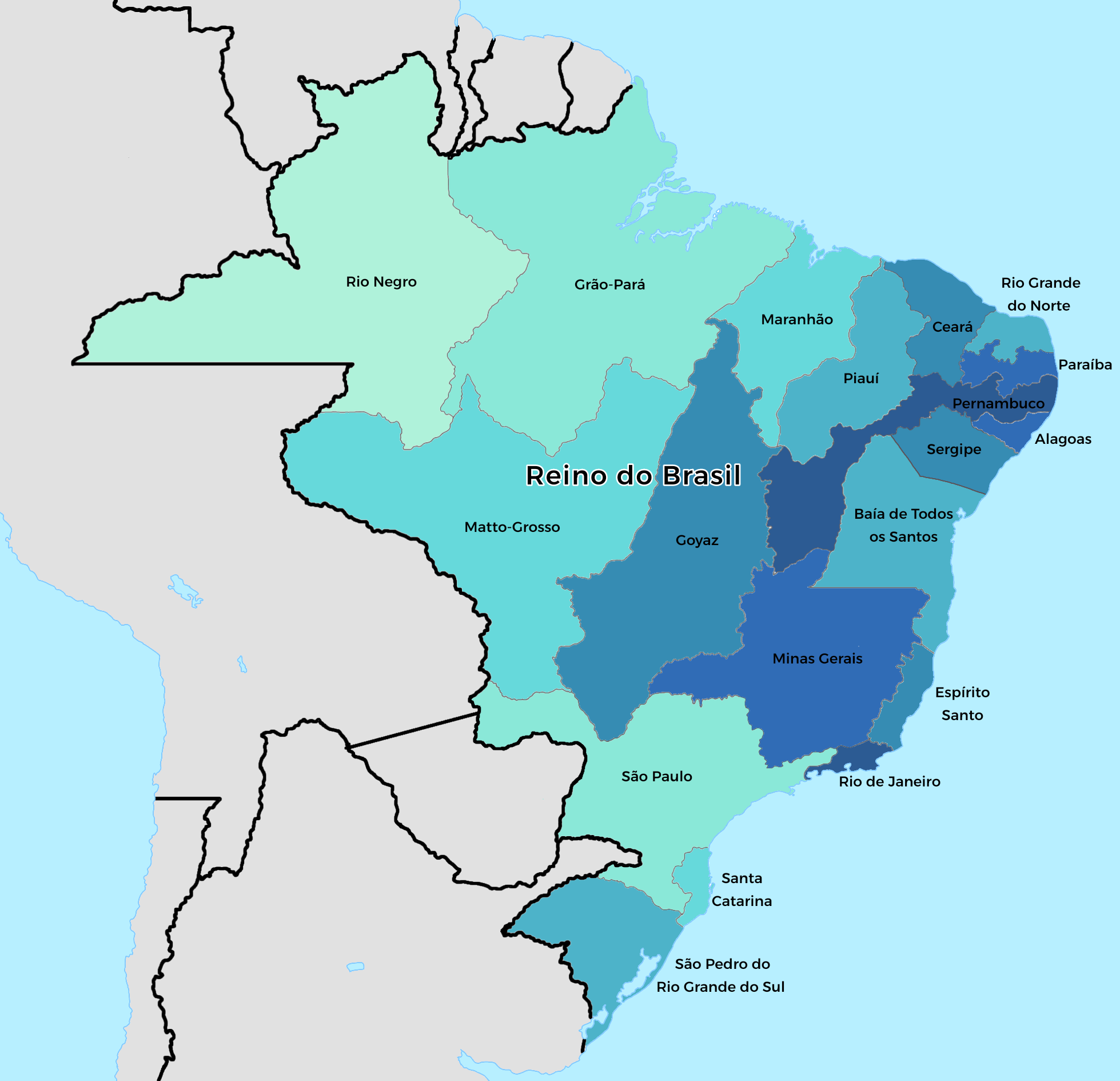
Brazil in 1817

Year	Event
1534	The Portuguese Crown, under King John III divided Brazil into 14 hereditary captaincies, among them Maranhão which included the Conquista do Pará or Empire of Amazonas (now the Brazilian state of Pará).
1572	Sebastian divided the colony into two general governments: Government of the North, based in Salvador, responsible for territories from the Captaincy of Bahia to the Captaincy of Maranhão, and; Government of the South, based in Rio de Janeiro, which administered the territories from the Captaincy of Ilhéus to the Captaincy of Santana.
1615	The Pa'ra Indian territory is transformed into the Portuguese colonial territory Conquista do Pará, in the Captaincy of Maranhão, by Alexandre de Moura, beginning the colonization of the Amazon.
1616	The foundation of Forte do Presépio, in Guajará Bay, originated the colonial settlement Feliz Lusitânia (today Belém, capital of the Pará state) in the Conquista do Pará, the first fortification of this model and most important in the Amazon territory, in order to protect itself from incursions of the Dutch and English in search of spices.
1621	The Philippine Dynasty under Philip III (Iberian Union) divided the territory of Portuguese America into two autonomous administrative units: State of Maranhão to the north, with its capital in São Luís, in order to secure possession of the territory and promote development; encompassing the Captaincy of Grão-Pará, of Maranhão and of Ceará, and; State of Brazil to the south, whose capital was Salvador, encompassing the other captaincies.
1637	Creation of the Captaincy of Cabo Norte, in the region of the current state of Amapá, extinguished at the end of the 17th century.
1639	Conquista was transformed into the then Captaincy of Grão-Pará (along with the creation of the State of Maranhão, headquartered in São Luiz); The village Feliz Lusitânia was elevated to the category of municipality with the denomination of "Santa Maria de Belém do Pará" or "Nossa Senhora de Belém do Grão Pará"; Opening of the first streets of the municipality, originating the historic neighborhood of Cidade Velha.
1654	The Maranhão State was renamed to Maranhão and Grão-Pará State.
1680	The territory of the Captaincy of Ceará passed from the State of Maranhão to the State of Brazil, integrating with the Captaincy of Pernambuco.
1718	Creation of the Captaincy of Piauí, dismembered from the Captaincy of Maranhão, integrating the State of Maranhão.
1751	The State of Maranhão was renamed to State of Grão-Pará and Maranhão, with its capital transferred from São Luís to Belém. Its territorial extension includes the current states of Amazonas, Roraima, Pará, Amapá, Maranhão, and Piauí.
1755	Creation of the Captaincy of Rio Negro (current Amazonas State), with its headquarter established in the village of Mariuá (current Barcelos), separated from the Captaincy of Grão-Pará but remaining integrated into the State of Grão-Pará and Maranhão, which was composed of four Captaincies: São José do Rio Negro, Grão-Pará, Maranhão, and Piauí.
1772	The Portuguese Crown divided the State of Grão-Pará and Maranhão into two administrative units: State of Grão-Pará and Rio Negro, headquartered in Belém, and; State of Maranhão and Piauí, headquartered in São Luís.; Thus, Portuguese America came to comprise three autonomous administrative units.
1774	In order to centralize and increase control, the states of Grão-Pará and Rio Negro; and Maranhão and Piauí became Captaincies and were unified with the State of Brazil, subordinated to the Viceroy of Brazil, headquartered in Rio de Janeiro.
1780	Creation of small industries: cotton, ceramics and candles, rope manufacture, turtle butter ("manteiga de tartaruga"), and other agriculture products such as tobacco, maize, manioc, cocoa, rice, cotton, sugar cane, and cattle breeding in the Rio Branco Valley.
1783	Naturalist Alexandre Rodrigues Ferreira began his "Philosophical Voyage through the Captaincies of Grão-Pará, Rio Negro, Mato Grosso, and Cuiabá", exploring the northern and western regions of Brazil.
1822	The Independence of the Kingdom of Brazil occurred and the Captaincies were denominated Provinces. Grão-Pará experienced a period of uncertainty, whether the Captaincy would become an independent country, unite with Brazil or continue with Portugal. The 1st Junta do Pará Independente was created. Uprisings of troops loyal to Portugal broke out, known as "Independence Wars", involving the provinces of Pará, Maranhão and Bahia.
1823	The Captaincy of Grão-Pará joined the independent Empire of Brazil, which had been separate in the colonial period, an episode known as the "Accession of Pará" proclaimed by Romualdo Coelho, thus the Captaincy was incorporated into the Empire as the province of Grão-Pará.
1832	Due to its small population and small production, the Rio Negro Province was administratively downgraded, being named Comarca of Alto Amazonas and subordinated to the Grão-Pará Province.
1835	The Cabanagem revolt began and spread throughout the Amazon. A government of the people was installed and remained in power until 1838.
1850	The Province of Grão-Pará was extinguished and split into two units, forming the Pará Province and the Amazonas Province (elevation of the Comarca of the Upper Amazonas with its seat in the city of Nossa Senhora da Conceição da Barra do Rio Negro, current Manaus).
1879	Peak of the rubber cycle.
1889	After the proclamation of the Republic, the Provinces were turned into States, and the "Province of Pará" changed to "State of Pará".

== See also ==
- Captaincies of Brazil

Preceded by Conquista do Pará; 1616–1621	History of Pará; Captaincy of Grão-Pará; 1621–1822	Succeeded by Province of Grão-Pará; 1821–1889
