= Companhia Docas do Pará =

Brazilian maritime company

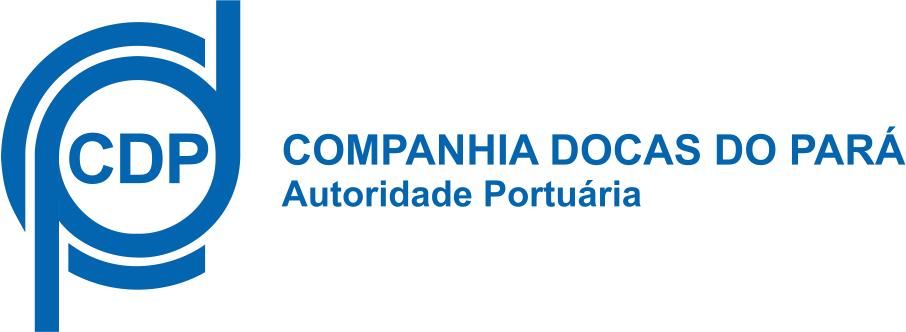
- Company type: Sociedade Anônima
- Industry: Port authority
- Founded: 31 December 1967; 58 years ago
- Headquarters: Belém, Brazil
- Area served: Pará
- Website: www.cdp.com.br

The Companhia Docas do Pará, commonly shortened CDP, is a company that manages the ports of the state of Pará. Founded in 1967, it has been a joint-stock company since 1969, with the Federal Government of Brazil as its majority shareholder.

The company manages and commercially exploits the ports and other port facilities in Pará.

In addition to its corporate activities, it also controls the Eastern Amazon waterways: the Teles Pires-Tapajós and the Tocantins-Araguaia Waterway.
