= Antonio Landi =

Italian poet, writer and dramatist

Antonio Landi (1725–1783) was an Italian poet, writer and dramatist of some importance in the European literary, cultural and theatrical scene.

He was a counselor of the Court in Berlin and was the author of a summary in French of the monumental History of Italian literature of Girolamo Tiraboschi.

== Biography ==
He born in Livorno in 1725 and appointed an abbot in 1765. He preached in the collegiate church of Andrew the Apostle in Empoli, but his "immoral" lifestyle won him a rebuke from the Church, and he eventually abandoned the cassock.

He then moved to Berlin in the service of the emperor Frederick II of Prussia, on the recommendation of the Grand Duke of Tuscany, with the task of composing and adapting stage works for its theater. He also became a court counselor.

At the court in Berlin he was the author of librettos, plays and some historical and literary works such as the Histoire de la littérature d'Italie, an abridged French translation of Tiraboschi, and a history of the Saxon emperors, published in German. He died in Berlin in 1783.

== Works ==
=== Plays ===
- L’Aspasia. tragedia d’Inanto Lanido Acc. Ap. All’illustriss. Signora Victoria Gaetani Borgherini, Florence, Anton Giuseppe Pagani, 1761
- Il Rodrigo tragedia dell'abate Antonio Landi fiorentino dedicata al merito singolare dell'illustriss. signore Giuseppe Riccardi patrizio fiorentino de' marchesi di Chianni, Rivalto, Montevaso, and Apple, Florence, Stamperia Imperiale, 1765
- Amore e Psyche, Berlin, 1767;
- Orestes e Pilade, Berlin, Haude und Spener, 1771;
- Orestes e Pilade, Berlin, Haude und Spener, 1786;
- I Greci in Tauride, Berlin, Haude und Spener, 1772;
- Vorspiel nel Britannico, Berlin, 1772;
- Angelica e Medoro, Berlin, Haude und Spener, 1776;
- Il Rodrigo tragedia dell’abbate Antonio Landi fiorentino, Naples, Per il Flauto Regio Impressore, 1776;

=== Literary and historical works ===
- Raccolta di poesie teatrali dell’abate Antonio Landi, Florence, Domenico Marzi e Compagni, 1771
- Des Herrn Abt AL ... Regierungsgeschichte der Fürsten aus dem alten Hause Sachsen, in den Königreichen Italien und Teutschland und in dem Kaiserthume. Aus der Italienischen Handschrift übersetzt von J.A. Mebes, Berlin, 1784;
- Histoire de la littérature d'Italie, tirée de l'italien de Mr. Tiraboschi, et abregée par Antoine Landi, Bern, 1784;

=== Translations ===
- Storia della letteratura italiana del cavaliere abate Girolamo Tiraboschi compendiata in lingua francese da Antonio Landi ... ed ora tradotta in lingua italiana dal p. G.A.M. ... con annotazioni sopra tutti gl'italiani traduttori de' classici autori latini ec. ec. Venice, Adolfo Cesare e Antonio Rosa, 1801-1805.

== Other sources ==
- Biographical Index Italian (IBI) by Tommaso Nappo - Paul Noto, III, Monaco - London - New York - Parigu, KG Saur, 1993, p. 803
- Compositions poetry in praise of the very lapels. Mr Abbot Antonio Landi Florentine Lent in the year 1765 with great applause preached nell'insigne Collegiate of St. Andrew of the land of Empoli , Florence, Imperial Printing House, 1765;
- Jocher Christian Gottlieb, Landi (Anton ), say in Allgemeines Gelehrten-Lexicon. Adelung , Johann Christoph (from Bd. 3 Rotermund, Heinrich Wilhelm), III, Leipzig - Delmenhorst - Bremen, Johann Friedrich In Gledischens Handlung, 1810, p. 156;
- Gaetano Melzi, INANTO LANIDO , say in Dictionary of anonymous and pseudonymous writers or Italian as it is with regard to Italy Gaetano Melzi , II, Milan, Arnaldo Forni Editore, 1852, p . 26;
- Natali Giulio, Literary history of Italy , I, Milan, Vallardi Publishing House, 1973, pp. 50; 386-387;
- Amos Parducci, The Italian classic tragedy of the eighteenth century: Front Alfieri , Rocca San Casciano, Licinio Cappelli, 1902, pp. 269; 294; 354;
- Pera Francesco, Memoirs and biographies Livorno , Livorno, Vigo, 1867, p.220;
- Claudio Sartori, The books printed from its origins to 1800. Catalog analytical indexes with 16 , Indexes I, Cuneo, Bertola & Locatelli Publishers, p. 278;
- Carlo Schmidl, Antonio Landi , say in Universal Dictionary of the musicians . By Carlo Schmidl, IIa, Milan, Sonzogno, 1938, p. 445.
