= Tapajó people =

Ethnic group of Brazil

The Tapajós, are an Indigenous Brazilian people, who, in the 17th century, lived in the area around where the Tapajós flowed into the Amazon River, in the Brazilian state of Amazonas. In the 1930s, anthropologist Helen Palmatary published important research on their ceramics. In 2020, there were 241 of them.

The Tapajós are named after the Tapajós river. The lower Tapajós river were the center of the Santarém Culture, also known as Tapajônica culture. Modern reproductions of the culture's pottery is still reproduced in the city of Santarém to preserve the culture.
