= Boulevard Castilhos França =

Street in Pará, Brazil

Coordinates: 1.4508°S 48.5018°W

- Rua Nova do Imperador; Boulevard da República
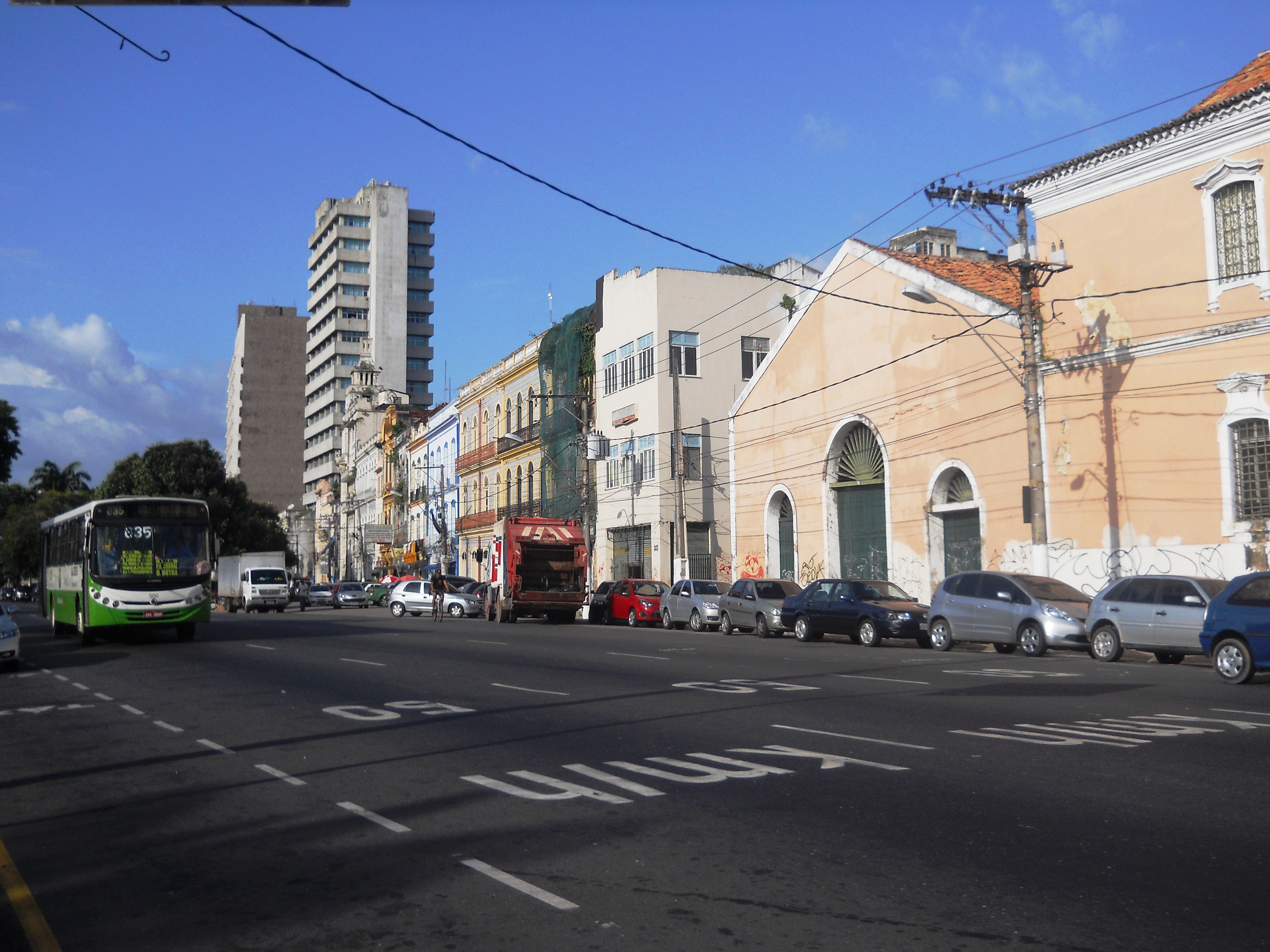
- The avenue passes behind the Church of Our Lady of Mercy and in front of the Estação das Docas.
- Interactive map of Boulevard Castilhos França
- Location: Belém, Pará; Brazil

Boulevard Castilhos França, originally called Rua Nova do Imperador and Boulevard da República, is a street located in the Campina neighborhood, on the shores of Guajará Bay, in the Brazilian city of Belém, capital of the state of Pará. Created in 1848, it is one of Belém's first wide thoroughfares. In 1930, it was renamed Boulevard Castilhos França in honor of Navy Commander Eurico de Castilhos França.

== History ==
Boulevard Castilhos França is one of the first broad roads in the city of Belém. It started with the landfill of the Guajará Bay beach area, located next to the commercial customs house, and incorporated Art Nouveau elements. The works evolved from the enrichment of Belém during the golden age of rubber in the Amazon. At the end of the 19th century, during the Belle Époque period, urban interventions modernized the features of the street to reflect the new elite 's desire to appear progressive and connected in the European style. It had to overcome colonial standards with technical urbanism, applying hygienic and social control measures and distancing the poor from the urban limits.

At the time, the site featured constructions lined only on the left side and a series of wharves located on the shores of Guajará Bay, which became established after navigation opened up in the Amazon RIver. Boulevard Castilhos França is approximately 756.18 meter long. It starts at the old 15 de Agosto Lane, now Presidente Vargas Avenue, at 17 meters wide, and ends at the Companhia Lane, now Portugal Avenue, with a width of 10.67 meters.

=== Historical heritage ===
Boulevard Castilhos França integrates the architectural and landscape complex of Ver-o-Peso, listed by National Institute of Historic and Artistic Heritage (IPHAN) in 1977, which covers an area of 35,000 square meters and includes several historic buildings, including the Francisco Bolonha Municipal Meat Market, the Siqueira Campos Square, the Dock, the Açaí Fair, the Castle Slope and the Solar da Beira, the Estação das Docas and the Fisherman's Square.

== See also ==
- Culture and tourism in Belém
