= Girolamo Tiraboschi =

Italian literary critic (1731–1794)

Reverend Girolamo Tiraboschi S.J.
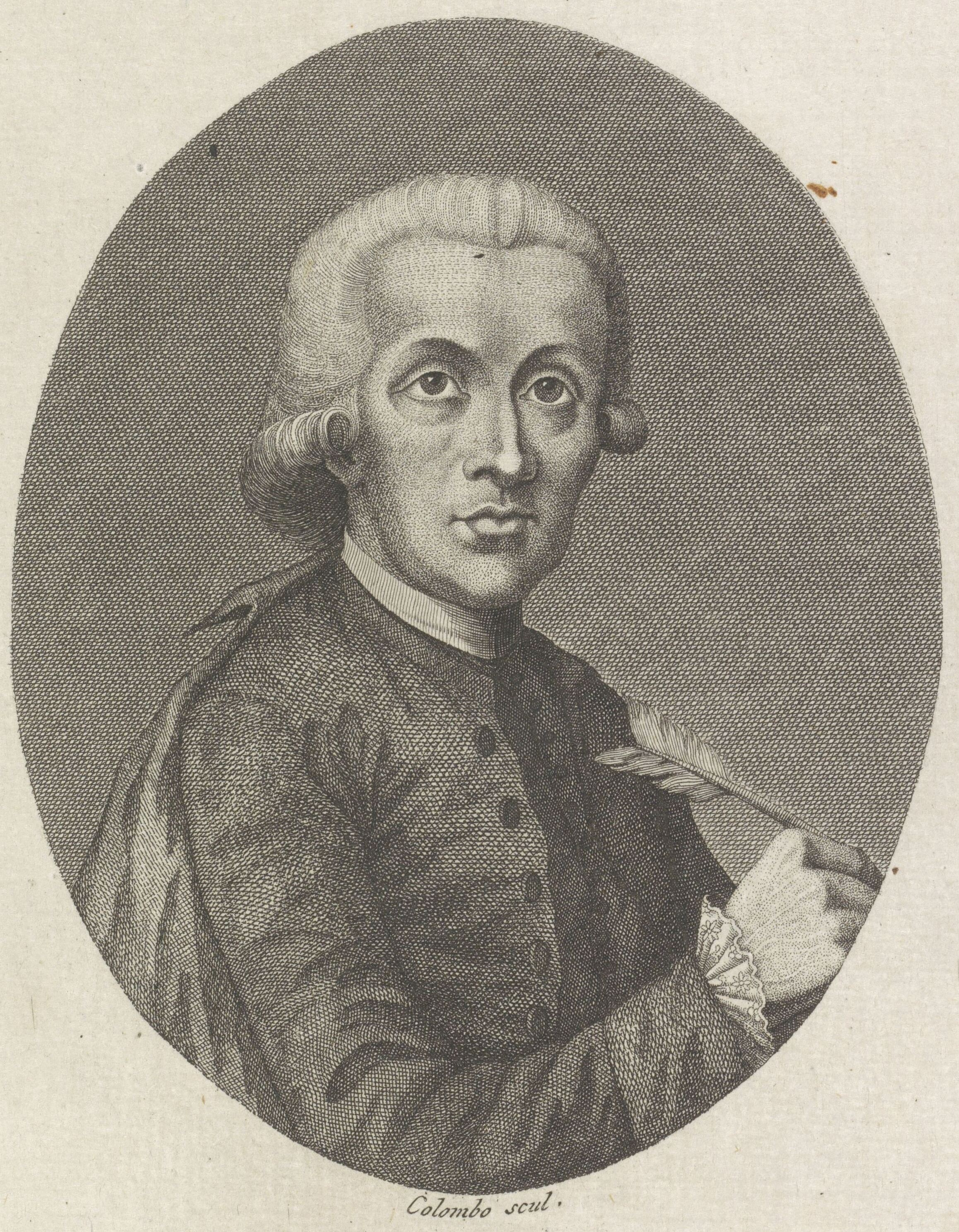
- Girolamo Tiraboschi
- Born: December 18, 1731; Bergamo, Republic of Venice
- Died: 9 June 1794 (aged 62); Modena, Duchy of Modena and Reggio
- Occupations: Catholic priest, librarian, historian, writer
- Known for: Storia della letteratura italiana
- Title: abbot
- Parent(s): Vincenzo Tiraboschi and Laura Tiraboschi

Academic work
- Discipline: History of literature, Medieval history
- Institutions: Jesuit Brera College (Milan); Biblioteca Estense

Signature
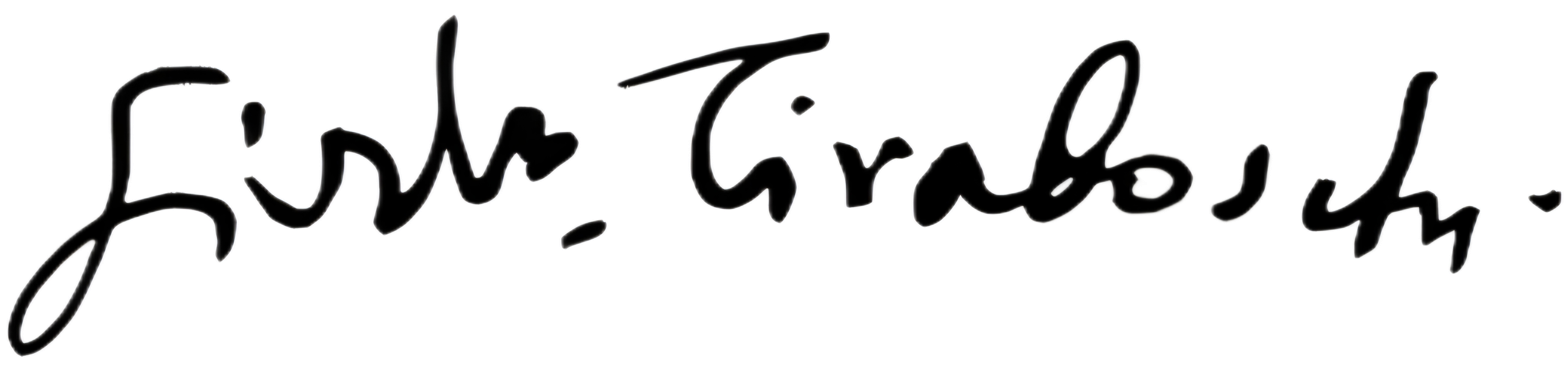

Girolamo Tiraboschi S.J. (Italian: [dʒiˈrɔːlamo tiraˈbɔski, -bos-]; 18 December 1731 – 9 June 1794) was an Italian literary critic, the first historian of Italian literature.

== Biography ==
Born in Bergamo, he studied at the Jesuit college in Monza, entered the order, and was appointed in 1755 professor of eloquence in the University of Milan. There, he produced (1766–1768) Vetera humiliatorum monumenta (3 vols), a history of the extinct order of the Humiliati, which made his literary reputation.

Nominated in 1770 as librarian to Francis III, duke of Modena, he turned to account the copious materials there accumulated for the composition of his Storia della letteratura italiana. This vast work, in which Italian literature from the time of the Etruscans to the end of the 17th century is traced in detail, occupied eleven years, 1771–1782, and the thirteen quarto volumes embodying it appeared successively in Modena during that period.

A second enlarged edition (16 vols) was issued from 1787 to 1794, and was succeeded by many others, besides abridgments in German, French and English. Tiraboschi died in Modena on 3 June 1794, leaving a high reputation for virtue, learning and piety.

Tiraboschi also wrote, among many other works:

- Biblioteca modenese (6 vols, 1781–1786)
- Notizie de' pittori, scultori, incisori, ed architetti modenesi. Modena: Societa Tipografica. 1786.
- Memorie storiche modenesi (5 vols, 1793–1794)

He edited the Nuovo giornale dei letterati d'Italia (1773–1790), and left materials for a work of great research entitled Dizionario topografico-storico degli stati estensi (2 vols, 1824–1825),

== Selected publications ==
- De patriae historia, Milano 1760;
- Girolamo Tiraboschi (1766–1768), Vetera Humiliatorum monumenta annotationibus ac dìssertationibus prodromis illustrata, Three volumes., Mediolani (Milan): excudebat J. Galeatius, regius typographus, OCLC 7427083, OL 6283625M;
- Storia della letteratura italiana, Modena, I edizione in 13 volumi, 1772–1782; II ed. rivista e ampliata, in 15 volumi, più un sedicesimo che contiene l'indice generale, 1787–1794);
- Vita del Conte D. Fulvio Testi, Modena, 1780;
- Girolamo Tiraboschi (1781), Biblioteca modenese ovvero notizie della vita e delle opere degli scrittori nati negli stati del duca di Modena, Volume 6., In Modena: Società tipografica, OL 23384362M;
- Biblioteca Modenese, 1781–1786 ;
- Notizie biografiche e letterarie in continuazione della Biblioteca modonese, Reggio, 1796 (on-line);
- Girolamo Tiraboschi, Translated from Latin by Cosimo Bartoli (1804), Della pittura e della statua di Leonbatista Alberti (Paintings and Statues by Leon Battista Alberti. ed.), Milano: Società tip. de'Classici italiani, OCLC 3427694, OL 6606090M;
- Storia dell'augusta abbazia di San Silvestro dì Nonantola, aggiuntovi il Codice Diplomatico della medesima illustrato con note, 2 volumi, Modena, 1784–1789;
- Notizie de' pittori, scultori, incisori, architetti natii degli stati del duca di Modena, Modena, 1786;
- Girolamo Tirabasochi (1894), Carteggio fra l'ab. Girolamo Tiraboschi e l'avv. Eustachio Cabassi (Carteggio fra l'ab. Girolamo Tiraboschi e l'avv. Eustachio Cabassi. ed.), Carpi: Rossi G. fu Dionigi, OL 17981498M;
- Notizie della Confraternita di San Pietro Martire in Modena, Modena, 1789;
- Riflessioni sugli Scrittori Genealogici, Padova 1789;
- Dell'origine della poesia rimata, opera di Giammaria Barbieri modenese, pubblicata e con annotazioni illustrata dal cav. ab. Girolamo Tiraboschi, Modena 1790;
- Memorie storiche modenesi col Codice Diplomatico illustrato con note, 3 volumi, Modena, 1793–1795;
- Dizionario topografico storico degli stati estensi, Modena, 1824–1825 (postumo).

== Notes ==
Attribution

- Ford, J.D.M. (1913). "Girolamo Tiraboschi" . In Herbermann, Charles (ed.). Catholic Encyclopedia. New York: Robert Appleton Company.
