= List of IPHAN heritage sites in the North of Brazil =

The National Institute of Historic and Artistic Heritage (Portuguese: Instituto do Patrimônio Histórico e Artístico Nacional - IPHAN) is a Brazilian government agency linked to the Ministry of Culture and created in 1937 to preserve, publicize, inspect and enact the legal protection of Brazil's patrimony. In the North, there are material assets and urban complexes formed as a result of different historical and cultural contexts, but derived from the exploitation of the Amazon's natural resources, such as: the rubber cycle, which transformed the region into an important economic hub for Brazil in the 19th century and originated the architectural and artistic patrimony of Manaus and Belém; the gold cycle and the expeditions of the bandeirantes from São Paulo in the 18th and 19th centuries, leading to settlements in the current state of Tocantins, such as Natividade and Porto Nacional; the expansion of the mineral extraction industry in the 20th century, which led to the creation of projects such as Vila Serra do Navio, in Amapá; and deforestation and activism in favor of forest preservation.

Between 1938 and 2018, IPHAN registered 39 sites in the North of Brazil, including historic buildings, city centers and landscapes. Entities listed by IPHAN are organized under the Livros do Tombo, which is organized into 4 categories: Arqueológico, Etnográfico e Paisagístico (English: Archaeological, Ethnographic and Landscape), Histórico (Historic), Belas Artes (Fine Arts) e Artes Aplicadas (Applied Arts).

== Registered heritage sites ==
=== Acre ===
Xapuri
Image	Name	Year of inclusion	Type	Livro do Tombo	Information
	House of Chico Mendes (Casa de Chico Mendes) and its collection	2011	Building and collection	Histórico	Historic house where environmentalist Chico Mendes lived and was murdered. Since the late 1990s, it has housed a memorial room in his honor.

=== Amapá ===
Macapá
Image	Name	Year of inclusion	Type	Livro do Tombo	Information
	Fortress of São José de Macapá (Fortaleza de São José de Macapá)	1950	Building	Histórico	One of the main military buildings in Brazil and one of the most important monuments of the 18th century. It was built between 1764 and 1782 by the engineer Henrique Antônio Gallúcio.
Serra do Navio
Image	Name	Year of inclusion	Type	Livro do Tombo	Information
	Vila Serra do Navio	2012	Urban complex	Arqueológico, Etnográfico e Paisagístico; Histórico; Belas Artes	Built between the late 1950s and early 1960s and designed by Oswaldo Arthur Bratke to house the residents of the Workers' Village of the Indústria e Comércio de Minério (Icomi).

=== Amazonas ===
Manaus
Image	Name	Year of inclusion	Type	Livro do Tombo	Information
	Reservoir of Mocó (Reservatório do Mocó)	1985	Urban infrastructure or equipment	Histórico; Belas Artes	A Neo-Renaissance style structure inaugurated in 1899 during the rubber cycle. The internal design supports two metal tanks. It still supplies part of the city of Manaus.
	Architectural and landscape complex of the Port of Manaus	1987	Urban complex	Arqueológico, Etnográfico e Paisagístico; Belas Artes	The complex began to be built at the beginning of the 20th century to transport rubber production. The registry also covers the Public Treasury Building, the Princesa Isabel Pier (Trapiche Princesa Isabel) and the fire pump.
	Adolpho Lisboa Market (Mercado Adolpho Lisboa) or Municipal Market (Mercado Municipal)	1987	Urban complex	Histórico; Belas Artes	Located next to the Negro River, the market began to be built in 1880 by Bakus & Brisbin and opened in 1883. There is a carving on the flag of the main gate with the name Adolpho Lisboa, who was mayor of Manaus at the time.
	Amazonas Theatre (Teatro Amazonas)	1966	Building	Histórico	A symbol of the prosperity of Amazonas during the rubber cycle, the theater began construction in 1884 and opened in 1896. The architectural project is by the Portuguese Engineering and Architecture Office of Lisbon.

=== Pará ===
Belém
Image	Name	Year of inclusion	Type	Livro do Tombo	Information
	Lauro Sodré Palace (Palácio Lauro Sodré) or Government Palace (Palácio do Governo)	1974	Building	Histórico; Belas Artes	The palace dates from the late 18th century and was designed by architect Giuseppe Landi in the classical Italian style. It has an internal chapel with a baroque altarpiece from where the procession of the first Círio de Nazaré left on September 8, 1797. It currently houses the Pará State Museum (Museu do Estado do Pará).
	Nazaré Avenue (Avenida Nazaré): architectural complex	1985	Urban complex	Belas Artes	The occupation of the Nazaré neighborhood dates back to the second half of the 18th century when a chapel dedicated to Our Lady of Nazareth was built, which led to the emergence of the Círio de Nazaré. Several buildings along Nazaré Avenue have been listed, such as the Baron of Guamá Palace (Palacete do Barão de Guamá), the Baron of Japuri's Manor House (Solar do Barão de Japuri) and the College of Our Lady of Nazareth (Colégio de Nossa Senhora de Nazaré).
	Our Lady of Solitude Cemetery (Cemitério de Nossa Senhora da Soledade)	1964	Urban complex	Arqueológico, Etnográfico e Paisagístico	Inaugurated in 1850, the cemetery was established due to a yellow fever epidemic in the region in the mid-19th century. The Chapel of Our Lady of Solitude (Capela de Nossa Senhora da Soledade) was built by Captain Joaquim Vitorino de Sousa Cabral in a neoclassical style with English iron railings. Used as a burial place for Pará's elite, the cemetery has several important funerary monuments, including the tomb of General Hilário Maximiliano Antunes Gurjão, built in Brescia, Italy.
	Archaeological and ethnographic collection of the Emílio Goeldi Museum of Pará (Museu Paraense Emílio Goeldi)	1940	Collection	Arqueológico, Etnográfico e Paisagístico	Founded in 1866 by Domingos Soares Ferreira Penna, a naturalist from Minas Gerais, the museum has an extensive collection of natural sciences and anthropology, characterized by a focus on the Amazon region. The conservation status includes the archaeological collections, which comprise 2,746 pieces of ceramics and more than a million fragments.
	Architectural complex of the Cidade Velha and Campina neighborhoods	2012	Urban complex	Arqueológico, Etnográfico e Paisagístico; Histórico	The complex of Cidade Velha and Campina neighborhoods, founded at the beginning of the 17th century, forms the historic center of Belém. The protection covers around 2,800 buildings, including palaces, mansions and mansions with commercial establishments on the first floor.
	Architectural and landscape complex of Ver-o-Peso and surrounding areas	1977	Urban complex	Arqueológico, Etnográfico e Paisagístico; Belas Artes	An architectural complex built in the 18th century around the old Casa de Ver-o-Peso, a tax office responsible for collecting taxes on different goods imported into the captaincies. Construction of the current Ver-o-Peso Market began in 1899 and consisted of an iron structure brought from Europe covered in Marseille tiles and art nouveau towers with a zinc scale roof. The registry includes the Meat Market (Mercado de Carne), the Fish Market (Mercado de Peixe), Castilho França Boulevard (Boulevard Castilho França), Dom Pedro II Square (Praça Pedro II) and sections of Portugal Avenue (Avenida Portugal), Marquês de Pombal Street (Rua Marquês de Pombal) and Clock Square (Praça do Relógio).
	Architectural, urban and landscape complex of Dom Frei Caetano Brandão Square (Praça Dom Frei Caetano Brandão), formerly Largo da Sé	1964	Urban complex	Arqueológico, Etnográfico e Paisagístico; Histórico	Located next to the shore of Guajará Bay, the square represents Belém's initial settlement. The Cidade Velha and Campina (now Comércio) neighborhoods, which constitute the historic center, originated and consolidated around it.
	Architectural complexes on Governador José Malcher Avenue (Avenida Governador José Malcher) and Rui Barbosa Lane (Travessa Rui Barbosa)	1985	Urban complex	Belas Artes	A complex of structures built in the 19th century in neoclassical style, influenced by the Portuguese-Brazilian tradition, expressed mainly in the use of tiles on the facades.
	Convent and Church of Our Lady of Mercy (Convento e Igreja de Nossa Senhora das Mercês)	1941	Building and collection	Histórico	The church, erected in brick masonry, was inaugurated in 1777 to replace the original chapel, dated 1640. The architectural design by Giuseppe Landi is notable for its originality, as one of the few Brazilian churches to have a convex facade and a pediment with wavy lines. After the expulsion of the Mercedarian order from the Province of Pará in 1794, the temple served different civilian and military uses, including as a shelter for insurgents during the Cabanagem.
	Convent and Church of Our Lady of Mount Carmel (Convento e Igreja de Nossa Senhora do Carmo)	1941	Building and collection	Histórico	Construction of the church began in 1690 on the same site as the original chapel, erected by the Carmelite order in 1627. The congregation also erected the Chapel of Our Lord of the Steps (Capela do Senhor dos Passos), inserted in the same architectural complex. In 1766, the church was expanded according to a design by Giuseppe Landi.
	Palace of the Eleven Windows (Palacete das Onze Janelas), former Royal Military Hospital (Hospital Real Militar)	1964	Building	Histórico	The building designed by Giuseppe Landi in the second half of the 18th century was adapted from a property bought in 1770 from Domingos da Costa de Bacelar to house the Military Hospital. It underwent modifications throughout the 19th century, when it received the triangular pediment on the main facade. It functioned as a hospital until 1938. Since 2002, the space houses a contemporary art museum, along with a restaurant and a multicultural area.
	Murutucu Mill (Engenho Murutucu): ruins and Chapel of Our Lady of the Conception (Capela de Nossa Senhora da Conceição)	1981	Ruin	Histórico	The mill was built in the 18th century by João Manuel Rodrigues and was considered one of the best and best equipped in Pará. When the sugar trade declined, the complex was abandoned and fell into ruin in the mid-19th century. The chapel was built in 1711 by the Mercedarian friars and restored in the second half of the 18th century by Giuseppe Landi. It is the only standing structure in the complex.
	Presépio Fort (Forte do Presépio)	1962	Building	Histórico	Founded in 1616 by Francisco Caldeira Castelo Branco at the confluence of the Guamá River and Guajará Bay, the fort is considered the initial point of occupation at the mouth of the Pará River. After several renovations in the 18th century, it was semi-destroyed in 1835 during the Cabanagem. After several military uses of the fortification and architectural modifications, it underwent restoration and was adapted for museum use in the early 2000s.
	Metropolitan Cathedral of Belém (Catedral Metropolitana de Belém)	1941	Building and collection	Histórico	The original chapel was built in 1616 next to the Presépio Fort by Francisco Caldeira Castelo Branco and later transferred to the current location. Construction of the present temple began in 1748. It opened unfinished in 1755 and Giuseppe Landi concluded the work in 1774. The interior is richly adorned with Baroque carvings, ancient images, a marble high altar, alabaster and works by Domenico de Angelis, Alexandrino de Carvalho and Silvério Caporini.
	Church of Our Lady of the Rosary (Igreja de Nossa Senhora do Rosário)	1950	Building and collection	Histórico; Belas Artes	The original chapel was built in the second half of the 17th century by slaves devoted to Our Lady of the Rosary. In 1725, due to its poor state of preservation, the chapel was demolished and replaced by the current church, designed by architect Giuseppe Landi. The interior is adorned with solid silver candlesticks and lanterns, as well as rare manuscripts, paintings and sculptures.
	Church of Saint Anne (Igreja de Santana)	1962	Building and collection	Belas Artes	Built in 1761 to replace the old chapel, the church was designed by Giuseppe Landi with neoclassical features. Highlights include the cross-shaped nave, the decoration of floral paintings on the ceiling, the marble cladding of the chancel and altar walls and the ogival vault crowned by a dome. It houses an image of Saint Peter, an ancient replica of the Roman original.
	Church and Former College of Saint Alexander (Igreja e Colégio de Santo Alexandre)	1941	Architectural complex	Histórico	The original chapel and the first college were built in 1616 by Jesuit missionaries. The current architectural complex dates back to 1719 and was constructed on the same site by order of Manuel de Brito; the decoration of the facades finished in 1731. The original painted ceiling disappeared during a renovation. The interior decoration features a Portuguese silver lamp from the 18th century with the coat of arms of the Carmelites.
	Church of Saint John the Baptist (Igreja de São João Batista)	1941	Building and collection	Histórico	Designed by Giuseppe Landi, the church was built between 1771 and 1774 on the same site where the original chapel stood in 1622. The octagonal nave covered by a dome stands out. The interior is decorated with trompe-l'œil perspective paintings restored in the 1980s.
	Antônio Lemos Palace (Palácio Antônio Lemos)	1942	Building	Histórico; Belas Artes	Headquarters of Belém City Hall, the building was designed in 1860 by José da Gama Abreu in the late neoclassical style. Afterwards, it was enlarged and modified by Giuseppe Landi. Giovanni Capranesi, Domenico de Angelis and Teodoro Braga decorated the interior at the beginning of the 20th century under the direction of Governor Antonio Lemos. In 1992, a restoration eliminated Landi's modifications and reinstated the building's original design.
	Pinho Mansion (Palacete Pinho)	1986	Building	Histórico; Belas Artes	Built at the end of the 19th century to house the family of Commander José de Pinho, the mansion is a representative example of the luxury residences that emerged in Belém during the economic heyday of the rubber cycle. The mansion has a U-shaped floor plan with an open courtyard and an eclectic style, combining Baroque influences and elements from 16th-century Italian palaces.
	Old Palace (Palácio Velho)	1944	Building	Histórico; Belas Artes	Originally inaugurated in 1680, the building was demolished in 1759 due to the poor state of conservation. It was rebuilt in 1767 according to a design by Giuseppe Landi. It has two floors, a central chamber and a facade with arched doors and windows.
	Zoobotanical Park of the Emílio Goeldi Museum of Pará (Parque Zoobotânico do Museu Paraense Emílio Goeldi)	1994	Historic garden	Arqueológico, Etnográfico e Paisagístico; Histórico	Designed by Emílio Augusto Goeldi, the park was established in 1895 to serve as a garden and zoo for the Emílio Goeldi Museum of Pará. It has undergone several renovations and extensions and used to house around 2,500 specimens of different animals in an area of 5.2 hectares.
	Baron of Guajará Manor House (Solar Barão de Guajará)	1950	Building	Histórico; Belas Artes	A Portuguese-inspired building with a tiled facade. The interior has a refined style and an internal courtyard of Moorish influence. It currently houses the Historic and Geographic Institute of Pará (Instituto Histórico e Geográfico do Pará) and the library of Domingos Antônio Raiol, the Baron of Guajará, former owner of the residence.
	Peace Theater (Theatro da Paz)	1963	Building	Histórico	Designed by José Tibúrcio Pereira Magalhães, the theater was built between 1874 and 1878. Over the following decades, renovations altered the neoclassical style of the facade in favor of eclecticism. The interior is adorned by the ceiling panel depicting Apollo, painted by Domenico de Angelis, and the foyer decorated with regional motifs.
Gurupá
Image	Name	Year of inclusion	Type	Livro do Tombo	Information
	Fort of Santo Antônio do Gurupá (Forte de Santo Antônio de Gurupá)	1963	Building	Histórico	Fort was founded by Bento Maciel Parente after the expulsion of the Dutch in 1623. It suffered several attacks between 1629 and 1639 and fell into ruins. It was rebuilt and enlarged by Governor Antônio de Albuquerque Coelho de Carvalho in 1690, but was abandoned again. Only the stone wall, a house and part of the polygonal fortification remain from its last reconstruction.
Vigia
Image	Name	Year of inclusion	Type	Livro do Tombo	Information
	Mother of God Church (Igreja da Madre de Deus)	1954	Building and collection	Belas Artes	Founded in 1731 by the Jesuits, the College of the Mother of God (Colégio da Mãe de Deus) was transformed into a temple in 1733. The building stands out for the sumptuousness of the internal decoration. It preserves the original construction lines and part of the sacred collection, including the canvases depicting the life of the Mother of God and the 18th-century image of Christ.

=== Rondônia ===
Costa Marques
Image	Name	Year of inclusion	Type	Livro do Tombo	Information
	Fort Príncipe da Beira (Forte Príncipe da Beira)	1950	Building	Histórico	Erected in the 18th century, the fort is one of the largest fortifications in Brazil. It was rebuilt between 1776 and 1783 using a project attributed to the engineers Domingos Sambucetti and Ricardo Franco de Almeida Serra. It has a quadrangular floor plan, stone walls and 14 large buildings made of stone and mortar, originally intended to house the garrison barracks and the chapel.
Ji-Paraná
Image	Name	Year of inclusion	Type	Livro do Tombo	Information
	Telegraph station buildings built by the Strategic Commission for Telegraph Lines from Cuiabá to Porto Velho (Rondon Commission)	2016	Building	Histórico	Remnants of the federal telegraph lines created at the beginning of the 20th century during the Rondon Commission, which aimed to integrate the national territory and allow faster communication between Brazil's regions. The old Ji-Paraná Station, formerly part of the telegraph line that connected the cities of Cuiabá and Porto Velho, now houses the Communications Museum (Museu das Comunicações).
Porto Velho
Image	Name	Year of inclusion	Type	Livro do Tombo	Information
	Madeira-Mamoré Railway (Estrada de Ferro Madeira-Mamoré) yard	2008	Architectural complex	Arqueológico, Etnográfico e Paisagístico; Histórico	Built between 1907 and 1912, the Madeira-Mamoré Railway aimed to consolidate the borders and insert the North of Brazil into national economic development strategies. The railroad also marked the emergence of the city of Porto Velho, the capital of Rondônia, which was established to support the construction of the line.
Vilhena
Image	Name	Year of inclusion	Type	Livro do Tombo	Information
	Telegraph station buildings built by the Strategic Commission for Telegraph Lines from Cuiabá to Porto Velho (Rondon Commission)	2016	Building	Histórico	Remnants of the federal telegraph lines created at the beginning of the 20th century during the Rondon Commission, which aimed to integrate the national territory and allow faster communication between Brazil's regions. The old Vilhena Station belonged to the telegraph line that connected the cities of Cuiabá and Porto Velho.

=== Tocantins ===
Natividade
Image	Name	Year of inclusion	Type	Livro do Tombo	Information
	Architectural, urban and landscape complex of Natividade	1987	Urban complex	Arqueológico, Etnográfico e Paisagístico; Histórico; Belas Artes	Founded in 1734 by Antônio Ferraz de Araújo as Arraial de São Luís, the town of Natividade emerged because of the expansion of mining activity in the Central-West. The registry includes several monuments and buildings.
Porto Nacional
Image	Name	Year of inclusion	Type	Livro do Tombo	Information
	Historic center of Porto Nacional	2011	Urban complex	Histórico	Urban center founded in the early 19th century during the gold rush. The protected area covers the central zone of the municipality, including the natural landscape, the urban structure and the constructions installed from its foundation until the 1960s. Approximately 250 buildings, sets of streets, avenues, squares and plazas are registered. Highlights include the Cathedral of Our Lady of Mercy (Catedral Nossa Senhora das Mercês), the Curia, the Seminary of Saint Joseph (Seminário São José), the building of the Historical and Cultural Museum of Porto Nacional (Museu Histórico e Cultural de Porto Nacional) and the Chamber House and Jail (Casa de Câmara e Cadeia).

== Heritage sites in process of registration ==
Acre
Image	City	Name	Opening of the case	Type	Process status (2018)	Information
	Rio Branco	Historic center of Rio Branco	2016	Urban complex	Instruction	The historic center of Rio Branco features a large collection of vernacular wooden architecture, and buildings with eclectic designs and art deco influences. IPHAN, in partnership with the Acre State Government and Rio Branco City Hall, is conducting a study of the constructions in the area that are eligible for federal protection.
	Various	Geoglyphs of Acre	2014	Archaeological site	Pending	Acre's geoglyphs are earthen structures dug into the ground formed by ditches and walls that represent geometric figures of different shapes. They are located throughout several municipalities, covering areas of interfluves, stream springs and floodplains, mostly associated with the Acre and Iquiri rivers. It is estimated that the geoglyphs were made by the pre-colonial indigenous societies that inhabited the eastern part of the state between 200 BC and 1300 AD.
Amazonas
Image	City	Name	Opening of the case	Type	Process status (2018)	Information
	Manaus	Historic center of Manaus	2010	Urban complex	Pending	Founded in 1669 on the left bank of the Negro River, the city of Manaus preserves a significant architectural collection dating back to the end of the 19th century. Its heritage inscription was approved by IPHAN, but registration in the Livro do Tombo Arqueológico, Etnográfico e Paisagístico and the Livro do Tombo Histórico is pending.
	Manaus	Set of buildings of the Companhia de Saneamento do Amazonas (COSAMA)	1996	Urban complex	Instruction	
	Manaus	Meeting of Waters	2010	Natural heritage	Pending	The waters of the Negro and Solimões rivers meet at Manaus and continue to flow parallel for more than six kilometers. The heritage inscription was approved by IPHAN, but registration in the Livro do Tombo Arqueológico, Etnográfico e Paisagístico and the Livro do Tombo Histórico is pending.
	Novo Airão	Ruins of Velho Airão	1995	Ruin	Instruction	Founded in 1694, Velho Airão was the first settlement on the banks of the Negro River. It became one of the most important urban centers in the area, and grew exponentially during the rubber cycle. After the end of the World War II and the consequent decline in international demand for latex, Velho Airão collapsed and was gradually abandoned from the 1950s onwards.

== See also ==
- List of National Historic Heritage sites of Brazil
- List of World Heritage Sites in Brazil
