= Timeline of Belém =

The following is a timeline of the history of the city of Belém, in the state of Pará, Brazil.

== Prior to 18th century ==
- 1616 – The Fort of Presépio (Forte do Presépio de Belém) established by Portuguese.
- 1625 – Casa de Haver o Peso (tax office) in operation.

== 18th century ==
- 1719 – The Jesuits build the Church and Former College of Saint Alexander.
- 1720 – Roman Catholic diocese of Belém do Pará established.
- 1753 – The Boundary Commission (Comissão de Limites) arrives under the command of governor and captain general Francisco Xavier de Mendonça Furtado, brother of the powerful Sebastião José de Carvalho e Melo, 1st Marquis of Pombal; it includes the Italian architect and naturalist Giuseppe Antonio Landi.
- 1763 – The Church and Convent of Mercy completed.
- 1769 – The House of the Eleven Windows, a hospital, opens.
- 1772 – Governor’s Palace, designed by Antonio Landi, completed.
- 1777 – Igreja de São João Batista, designed by Antonio Landi, consecrated.
- 1782
  - Completion of the Church of Saint Anne (Belém), designed by Antonio Landi.
  - Construction of Our Lady of Grace Cathedral completed.

== 19th century ==
- 1822 – O Paraense newspaper begins publication.
- 1827 – A Voz das Amazonas newspaper begins publication.
- 1829 – O Sagitário newspaper begins publication.
- 1835 – Cabanagem separatist revolt begins.
- 1840 – Cabanagem separatist revolt ends.
- 1841 – Liceu Paraense (school) founded.
- 1866 – Museu Paraense (museum) founded.
- 1867 – Mercado Municipal de Carnes (market) built.
- 1868 – Palácio da Câmara Municipal e Prefeitura built.
- 1872
  - Instituto Paraense de Educandos Artífices established.
  - Population: 61,997.
- 1876 – A Província do Pará newspaper begins publication.
- 1878 – Theatro da Paz (theatre) opens.
- 1879 – Amazon rubber boom begins.
- 1883 – Palácio Municipal built.
- 1891 – José Coelho da Gama becomes mayor.
- 1896 – Folha do Norte begins publication.
- 1900
  - Historic and Geographic Institute of Pará and Academia Paraense de Letras (learned societies) founded.
  - Population: 96,560.

== 20th century ==
- 1901 – Mercado Ver-o-Peso, street market and fair opens.
- 1905 – Grupo do Remo (football club) founded.
- 1909 – Basilica of Our Lady of Nazareth of Exile construction begins.
- 1911 – São Brás Market built.
- 1912 – Cine Olympia (cinema) opens.
- 1914 – Paysandu Sport Club founded.
- 1915 – Bolonha Mansion completed by Francisco Bolonha.
- 1918 – Estádio da Curuzú (stadium) opens.
- 1920 – Population: 236,402.
- 1946 – O Liberal newspaper begins publication.
- 1957 – Federal University of Pará established.
- 1960 – Population: 402,170.
- 1970 – Population: 642,514.
- 1976 – TV Liberal Belém begins broadcasting.
- 1978 – Mangueirão (stadium) opens.
- 1980 – Population: 949,545.
- 1982 – Diário do Pará newspaper begins publication.
- 1991 – Population: 1,244,688.
- 1994 – Belém do Pará Convention (official name: Inter-American Convention on the Prevention, Punishment and Eradication of Violence Against Women), the first legally binding international treaty that criminalises all forms of violence against women, especially sexual violence.
- 1994 – Campeonato Internacional de Tênis do Estado do Pará (tennis tournament) begins.
- 1996 – Belém municipal election, 1996 held.
- 1999 – City joins the União das Cidades Capitais Luso-Afro-Américo-Asiáticas (city association).

== 21st century ==
- 2002 – August: Part of 2002 South American Games held in city.
- 2010 – Village Moon and Village Sun skyscrapers built.
- 2013 – Zenaldo Coutinho becomes mayor.
- 2016
  - BRT Belém (bus) begins operating.
  - October: Belém municipal election, 2016 held.
  - Population: 1,446,042.

== See also ==
- Belém history
- History of Belém
- List of mayors of Belém
- Pará history and History of Pará (region)

== Bibliography ==
in English

- Jussara da Silveira Derenji; Jorge Derenji (2009), Churches, palaces and mansions of Belém (PDF), Roteiros do patrimônio (in English and Portuguese), Brasília: Instituto do Patrimônio Histórico e Artístico Nacional, ISBN 9788573341201

in Portuguese

- Album de Belem (in Portuguese). Fidanza. 1902.
- O Municipio de Belém (in Portuguese). Belém do Pará: Archivo da Intendencia Municipal. 1908.
- R. M. Araujo (1998). As cidades da Amazónia no século XVIII: Belém, Macapá e Mazagão (in Portuguese) (2nd ed.). Porto. ISBN 9729483345.
- Antonio Maurício Dias da Costa (2010). "Instrucção e Civilisação nos Clubes e Associações Esportivas em Belém entre 1890 e 1920". Educativa: Revista de Educação (in Portuguese). Pontifícia Universidade Católica de Goiás. doi:10.18224/educ.v13i1.1245 (inactive 12 July 2025). ISSN 1983-7771.
- Phillippe Sendas de Paula Fernandes; Netília Silva dos Anjos Seixas (2010), Imprensa e Política na Belém do início do século XIX (1820-1830) (PDF) (in Portuguese), Sociedade Brasileira de Estudos Interdisciplinares da Comunicação
- A. Meira Filho (2015). Evolução histórica de Belém do Grão-Pará : fundação e história, 1616-1823 (in Portuguese) (2nd ed.). Belém. ISBN 9788556680006.
- Leila Mourão (2017), Memória da indústria paraense (PDF) (in Portuguese), Associação Brasileira de Pesquisadores em História Econômica
