= Mother of God Church (Vigia) =

Church in Vigia, Pará, Brazil

- Igreja da Madre de Deus
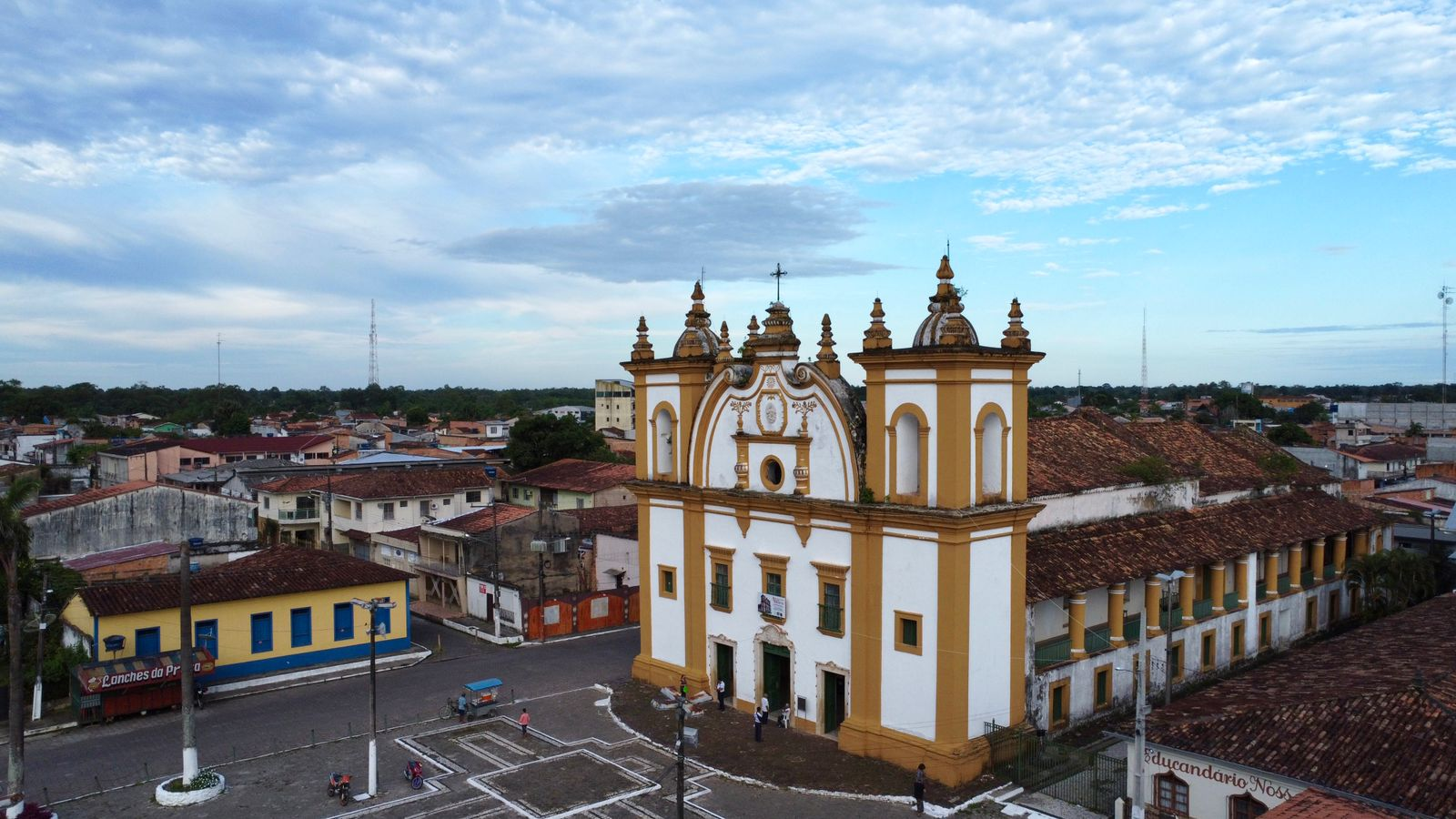
- Mother of God Church in Vigia, Pará.

- Location of the Mother of God Church in Vigia, Pará, Brazil

Religion
- Affiliation: Catholic
- Rite: Roman

Location
- Municipality: Vigia
- State: Pará
- Country: Brazil
- Coordinates: 0.855620°S 48.145489°W

Architecture
- Completed: 1733

Mother of God Church is a Catholic Church founded in 1733, located in the city of Vigia, in the interior of the state of Pará, in Brazil.

== History ==
The Church of the Mother of God is the second major building built by the Jesuit missionaries in the Amazon region. Located in the town of Vigia, in the interior of Pará, its initial construction dates back to 1732, when the company was authorized by the Brazilian Empire to establish a college on the site.

After a year of operation and construction, the place was converted into a religious temple. The church has a single nave, with a bell and paintings depicting the life of Jesus. The sacristy still has paintings and furniture from the 18th century.

== Listing process ==
The church was listed, under process number 434-T-1950, as a historical landmark by the National Historical and Artistic Heritage Service (SPHAN), now the National Institute of Historic and Artistic Heritage (IPHAN), in 1954. The application number of the church in the Livro do Tombo is 424, registered on December 14, 1954.

== Present days ==
After an IPHAN inspection carried out in 2021, it was found that the building was at risk due to patches made to the electrics, as well as the need for structural repairs in the roof, ceiling, and foundations of the building. A fundraising campaign was launched by bishop Carlos Verzeletti, with the support of the Vigia town hall and the municipality's Department of Culture, with the aim of repairing the historic property.

In July 2022, the church was closed to initiate the restoration work, funded by the Government of the state of Pará, under the administration of Helder Barbalho, at a cost of R$4 million. The deadline for the work is eighteen months, with the church undergoing renovation and restoration work. On December 12, 2014, the restoration work was completed for R$5.2 million and the church was reopened. Among the highlights of the restoration were the installation of ramps and adapted toilets to promote accessibility.

== See also ==
- Church of Saint Anne (Belém)
- Our Lady of Grace Cathedral, Belém
