= Convent of the Mercedarians =

Historic building in the Brazilian city of Belém

Coordinates: 1°27′1″S 48°30′2″W

- Convento dos Mercedários
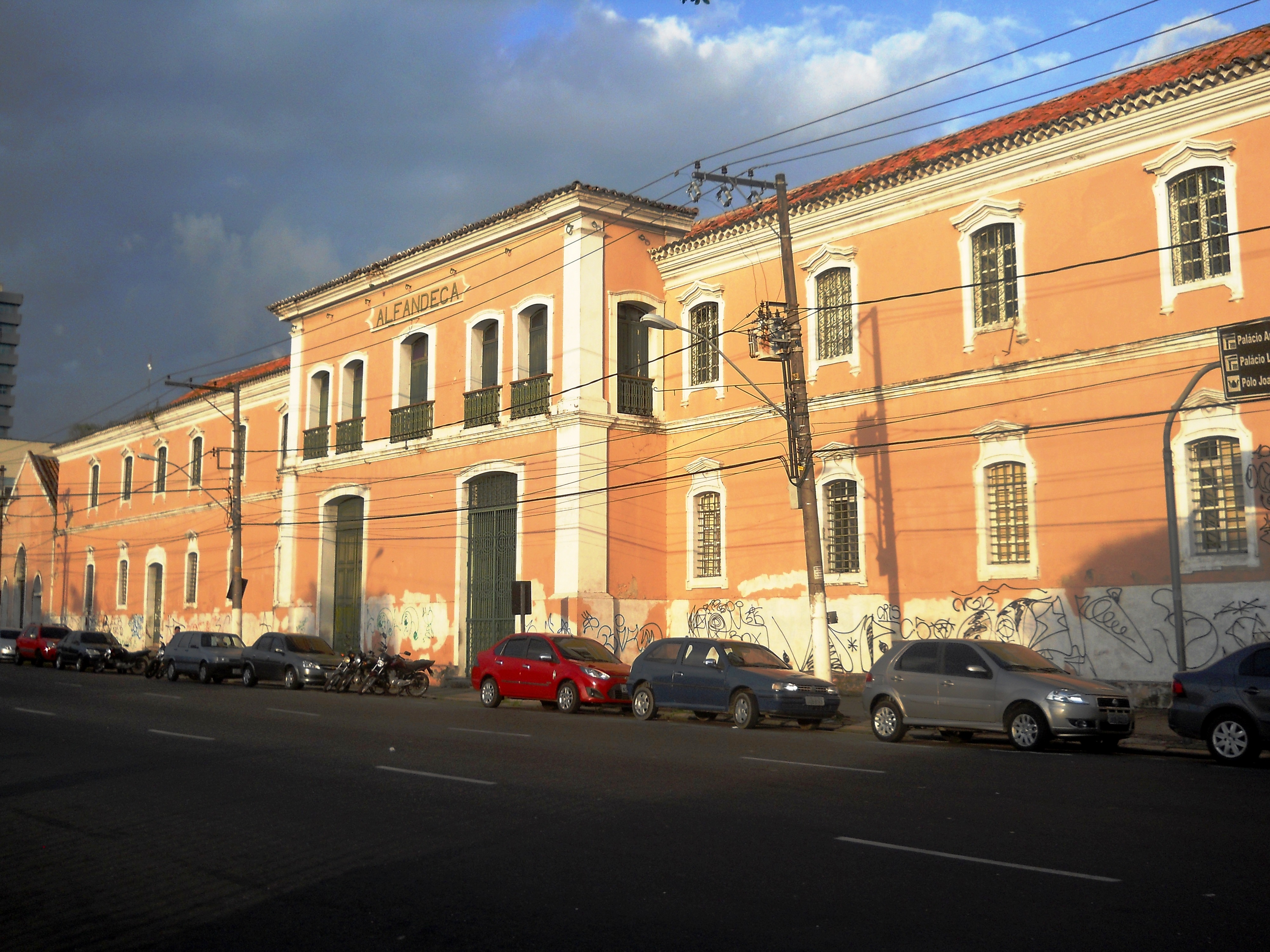
- View of the façade of the Convent of the Mercedarians
- Interactive map of the Convent of the Mercedarians area
- Alternative names: Belem Customs House; War Train; Correios

General information
- Location: Belém, Pará, Brazil
- Inaugurated: 1640

Design and construction
- Designations

National Historic Heritage of Brazil
- Designated: 1941
- Reference no.: 388

The Convent of the Mercedarians is a historic building located in the Brazilian city of Belém, Pará. It is part of the architectural complex that includes the Mercedarian Convent and the Church of Our Lady Mercy. The convent was constructed in 1640 to accommodate friars Pedro de La Rua and João das Mercês, who arrived from the city of Quito with Pedro Teixeira in 1639. In 1941, the building was designated as a historic site by the National Institute of Historic and Artistic Heritage.

== History ==
The convent was the site of several significant events in the history of old Belém. After the departure of the religious order, it was used by various public institutions that played important roles in the city's history, including serving as a stage for the Cabanagem revolt, the headquarters of Belém Customs, the War Train, and Correios.

The convent building experienced a major fire on October 19, 1978, which severely damaged its thick stone walls, though the annexed Church of Our Lady of Mercy was largely unaffected. The fire was intensified by winds from Guajará Bay, which contributed to the rapid spread of the flames. Witnesses reported that the fire began after three explosions in a document depository belonging to Belém City Hall. The convent was renovated and reopened in 1987. It now houses the Superintendence of Patrimony of the Union, Belém Customs, and the regional headquarters of the Ministry of Finance's School of Treasury Administration.

In 2018, the federal government authorized the Federal University of Pará (UFPA) to occupy the space.

== See also ==
- Order of the Blessed Virgin Mary of Mercy
- Church of Saint John the Baptist (Belém)
- Church of Our Lady of Mount Carmel (Belém)
- Church of Saint Anne (Belém)
- Palace of the Eleven Windows
