= Theatro da Paz =

Theater in Belém, Brazil

Coordinates: 01°27′10″S 48°29′37″W

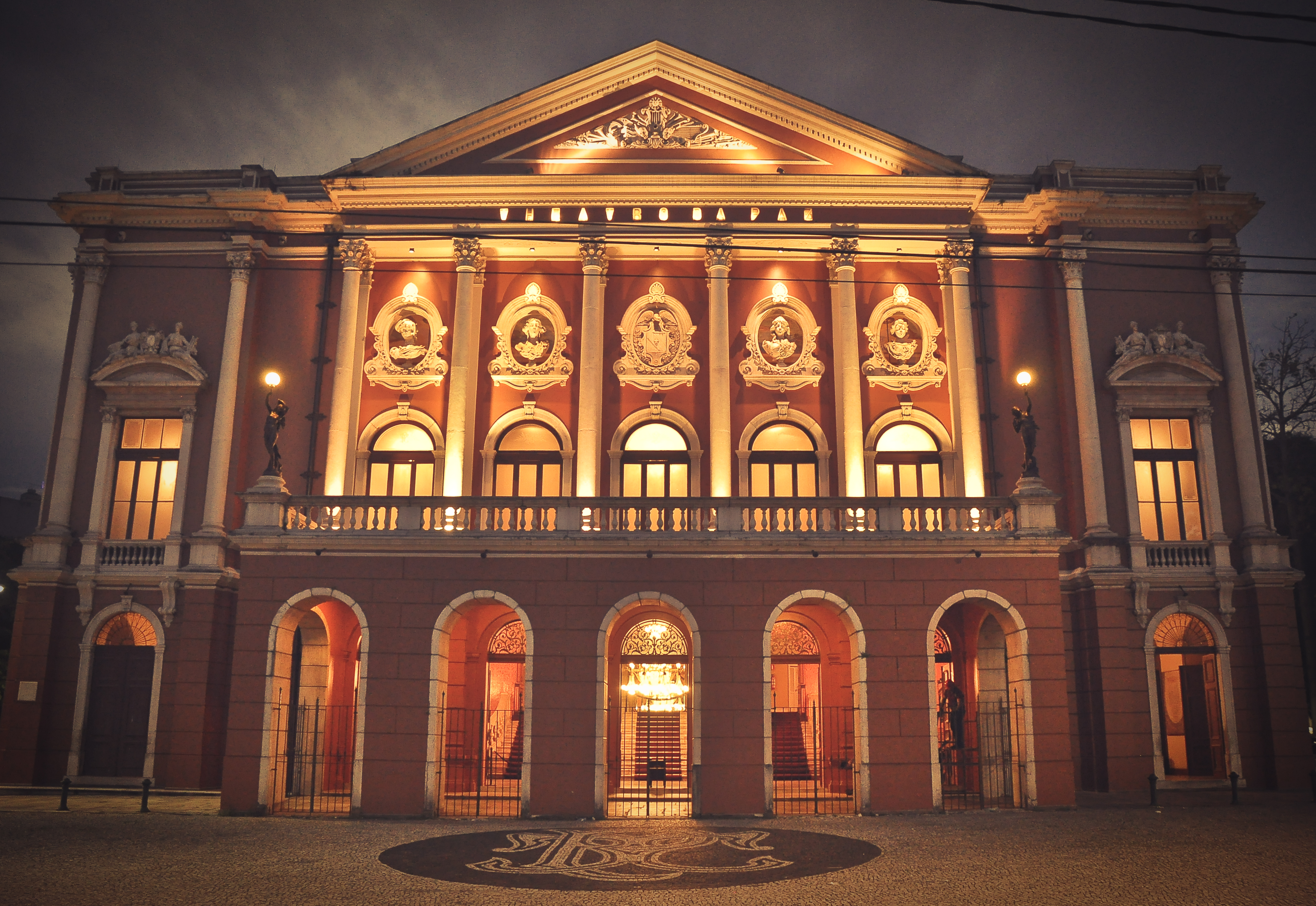
- The front façade
- Interactive map of Theatro da Paz
- Address: Rua da Paz; Belém, Pará; Brazil
- Capacity: 787
- Designation: Instituto do Patrimônio Histórico e Artístico Nacional (IPHAN)

Construction
- Opened: 15 February 1878
- Architect: José Tibúrcio Pereira Magalhães

Website
- www.theatrodapaz.com.br

UNESCO World Heritage Site
- Official name: Teatro da Paz
- Part of: Amazonia Theaters
- Criteria: Cultural: ii, iv
- Reference: 1774
- Inscription: 2026 (48th Session)

National Historic Heritage of Brazil
- Designated: 1963
- Reference no.: 671

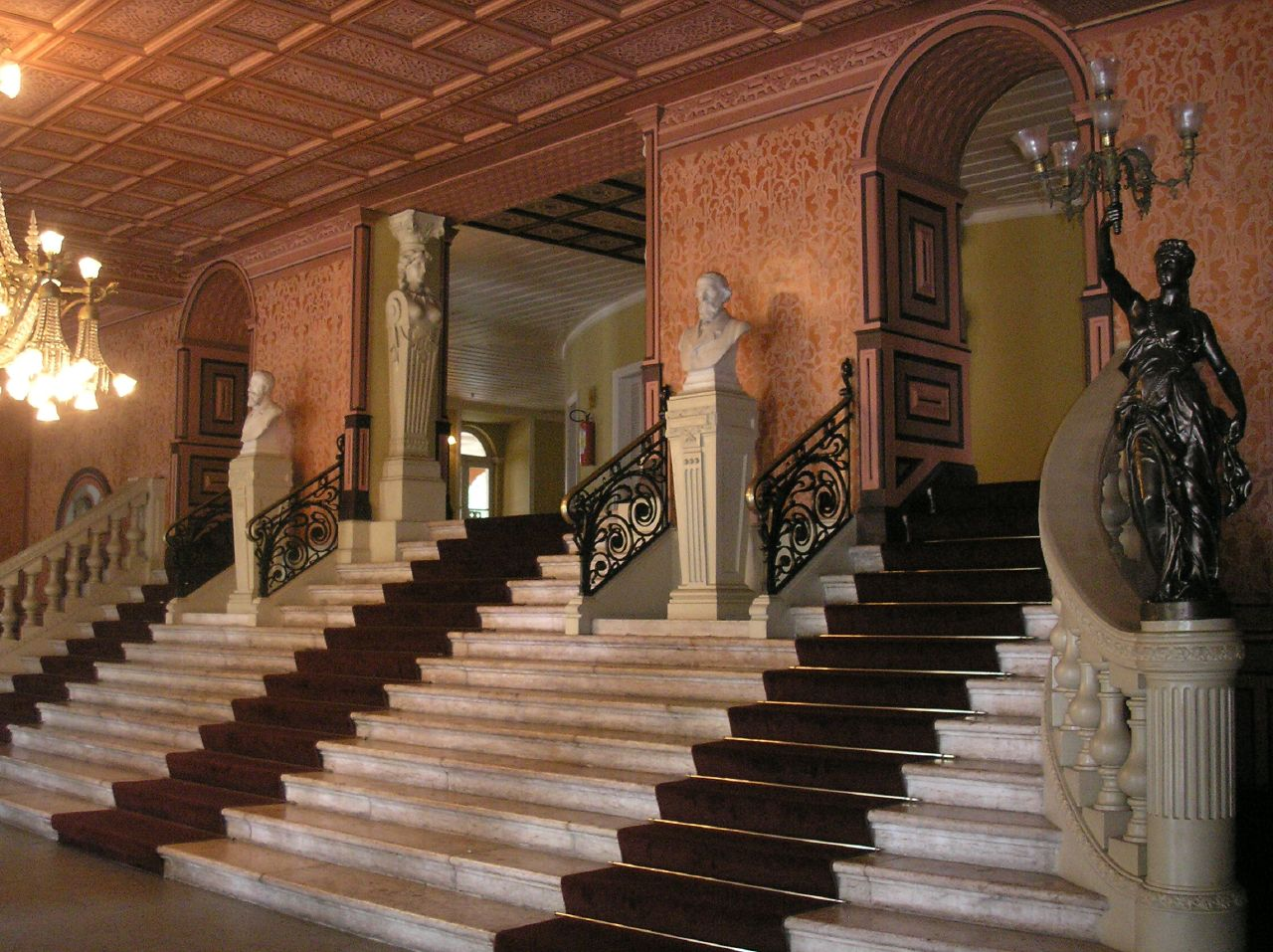
The entrance hall

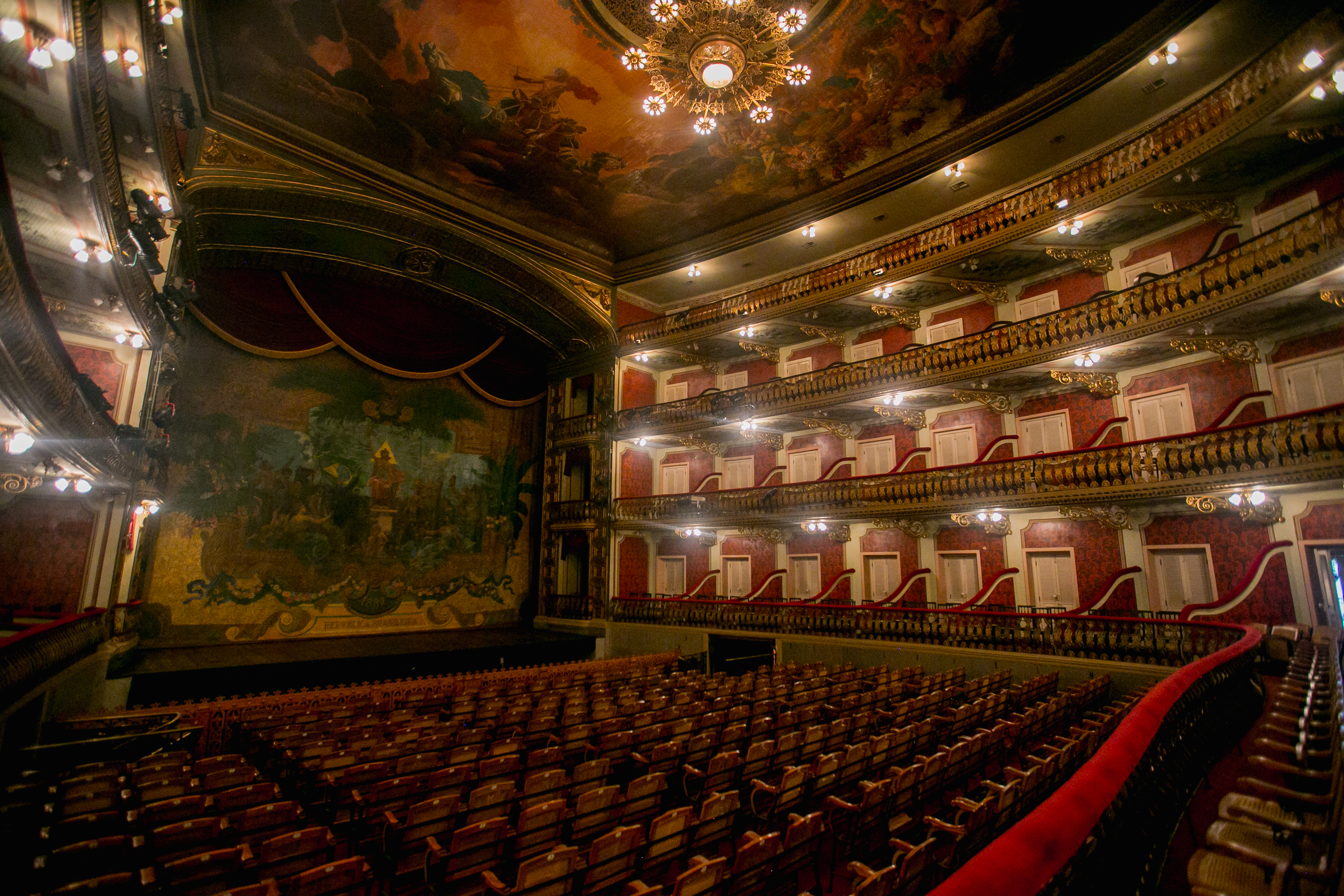
The stage

Theatro da Paz (Theater of Peace) is a theater located in the Praça da República (Republic Square) on the city of Belém, capital of the state of Pará, in Brazil. It was built following neoclassical architectural lines during the golden age of rubber in Amazon Basin. It is considered the most important culture house in northern Brazil. Its name was suggested by bishop Dom Macedo Costa, who also laid the foundation stone of the theater on 3 March 1869.

Theatro da Paz has suffered minor alterations along the years to its façade, namely the reduction of the number of columns over the main entrance. Its architectural lines, however, remain unaltered. It was listed as a historic structure by National Institute of Historic and Artistic Heritage (IPHAN) in 1963, and as a World Heritage Site by UNESCO in 2026.

== History ==
Theatro da Paz was planned by engineer José Tibúrcio Pereira Magalhães, with some alterations added by the Public Constructions office. Construction began in 1869 and ended in 1874, but the theater was only opened to the public after an administrative investigation against its builders.

The premiere feature was Adolphe d'Ennery's drama called The Two Orphans, having taken place on February 16, 1878, and organized by Vicent Pontes de Oliveira theater company, which deal with Theatro da Paz lasted for five years and made him responsible also for the stage lights, decoration, choreography and props, as well as for the organisation within this period.

Theatro da Paz, as in Leandro Tocantins, "is the definitely neoclassical". On each side, there are patios surrounded by columns and staircases giving access to Praça da República (Republic Square). Straw seats in the shape of a horseshoe. In the lobby, there are two carrara-marmor busts: José de Alencar and Gonçalves Dias, who introduced the indianismo in Brazil. In the noble hall, next to a giant-sized crystal mirror, remain the busts of maestros Carlos Gomes and Henrique Gurjão.

In Theatro da Paz, Carlos Gomes ran his most famous opera, O Guarani, and Russian ballerina Anna Pavlova also touched its stage with her ballet shoes. Decoration was planned by Italian Domenico de Angelis who also decorated Teatro Amazonas in Manaus. He also painted the theater's panel in its spectacle room's roof, which depicted Greek gods, as well as the Jover roof, which was lost due to an infiltration and later restored in 1960 by another Italian artist, Armando Baloni.

In 1904, during Augusto Montenegro's government, four busts representing music, poetry, comedy and tragedy were included in Theatro da Paz decoration. During the golden age of rubber, world's most famous lyrical companies featured their presentations in the theater, but after the rubber era, it has been neglected and suffered from bad maintenance.

After Armando Baloni's painting, in 1960, Pará state governor then, Aurélio do Carmo, kept the restoration until 1965, under Jarbas Passarinho's administration, Theatro da Paz was finally fully recovered and reopened to the public. The writing "Theatro", in archaic Portuguese, has been kept. Theatro da Paz underwent another major reformation in the 90s, under governor Almir Gabriel, when its original colors were restored. It was also during his administration that modern Opera Festivals begun to take place, with free or low-cost renditions of operas like Il Barbiere di Seviglia or O Guarani.

When declared by Brazil's Institute for Protection of Historical and Architectural Patrimony, its president chose Theatro da Paz as one of the "14 most beautiful jewels of Brazilian patrimony".

The Theater has an exchange partnership with the University of Missouri School of Music in Columbia, Missouri, United States.

== Protected status ==
The National Institute of Historic and Artistic Heritage listed the Theatro da Paz a protected historic structure by in 1963. It was included in the Book of Historical Works as Inscription no. 671. In July 2026, it was designated by UNESCO as a World Heritage Site along with Teatro Amazonas.
