= Reservoir of Mocó =

Moco's Water Reservoir
- Reservatório do Mocó
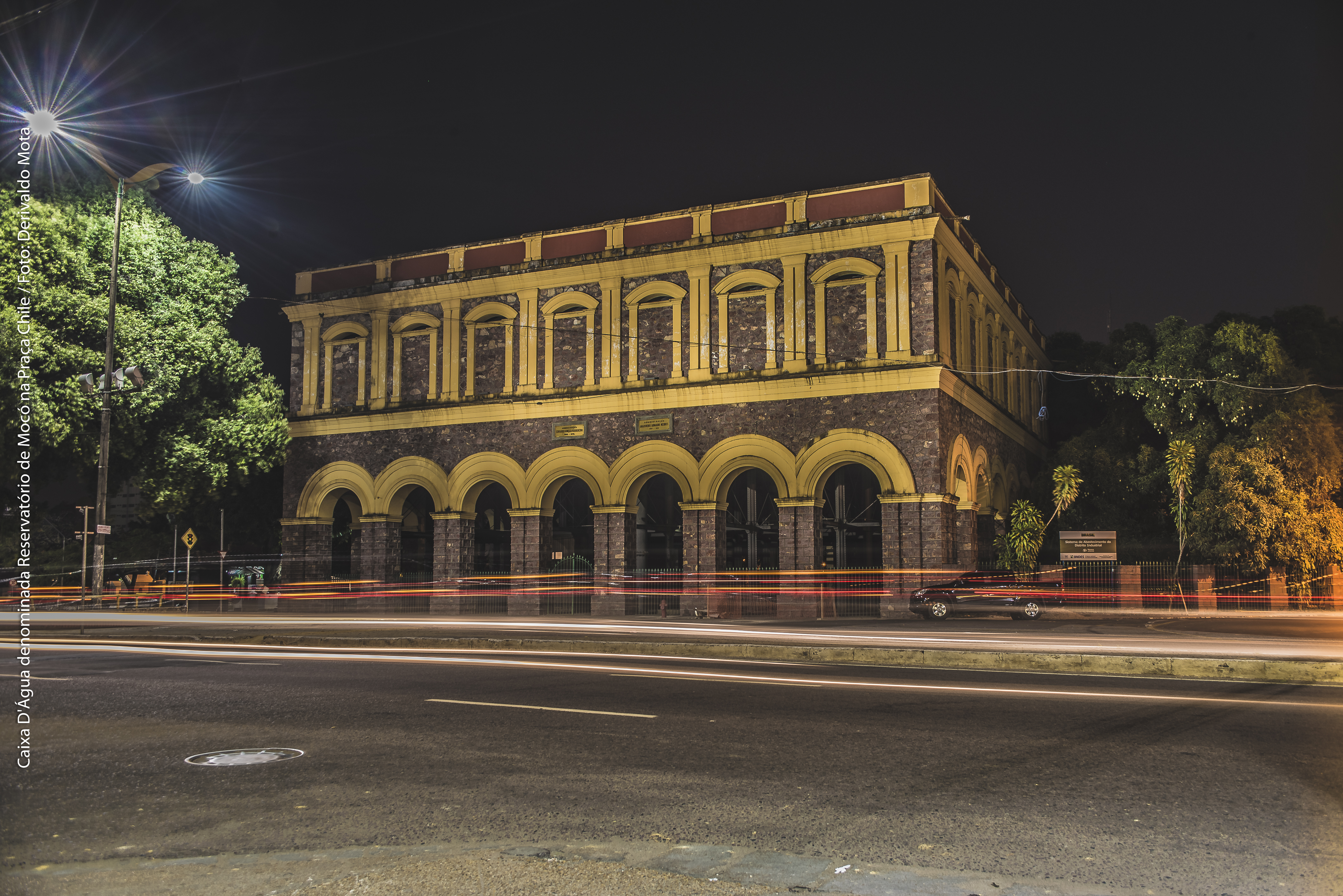
- Moco reservoir, in Manaus, northern Brazil.
- Interactive map of the Moco's Water Reservoir area
- Alternative names: Water Box of Manaus

General information
- Type: Reservoir
- Architectural style: Renaissance style
- Location: Amazonas, Adrianopolis neighbourhood, Manaus, Brazil
- Coordinates: 3°6′48.1″S 60°1′0″W
- Construction started: 1896; 130 years ago
- Completed: 1899
- Inaugurated: 23 September 1899; 126 years ago
- Owner: Water supply company of Manaus.

Renovating team
- Architect: Frank Hirst Hebblethwaite
- Structural engineer: Henrique Eduardo Weaver

National Historic Heritage of Brazil

Reservatório do Mocó (English: Reservoir of Mocó or water box of Moco) is a water reservoir located in Manaus, northern Brazil in the street Belém, built in the 19th century, to the regular supply of water for the whole Manaus city at that time, remains in operation until the present day fuelling some neighbourhoods of the city, the monument belongs to water supply company, he was opened in 1899, the reservoir is a monument of renaissance style tumbled by IPHAN (National Institute of Historic and Artistic Heritage) as national historic heritage, composed of cast iron and ornate interior, covered by an external structure of masonry containing seven aedicules and seven arches with similar formats the windows and doors in the all pavilions, both in all their faces.

== See also ==
- Amazon Theatre
- Mercado Adolpho Lisboa
- Amazon River
