= Natividade, Tocantins =

Municipality in Tocantins, Brazil

Natividade
- Municipality
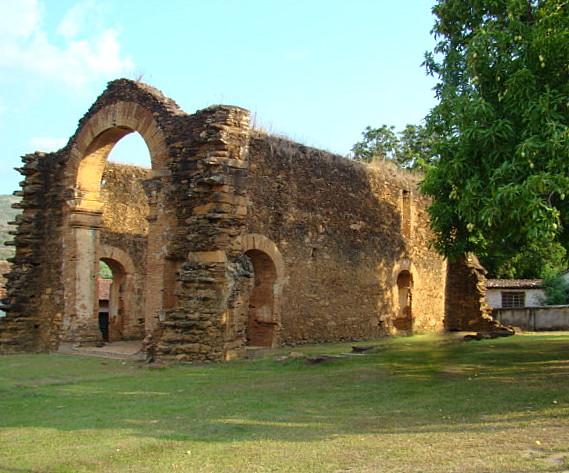

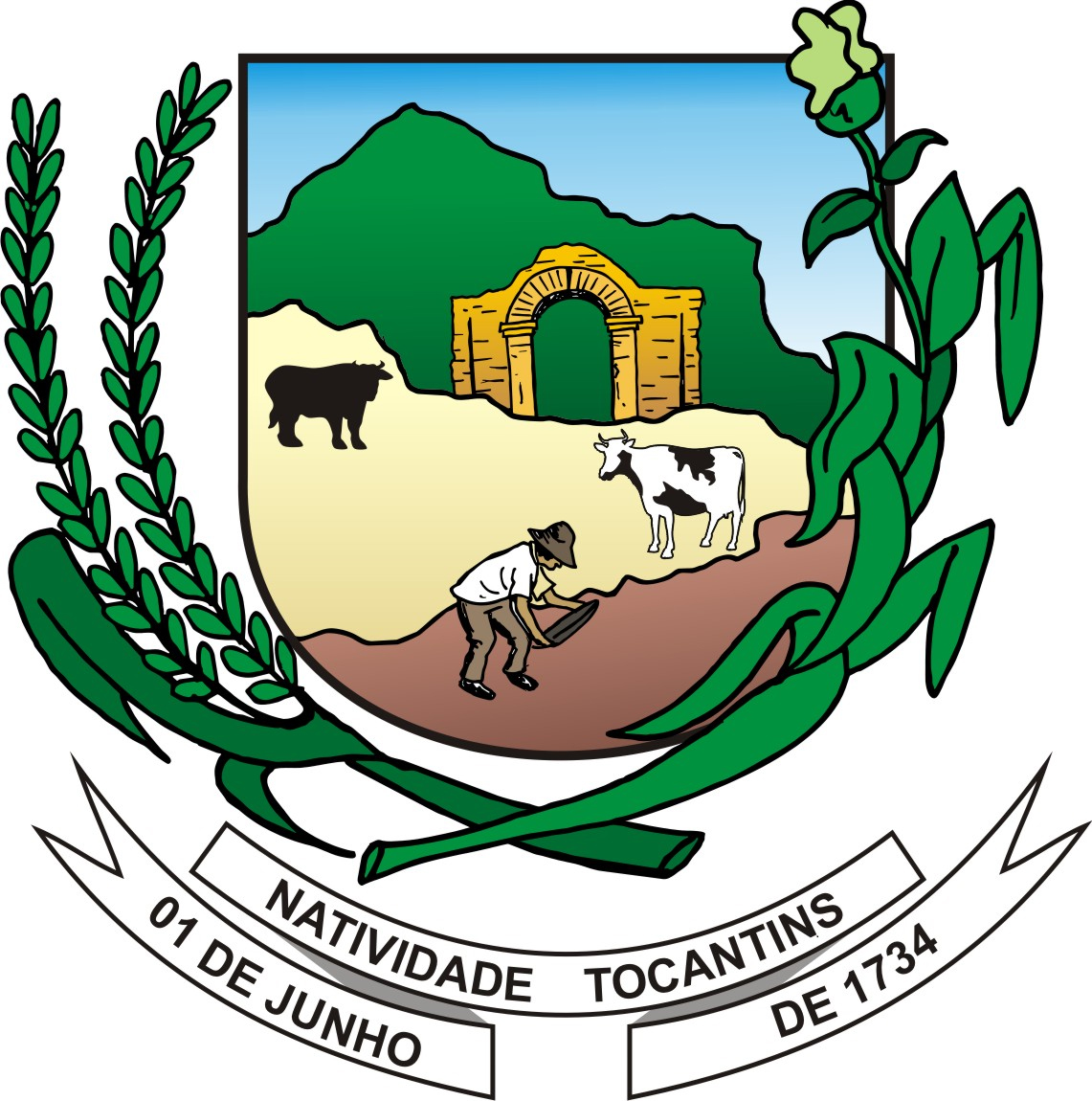
- Flag Coat of arms

- Location in Brazil
- Coordinates: 11°42′35″S 47°43′24″W
- Country: Brazil
- Region: North
- State: Tocantins

Area
  - Total: 3,240 km^{2} (1,250 sq mi)
- Elevation: 323 m (1,060 ft)

Population (2020)
  - Total: 9,250
  - Density: 2.85/km^{2} (7.39/sq mi)
- Time zone: UTC−3 (BRT)

Natividade (meaning the nativity) is a municipality (município) in the state of Tocantins in Brazil.

== Geography ==
The estimated population in 2020 was 9,250, the area is 3,240 km^{2}. The elevation is 323 m.

== Commemoration ==
The Roman Catholic commemoration of Senhor do Bonfim is the most traditional in the state of Tocantins.

== See also ==
- List of municipalities in Tocantins
