= Dom Frei Caetano Brandão Square =

Square in Brazil

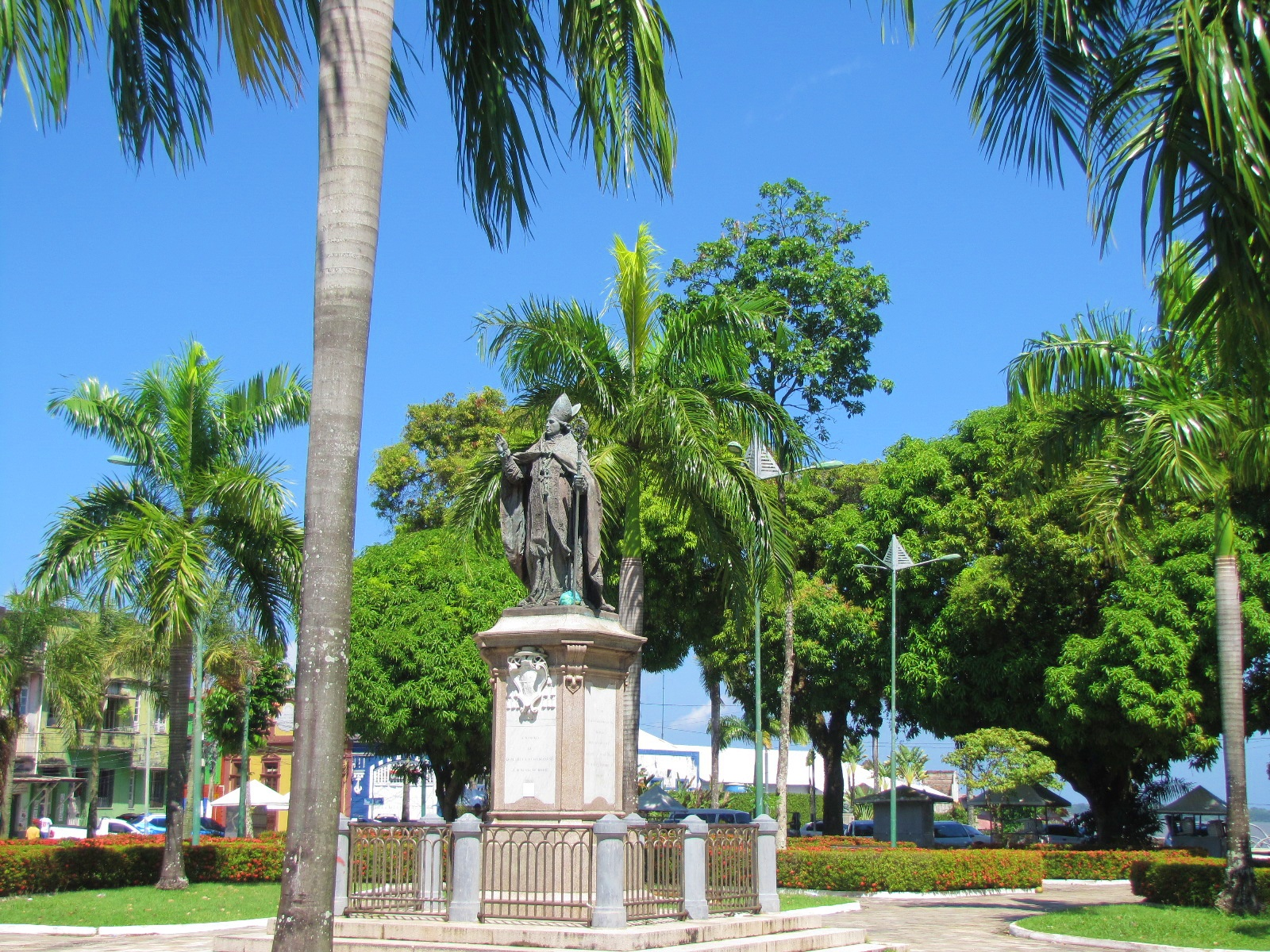
- Interactive map of Dom Frei Caetano Brandão Square
- Type: Public square, historical heritage
- Location: Belém, Pará; Brazil
- Coordinates: 1°27′18.76″S 48°30′19.497″W

The Dom Frei Caetano Brandão Square (Portuguese: Praça Dom Frei Caetano Brandão), originally called Largo da Sé, is located in the Cidade Velha neighborhood in the Brazilian city of Belém, capital of the state of Pará.

The square was the meeting point between colonists and indigenous people, as well as the initial mark of the colonization of Belém and the region. It had its peak during the rubber cycle, which enriched and modernized Belém's society. It still preserves historical and cultural traces from the Portuguese colonizers in its composition.

The structure is part of the architectural, landscape, and religious complex known as Feliz Lusitânia, the initial nucleus of the city of Belém.

== History ==
=== City ===
The city of Belém was founded in 1616, having the Largo da Matriz, currently Dom Frei Caetano Brandão Square, as its starting point. Its first construction was the Forte do Presépio, now Forte do Castelo. Before the Rubber Cycle, the city was hardly urbanized or landscaped.

In 1910, the rubber trade represented 40% of Brazil's total exports, making Belém a prosperous and booming city. The intendant Antônio Lemos was responsible for expanding the city, widening avenues and draining swamps, as well as building iron monuments at the Ver-o-Peso Market and towards the Largo da Pólvora, today's Republic Square. He also carried out treatment of parks, squares and gardens through hygienist policies in Belém.

Today, the Dom Frei Caetano Brandão Square stands as a symbol of the prosperity of an era.

=== Construction of the square ===
The Largo da Matriz defined the urban layout of Belém, starting with the construction of the first streets and houses of the colony, from where the first roads opened in the forest towards the countryside were born. However, for five years, Belém did not extend beyond the Forte do Presépio and the Largo da Matriz. The first documented street, Rua do Norte, currently Siqueira Mendes Street, was built in 1621.

As the city developed, simple and complex constructions began to share the same space. Among the most significant are the small chapel dedicated to Saint Francis Xavier, and the Saint Alexander Church and College, built in 1653 by the Jesuit Missionary Company, which currently houses the Museum of Sacred Art.

In 1748, the current Sé Cathedral began to be built and the square was renamed Largo da Sé. In 1897, the square was renamed Frei Caetano Brandão Square in honor of the 4th Bishop of Pará, highlighting his important role in the creation of schools and social colleges, in the development of arts and crafts, and in his political participation.

== Landscaping ==
A bronze statue in honor of Dom Friar Caetano Brandão is surrounded by boulevards that are bordered by flower beds, paved with slate stone and composed of palm trees, which replaced the mango trees due to the fact that their canopies made it difficult to see the landscape and the surroundings.

== Feliz Lusitânia Complex ==
With a collection dating from the 17th, 18th, and 19th centuries, the patrimony of the square represents, historically and culturally, the society of Belém, beginning with the relationship between the settlers and the indigenous and black people. Therefore, the Feliz Lusitânia Complex, developed in order to valorize the historic area of Belém, included the square in its project, which resulted in the revitalization and restoration of the region. Such interventions have turned the square into a place of reference to the colonial past.

== Historical Heritage ==
The square was declared a National Heritage Site on July 28, 1964, by the National Institute of Historic and Artistic Heritage. The listed properties in the area are:

- Sé Cathedral, 234-T-40;
- Saint Alexander Church and College, 235-T-40;
- Forte do Castelo, 644-T-61;
- Military Hospital (former Royal Hospital), 707-T-63.

== Cultural Function ==
The Sé Cathedral is the starting point of the Círio de Nazaré procession, one of the largest religious manifestations in the country.

Since 2003, with the lengthening of the boats route that made possible the arrival of the Círio Fluvial to the Feliz Lusitânia Complex, the spaces called Janelas para o Rio (English: Windows to the River) were created. The open waterfront of the Forte do Presépio and Palace of the Eleven Windows opened a new opportunity for visitors to get in touch with local history and participate in cultural events.

== Actualities ==
In the square, you can find traders of coconut water, snacks, and typical foods arranged in standardized stalls and registered with the Municipal Secretariat of Economy.
