= Church of Saint Anne (Belém) =

Catholic church structure in Pará, Brazil

- Igreja de Santana
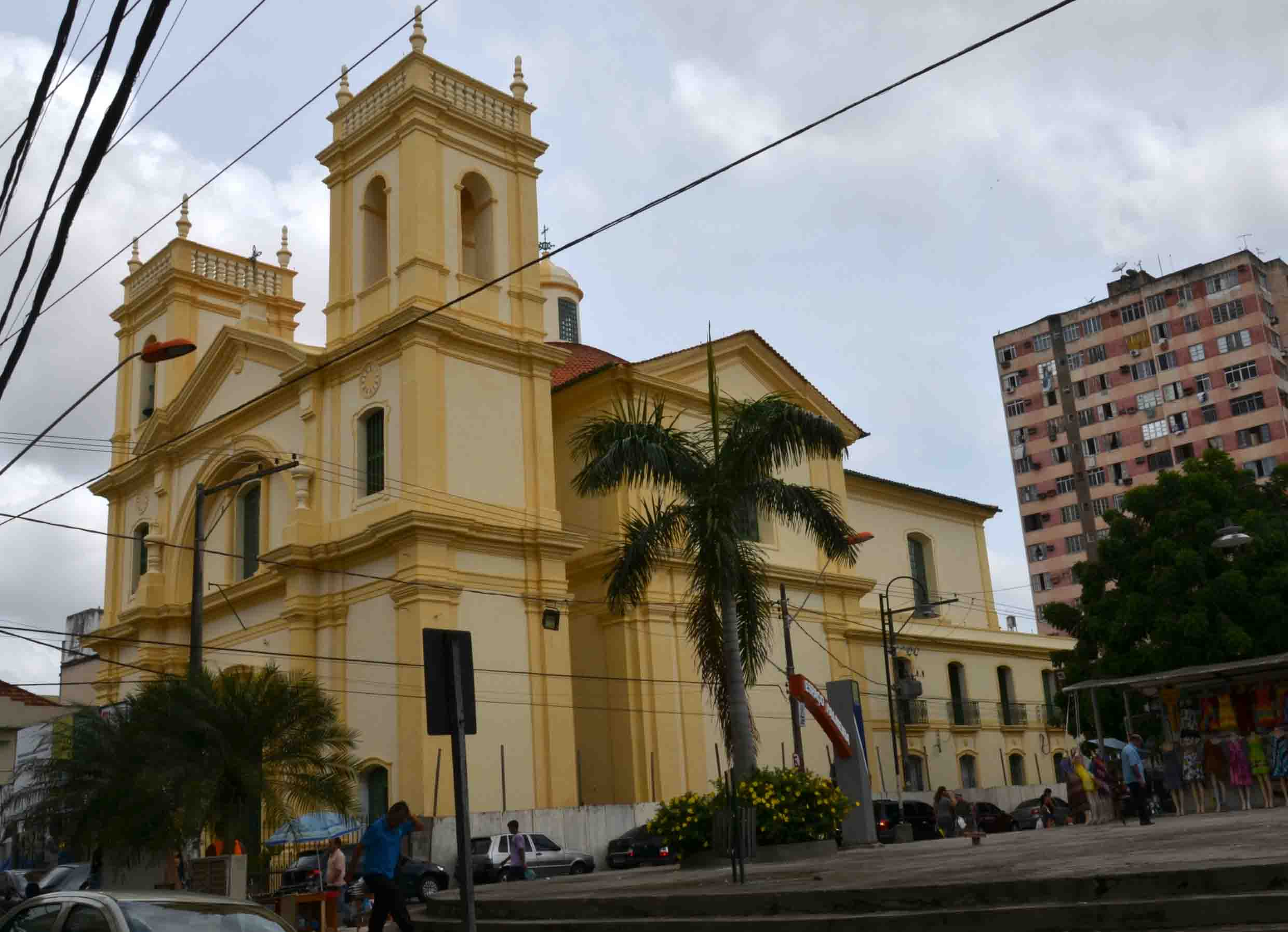

- Location of the Church of Saint Anne in Brazil

Religion
- Affiliation: Catholic
- Rite: Roman Rite
- Ownership: Roman Catholic Archdiocese of Belém do Pará
- Patron: Saint John the Baptist
- Status: Active

Location
- Municipality: Belém
- State: Pará
- Country: Brazil
- Coordinates: 1.451386°S 48.498591°W

Architecture
- Architect: Giuseppe Landi

National Historic Heritage of Brazil
- Designated: 1950
- Reference no.: 434

The Church of Saint Anne (Portuguese: Igreja de Sant'Ana), also known as Church of Our Lady of Saint Anne of Campina (Igreja de Nossa Senhora de Sant'Ana da Campina), is a Catholic church located in the neighborhood of Campina, Belém, in Pará. It was designed and built by the Italian architect Giuseppe Landi, and his first major work of after his arrival in Brazil. Its cornerstone was laid in 1760, but the structure was only completed in 1782. Landi partly funded the construction of the church himself. The Church of Saint Anne became the second parish church established in Belém during the colonial period.

== History ==
The first Church of Saint Anne was built in 1727 as the second parish of colonial Belém in the Campinas neighborhood. It proved to be inadequate, and construction of the Church of Saint Anne began in 1760 to accommodate the parish of the Campina. It was designed by the architect Giuseppe Landi (1713-1791), a devotee of Saint Anne, and used his own resources for the construction. When Landi was appointed judge of the Brotherhood of the Blessed Sacrament, he offered the church a silver reliquary with a bone particle of Saint Anne that had belonged to one of his ancestors, Giacopo Landi. The work was only completed in 1782 due to its complexity and the lack of resources.

=== 2004 restoration ===
In 2004, the National Institute of Historic and Artistic Heritage (Instituto do Patrimônio Histórico e Artístico Nacional - IPHAN) began restoration work on the church. In 2005, the Brazilian Development Bank (Banco Nacional do Desenvolvimento - BNDES) complemented IPHAN's renovation by supporting the execution of architectural services and the artistic restoration of movable and integrated elements. The first phase of the renovation work began with the recovery of the facade cladding and the roof, which was stabilized and received ceiling protection. The chancel, nave, side rooms (chapel of the Blessed Sacrament, sacristy and consistory), baptistery, integrated artistic elements (main altarpiece and transept altarpieces), canvases, folding screen and images sculpted in wood and plaster were renovated.

The restoration work was completed in 2012. The rear of the church structure and left side facades were also restored, with pilasters, architrave and openings rebuilt from the remains found in the walls. The renovation included new plumbing, electrical and lighting installations, including wiring for the security and sound systems and a lightning rod system.

== Architectural features ==
Built in the late Italian Baroque style with neoclassical features, the church structure has a Greek cross floor plan, a rectangular chancel and a central dome. Landi designed the Church of Saint Anne without a bell tower or steeple, similar to the design of his nearby Church of Saint John the Baptist. Portuguese colonial church were built with either one or two lateral bell towers, differing from Landi's plan. Two 39-meter-high towers were added to the structure in 1839, and "have been controversial ever since." The art historian Germain Bazin stated that "the two clumsy belfries completely disfigured Landi's initial idea." The facade is now divided into three sections delimited by columns and pilasters; an entablature separates the two storey levels. A triangular pediment crowns the central portion of the facade. In the 19th century, two towers were added, hiding the columns and suppressing the fins. The urns, which used to be on the side of the pediment, are now on the entablature.

=== Interior ===
Inside, the church structure is 37 meters long and 19.5 meters wide. The side altars are made of marble. The chancel is rectangular. Two annexes, one for the sacristy and the other for the brotherhood room, complete the interior of the church structure. Doric pilasters are placed throughout the nave and columns, also Doric, support the triumphal arch. The walls of the altars and the chancel are covered in marble. An entablature with triglyphs crosses the entire nave. The nave ceiling is in the form of an ogival vault, crowned by a dome with a round lantern; these features are rare in Brazilian church architecture. The nave ceiling has an elaborate floral painting. The church has a precious collection of artwork. They including an image of Saint Peter, a replica of one in Rome. The side chapels have two canvases six meters long and three meters high by the Portuguese artist Pedro Alexandrino (1729–1810), and date to 1778.

== Protected status ==
The Church of Saint Anne was listed as a historic structure by the National Institute of Historic and Artistic Heritage in 1940. It was included in the Book of Historical Works as Inscription no. 460. The directive is dated January 23, 1962.

== Access ==
The church is open to the public and may be visited.

== Gallery ==
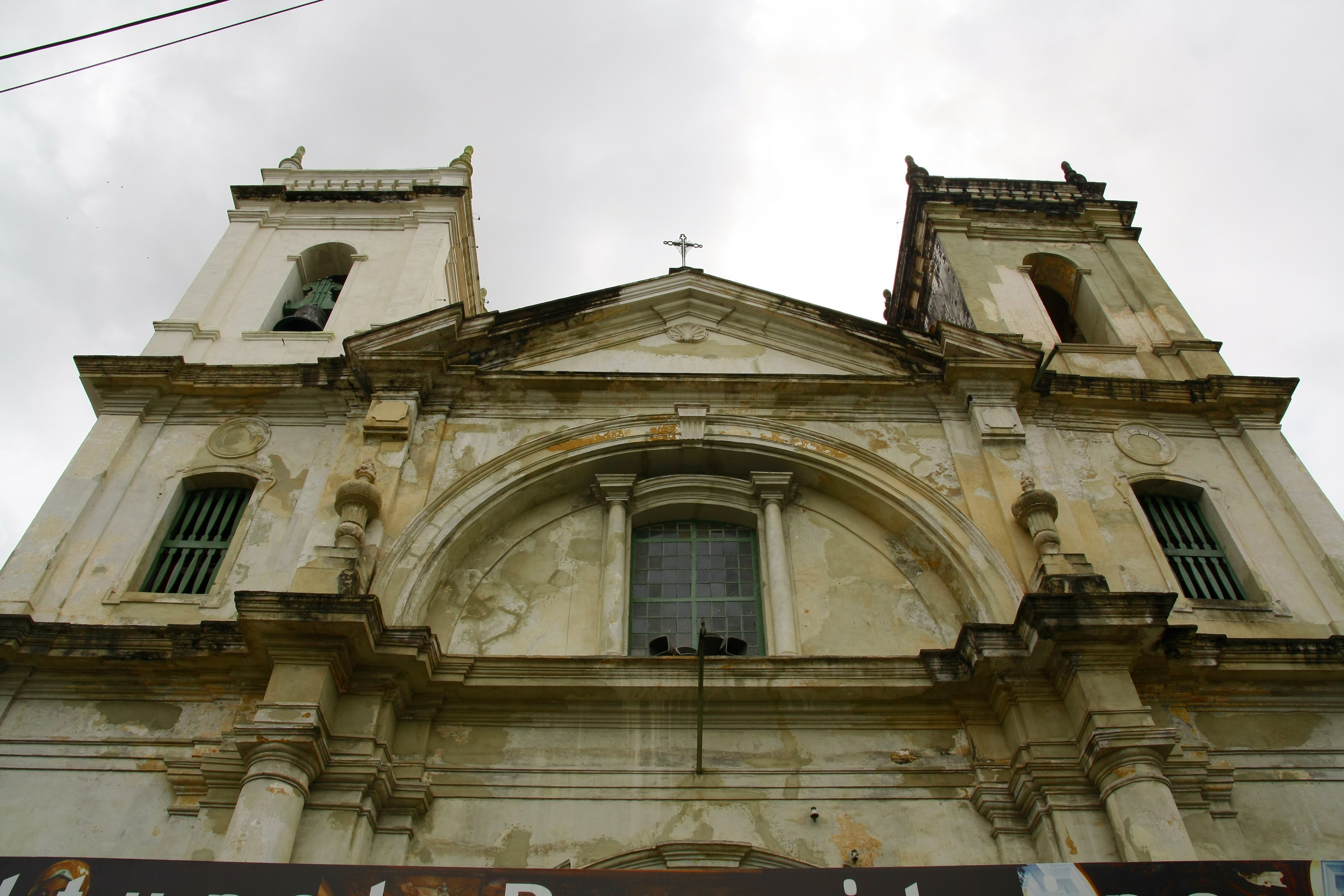
Façade before the 2009 restoration

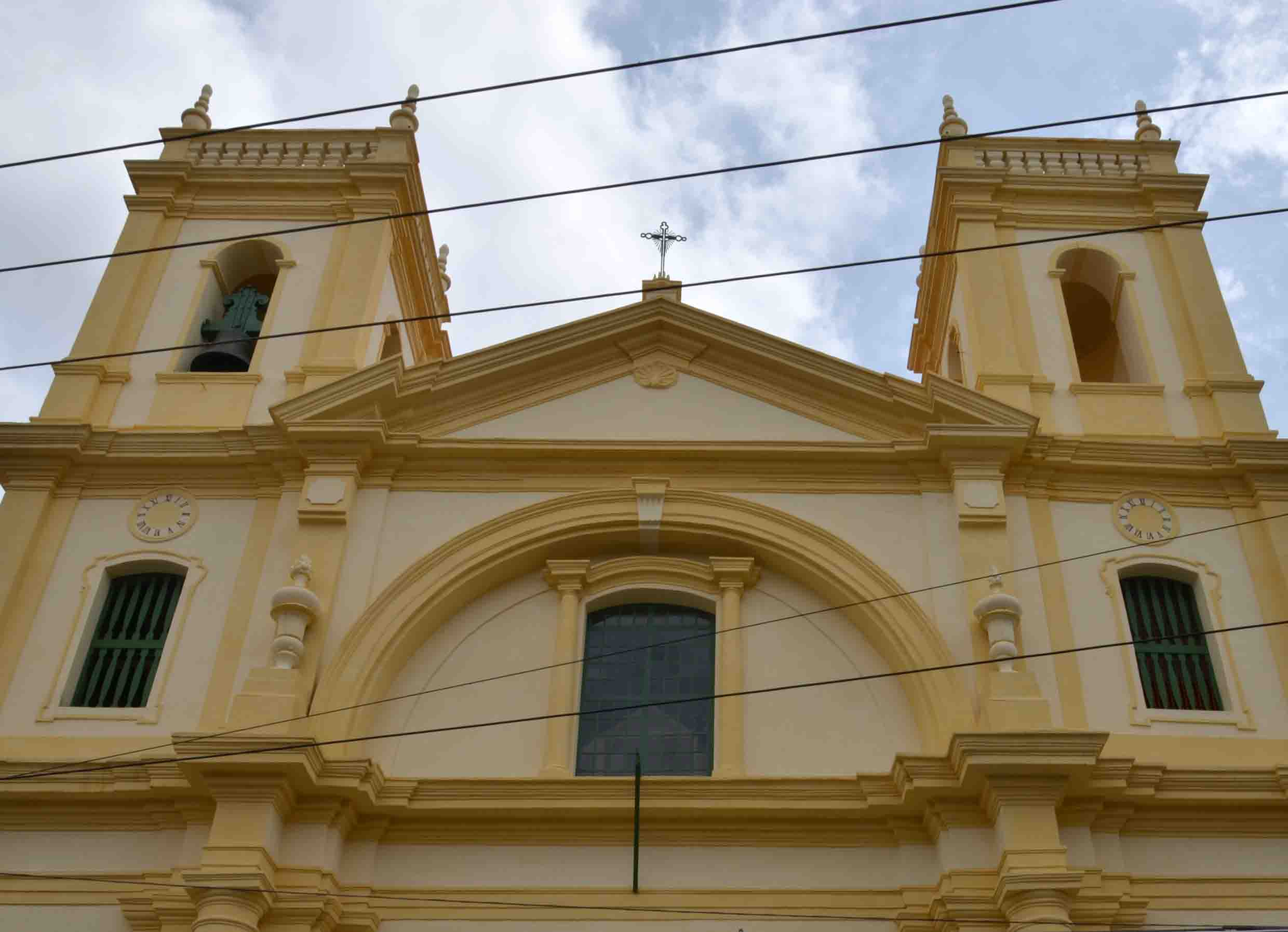
Façade before the 2012 restoration

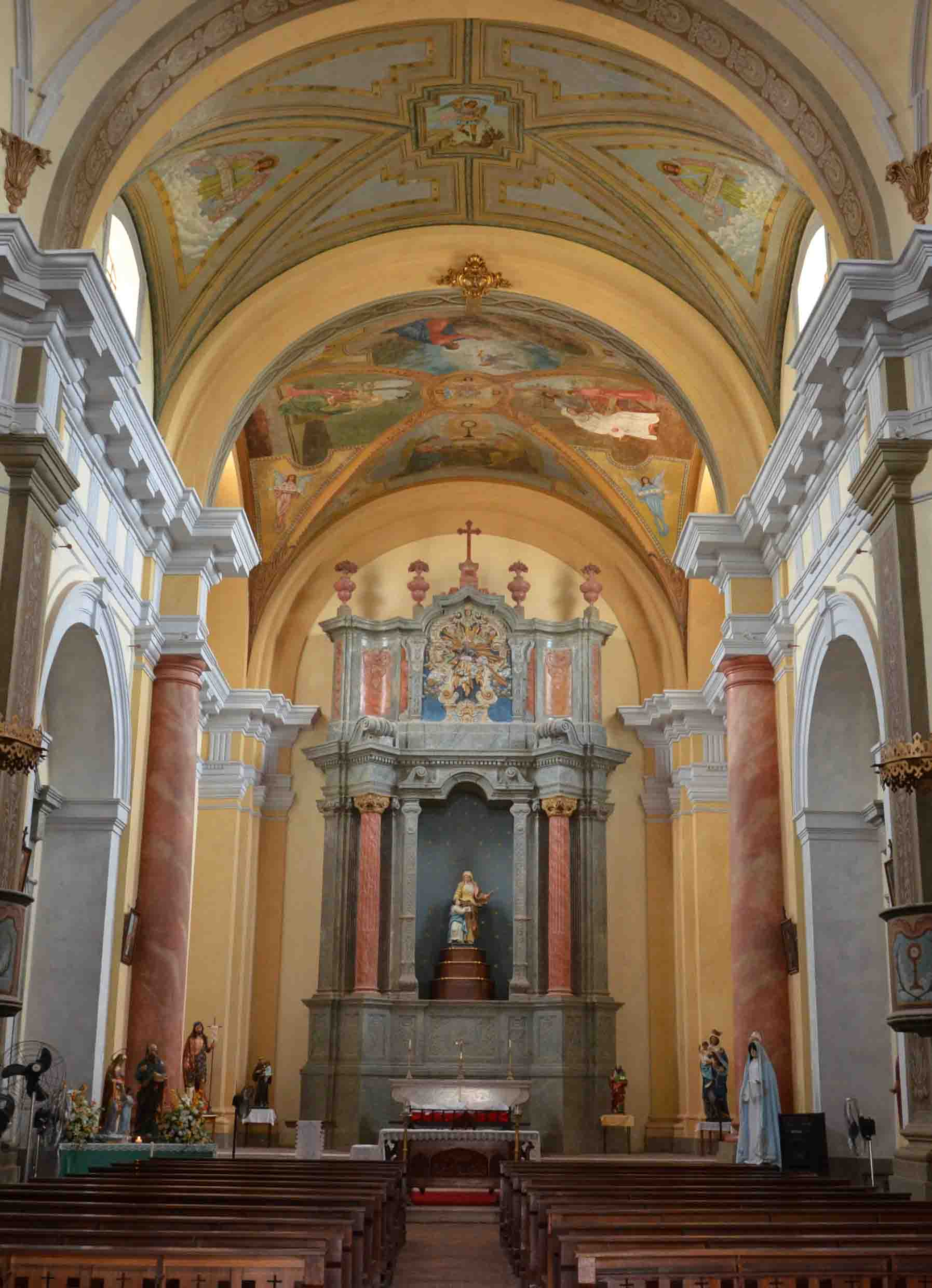
Church interior

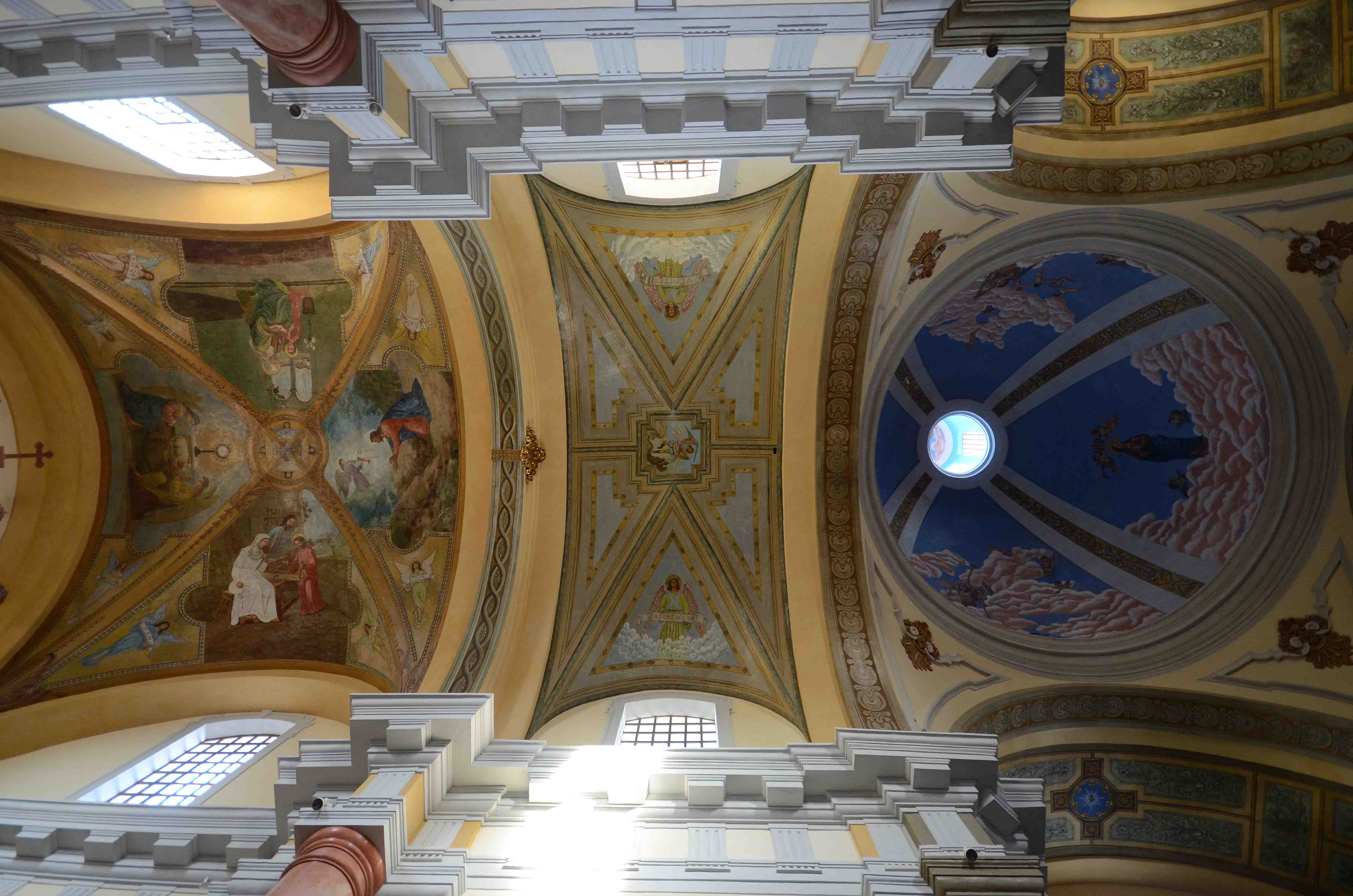
Panels of nave ceiling

== See also ==
- Giuseppe Landi
- Culture and tourism in Belém
- List of IPHAN heritage sites in the North of Brazil
- 18th-century Western domes
