= Vigia, Pará =

Vigia
- Municipality
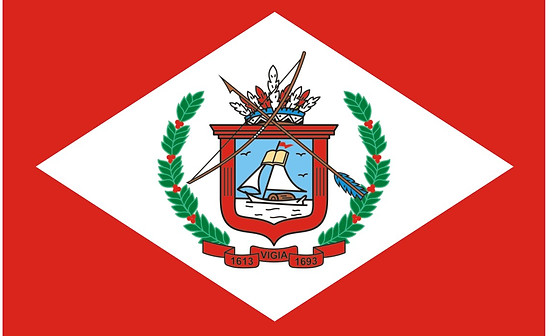
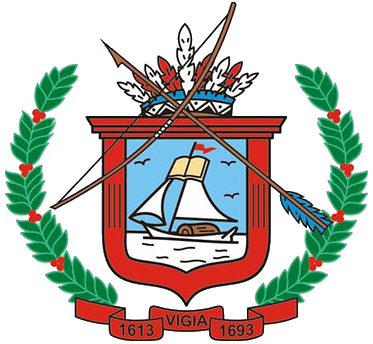
- Flag Coat of arms

- Location in Pará state

- Location in Brazil
- Coordinates: 0°51′30″S 48°8′30″W
- Country: Brazil
- State: Pará

Area
  - Total: 539.08 km^{2} (208.14 sq mi)

Population (2020)
  - Total: 54,172
  - Density: 100.49/km^{2} (260.27/sq mi)
- Time zone: UTC−3 (BRT)

Vigia is a municipality in the northeastern part of the state of Pará, Brazil. The town was founded on 16 January 1616. The population is 54,172 (2020 est.) in an area of 539.08 km^{2}.

== Population history ==
Year	Population
2004	41,637
2006	42,214
2015	51,173
2020	54,172
