= Giuseppe Antonio Landi =

Italian painter (1713–1791)

- Born: 30 October 1713; Bologna, Italy
- Died: 22 June 1791 (aged 77)
- Occupation: Architect
- Buildings: Our Lady of Grace Cathedral; Church of Saint John the Baptist; Church of Our Lady of Mount Carmel; Lauro Sodré Palace
- Known for: Quadratura paintings

Giuseppe Antonio Landi (30 October 1713 – 22 June 1791) was an 18th-century Italian neoclassical architect and painter of quadratura.

== Biography ==
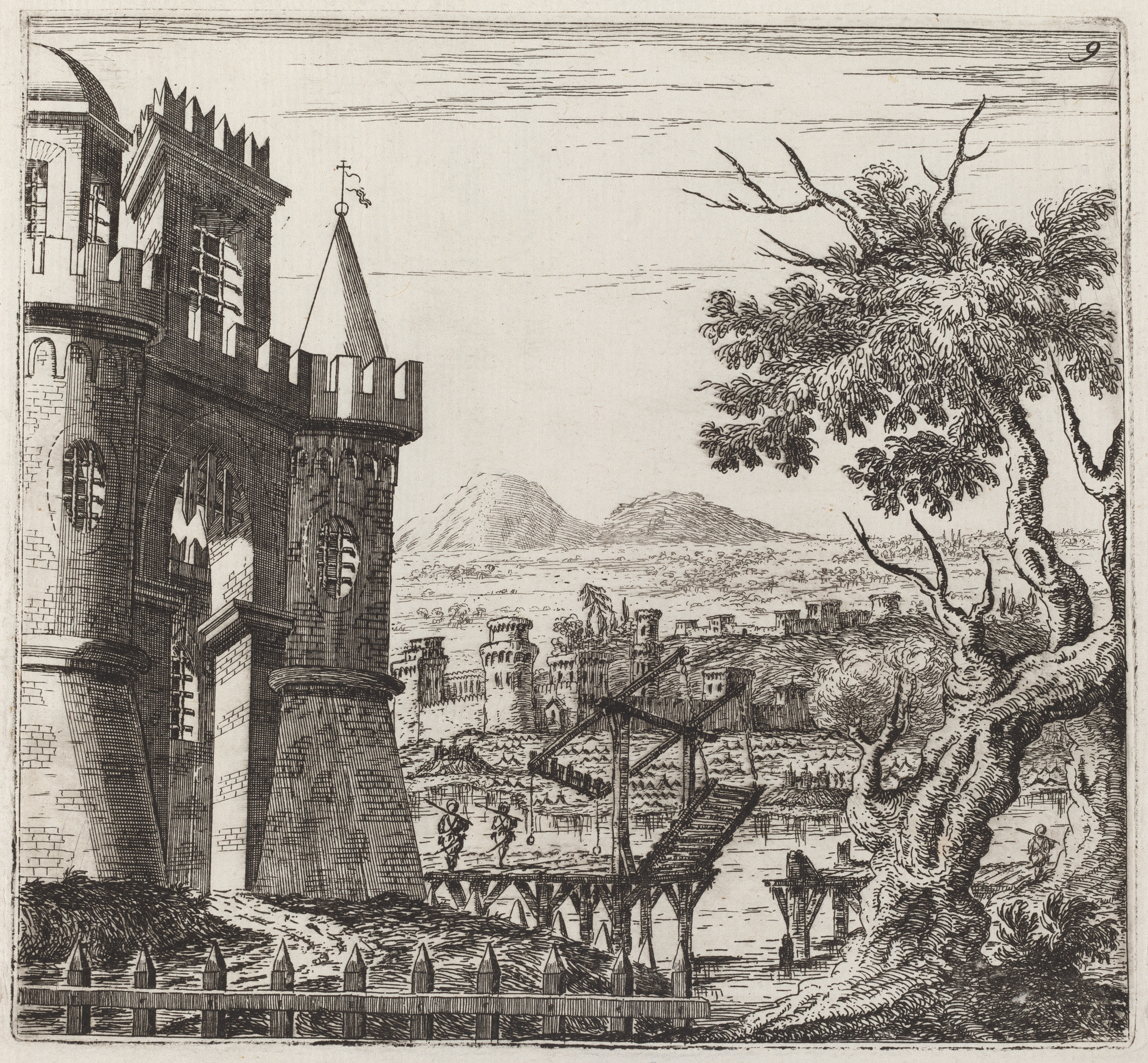
Landscape with a Castle and a Drawbridge by Landi

Landi was born in Bologna. He was a pupil of Ferdinando Galli-Bibiena, and was received as an Academician of Bologna, where he was professor of architecture and perspective. Landi accepted a position as a draftsman for an expedition demarcating Portuguese territories in the North Region of Brazil under Dom João V. He left Bologna at the end of 1750 or beginning of 1751, taking a boat in Genoa bound for Lisbon. Landi stayed in Portugal for two years at the beginning of the reign of Dom José I of Portugal.

Landi left for Pará on 2 June 1753, with other members of the technical commission. The commission stayed in Belém for a year before moving up to the upper Rio Negro, the theater of future operations. At the time of his arrival Francisco Xavier de Mendonça Furtado was governor and captain general of the Captaincy of Grão-Pará; Furtado was also the brother of the Count of Oeiras, Sebastião José de Carvalho e Melo, 1st Marquis of Pombal. Landi acted as an amateur naturalist, drawing for the first time the Amazonian flora and fauna. He settled in Belém and became a member of the Third Order of Saint Francis, a membership restricted to European members of wealth and prestige. He conducted further scientific expeditions on the rivers of the North region of Brazil, and became familiar with the indigenous peoples of the Amazon.

His manuscript on the natural history of the Amazon, Descrizione di varie piante, frutti, animali, passeri, pesci, biscie, rasine, e altre simili cose che si ritrovano in questa Cappitania del Gran Parà (ca. 1775), has been annotated by zoologists Nelson Papavero, Dantes Teixeira, and botanist Paulo Cavalcante and published by the Emilio Goeldi Museum of Pará. Landi is referred to as Antônio José Landi in most Brazilian publications.

Landi would become known for the urban plan of the city of Belém and designing or modifying nearly all of the buildings of the period. He outlined facades, buildings, a port, squares and other urban elements. Also according to Leandro Tocantins, "He never represented the abandonment of the cultural values that were part of his personality as a European man and, especially, as an Italian. On the contrary, his presence in Brazil – and in the more tropical Brazil that is the Amazon – meant the introduction of new technical and artistic forms and concepts to the region at that time, and the happy convergence of styles in vogue in Italy and Portugal, without forgetting the intimate correlation between architecture and the environment, a phenomenon that Landi had the sensitivity to perceive."

== Noted works ==
- Our Lady of Grace Cathedral (Catedral Nossa Senhora das Graças)
- Church of Saint John the Baptist
- Church and Convent of Mercy
- Church of Our Lady of Mount Carmel
- Chapel of the Third Order of Mount Carmel
- Church and Convent of Saint Antony and Chapel of the Third Order of Saint Francis
- Church and Former College of Saint Alexander
- Church of Our Lady of the Rosary
- Church of Saint Anne
- Hospital Real
- Lauro Sodré Palace
- Pombo Chapel
- Church of Santana
- Mansion of Antônio Lemos

Some of Landi's works in Belém were demolished or have been lost. They include the Chapel of Santa Rita (Capela de Santa Rita), located on Rua dos Mercadores, now known as Rua João Alfredo. It was built as an oratory for inmates of the municipal jailhouse.

The most comprehensive biography of Landi is due to the Portuguese historian Isabel Mayer Godinho Mendonça: António José Landi (1713/1791) - Um artista entre dois continentes, published in Lisbon in 2003.
