= Domenico De Angelis =

Italian painter

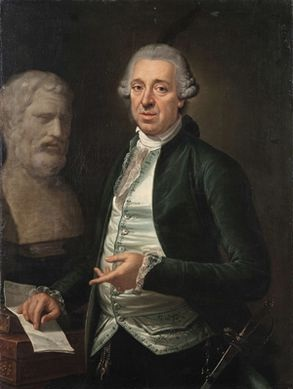
Pietro Labruzzi, Portrait of Domenico de Angelis with the bust of Bias of Priene, 1787

Domenico De Angelis (15 February 1735 – 10 March 1804) was an Italian painter of the Neoclassic period. Born Domenico Turreggia in Ponzano, he changed his name to De Angelis by 1750, when he moved to Rome with his brother Giuseppe.

== Biography ==
He is said to have received training from Marco Benefial. He won a prize in 1757 from the Accademia del Nudo (organized in the Campidoglio in 1754). In Rome in 1769, he married Domenico married Teresa, daughter of the landscape painter Paolo Anesi. In 1771, the Prince Marcantonio Borghese commissioned a series of frescoes depicting the Story of Hercules and Apollo for a ground floor hall in the Villa Borghese, Rome. In 1775–1776, he painted canvases with the Story of Galatea, and in 1779, the story of Troy for other rooms in the Villa. In 1774 he was named academic of the Accademia di San Luca. He was commissioned to decorate the Gabinetto delle Maschere for the Museo Pio-Clementino of the Vatican. He also worked as a restorer of classic Renaissance canvases. He became in 1795, the director of the Mosaic Studio of the Vatican. In 1797, he became director of the Accademia del Nudo. One of his pupils was Luigi Pichler.

There is a self-portrait on exhibit at the Accademia di San Luca in Rome. Among his works are an altarpiece in the Chapel of the Rosary of the Collegiata di San Nicola di Bari in Ponzano.

== Gallery of the Story of Troy, Villa Borghese ==
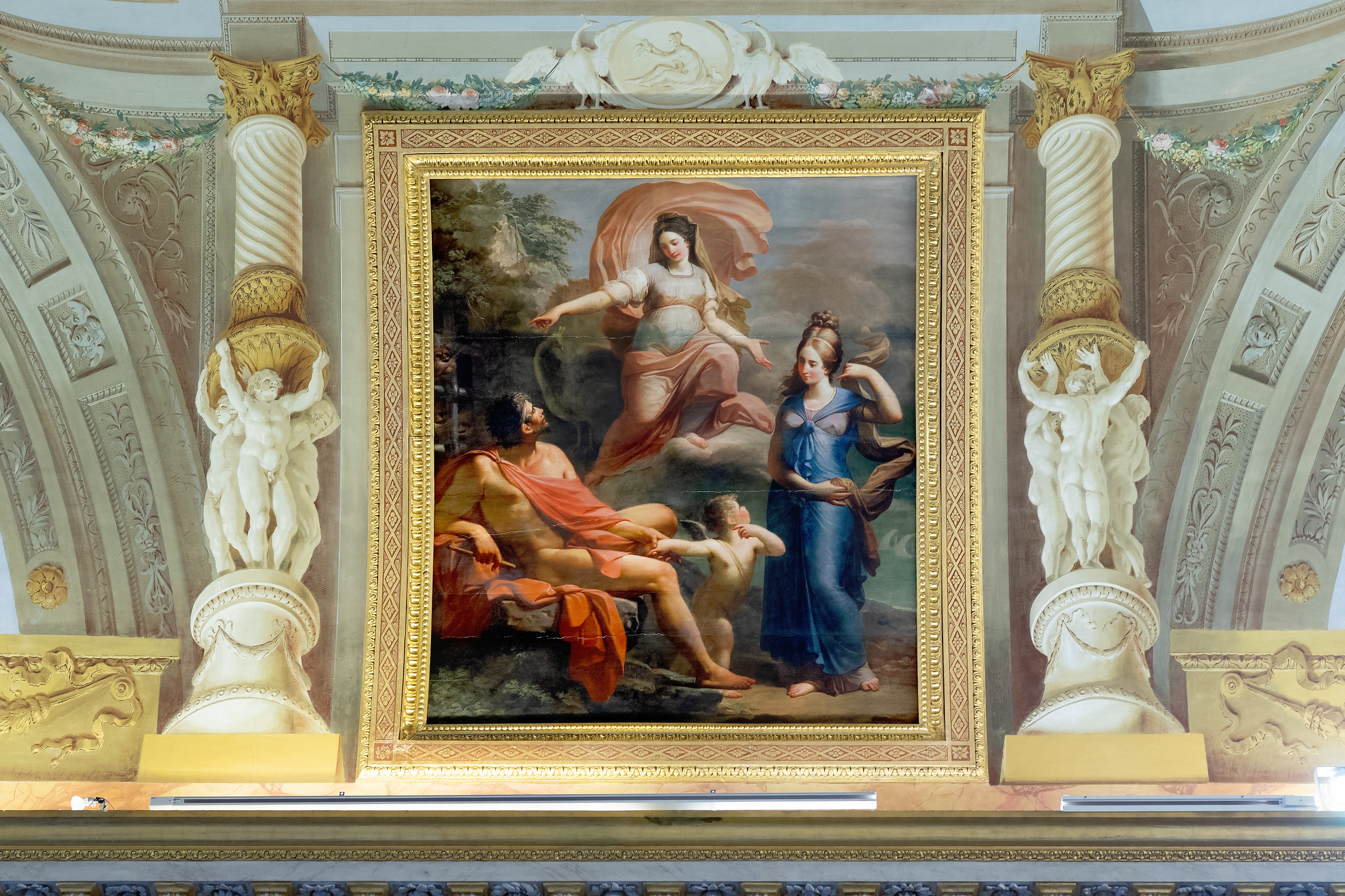

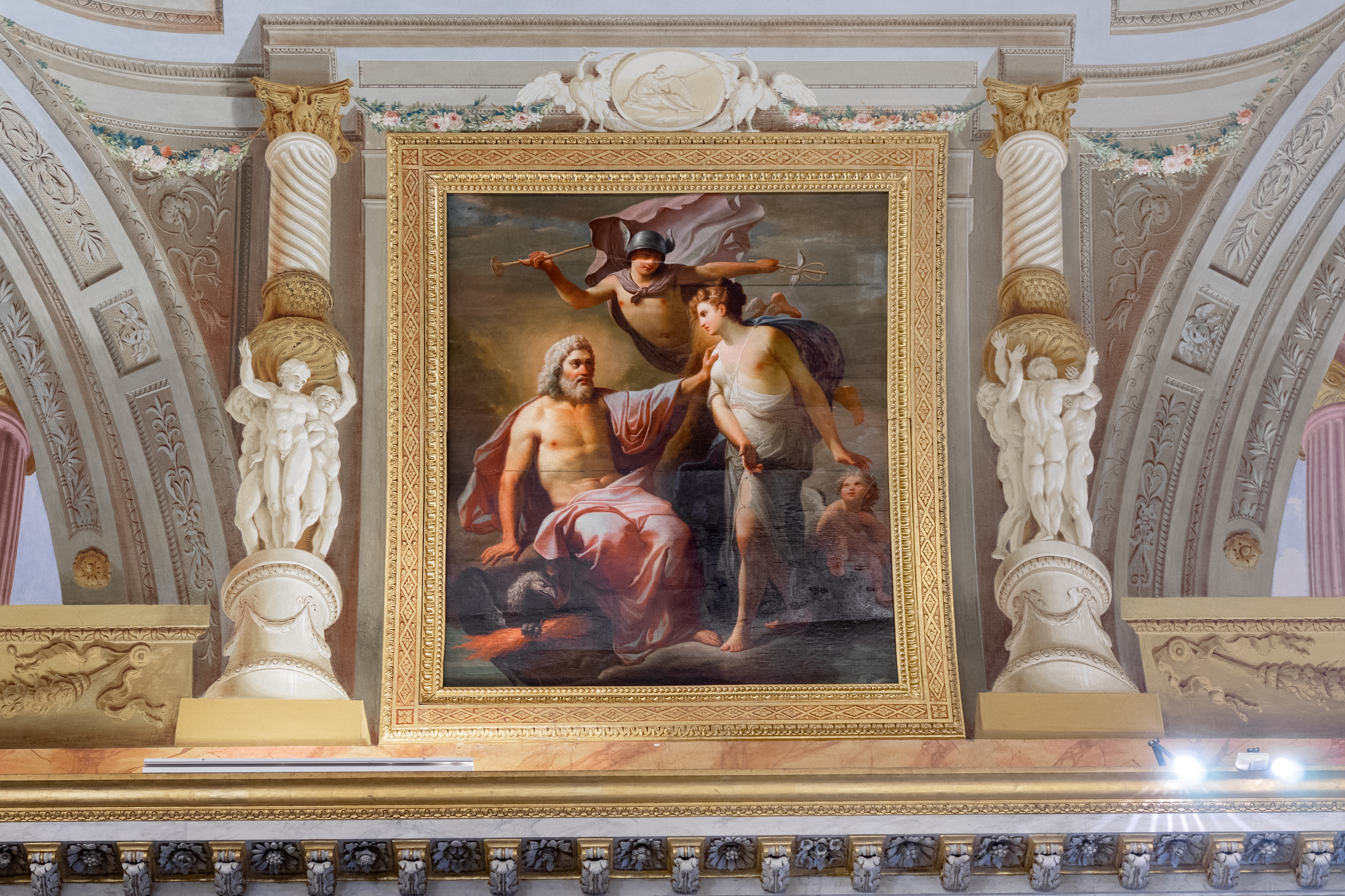

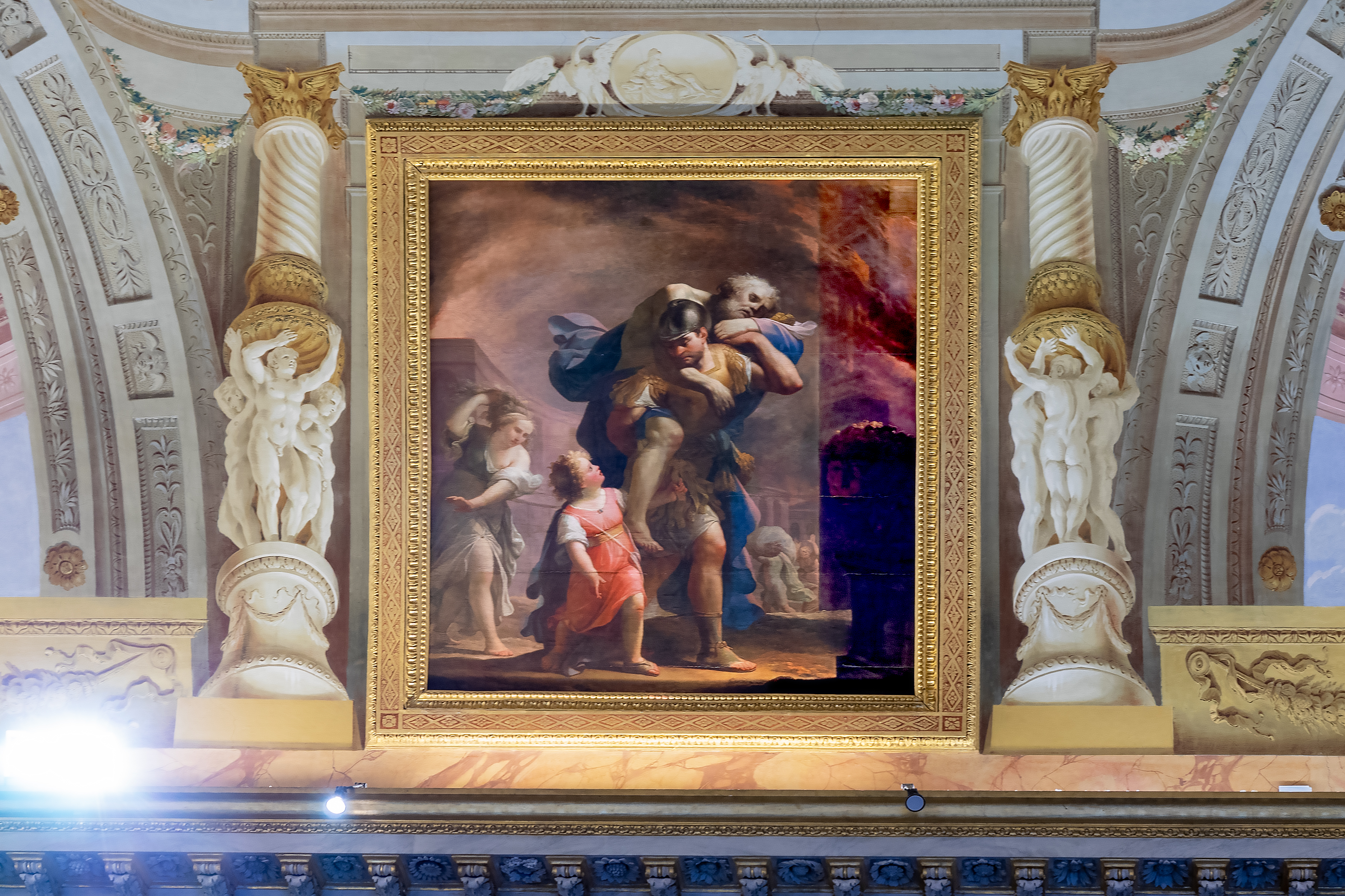

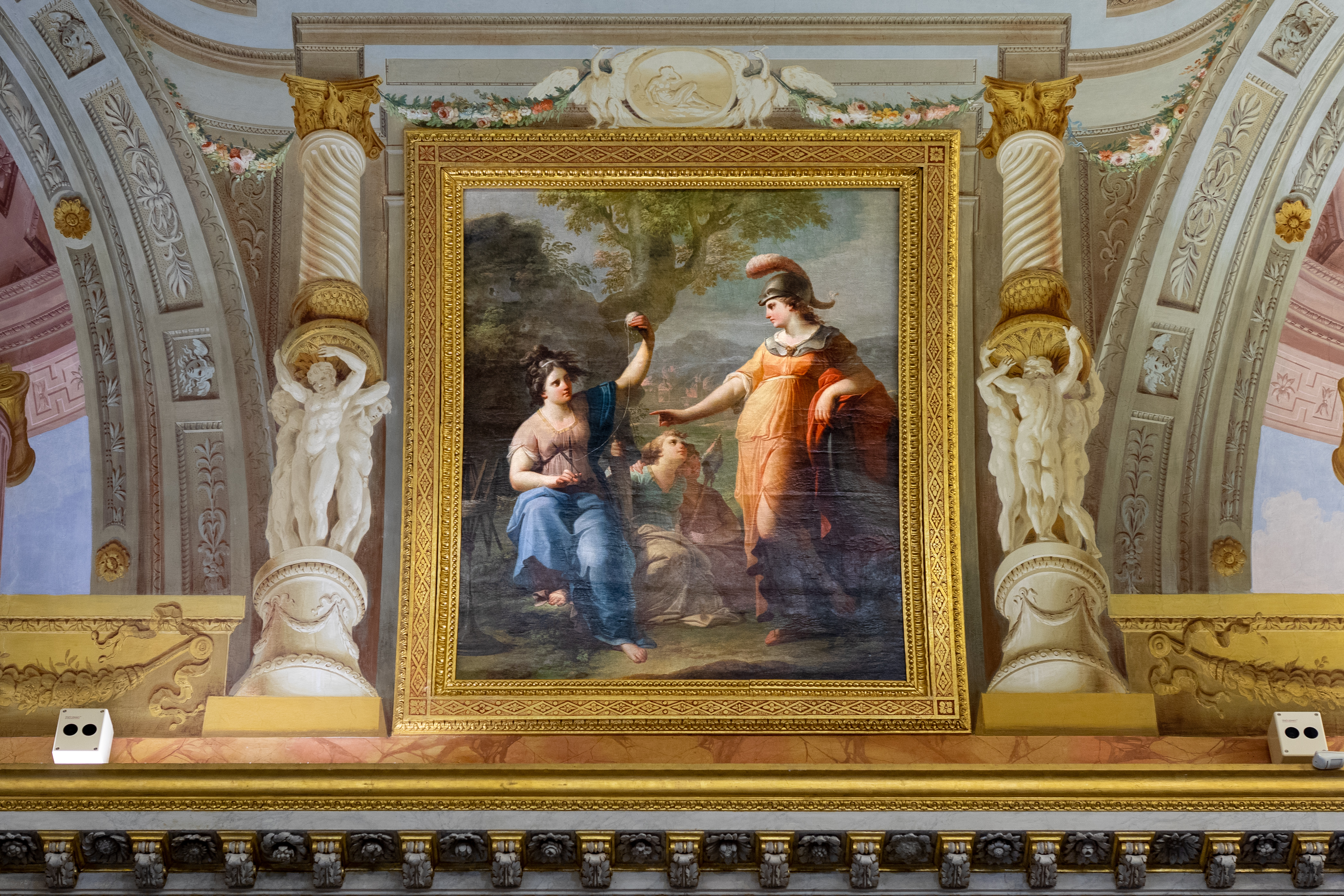
