= Church of Saint John the Baptist (Belém) =

Catholic temple in Brazil

- Igreja de São Joãozinho
- Igreja de São João Batista
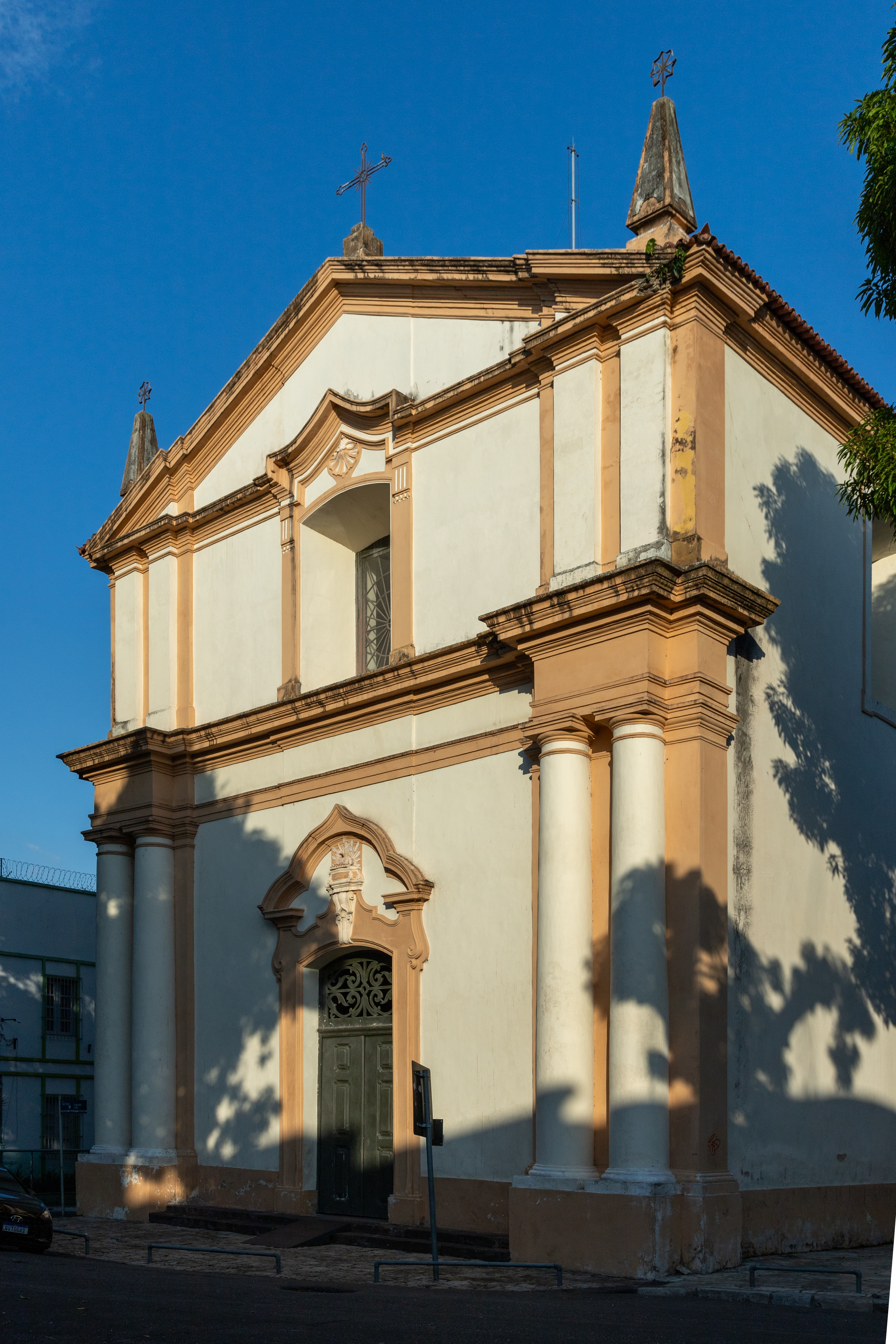
- Church facade
- Church of Saint John the Baptist
- 01°27′27″S 48°30′10″W
- Location: Belém, Pará; Brazil

Architecture
- Architect: Giuseppe Antonio Landi
- Architectural type: Baroque
- Completed: 1777; 249 years ago

Administration
- Archdiocese: Archdiocese of Belém do Pará

The Church of Saint John the Baptist (Portuguese: Igreja de São João Batista), also known as the Igreja de São Joãozinho, is a colonial temple located in Líbano Square, also known as Largo de São João, in the city of Belém, in the Brazilian state of Pará. Built in the Baroque style and designed by the Italian Giuseppe Antonio Landi, the small church has an irregular octagonal nave and a central dome. The building is protected by the National Historical and Artistic Heritage Institute (IPHAN).

The church has quadratura paintings, a technique exclusive to the Accademia di Belle Arti, a school located in Bologna, Landi's hometown. There were three canvases by the artist Francisco Figueiredo, but one of them has disappeared. The two that still remain depict the pilgrimage and beheading of the Saint John. Another peculiarity are the pictures depicting illusionary architecture, similar to altarpieces.

== History ==
A primitive straw-covered rammed earth building dating from 1622 was the origin of the current building. The church served as a prison for the Jesuit priest Antônio Vieira, who defended the indigenous cause during a popular uprising in 1661. In 1686 it was rebuilt in clay, in 1714 it became the Mother Church of Belém's only parish and in 1721 it became the cathedral for 34 years and the seat of the first three Bishops of Pará. The Church of Saint John the Baptist was built because the Sé Cathedral was under construction and closed for liturgical acts and there was no safe place to keep the Blessed Sacrament. The current project was designed by the Italian architect Giuseppe Antonio Landi; construction began in 1772 and was completed on June 24, 1777. In 1899, six Spanish Augustinian friars arrived and served in the church for 60 years. Later, in 1959, the diocesan priests took over the leadership of the temple.

=== Restoration ===
The project was carried out by IPHAN's 2nd Regional Coordination Office under the supervision of architect Elizabeth Soares, with João Velozo on its technical team. The work took ten months and included the restoration of the entire building, but after a few years, the church had already suffered a series of harmful interventions. For example, three altarpieces with neo-Gothic features were removed and deposited inside the temple by the Augustinian Order, who took over the chapel from 1899 to 1959. This collection, once properly dismantled, was sent to the Archdiocese of Belém. Around R$150,000 was spent on the complete restoration of the church, which was solemnly inaugurated in November 1996. The funds came from the National Program to Support Culture (PRONAC) and the Archdiocese of Belém, through donations received by the local town hall.

== Architecture and art ==
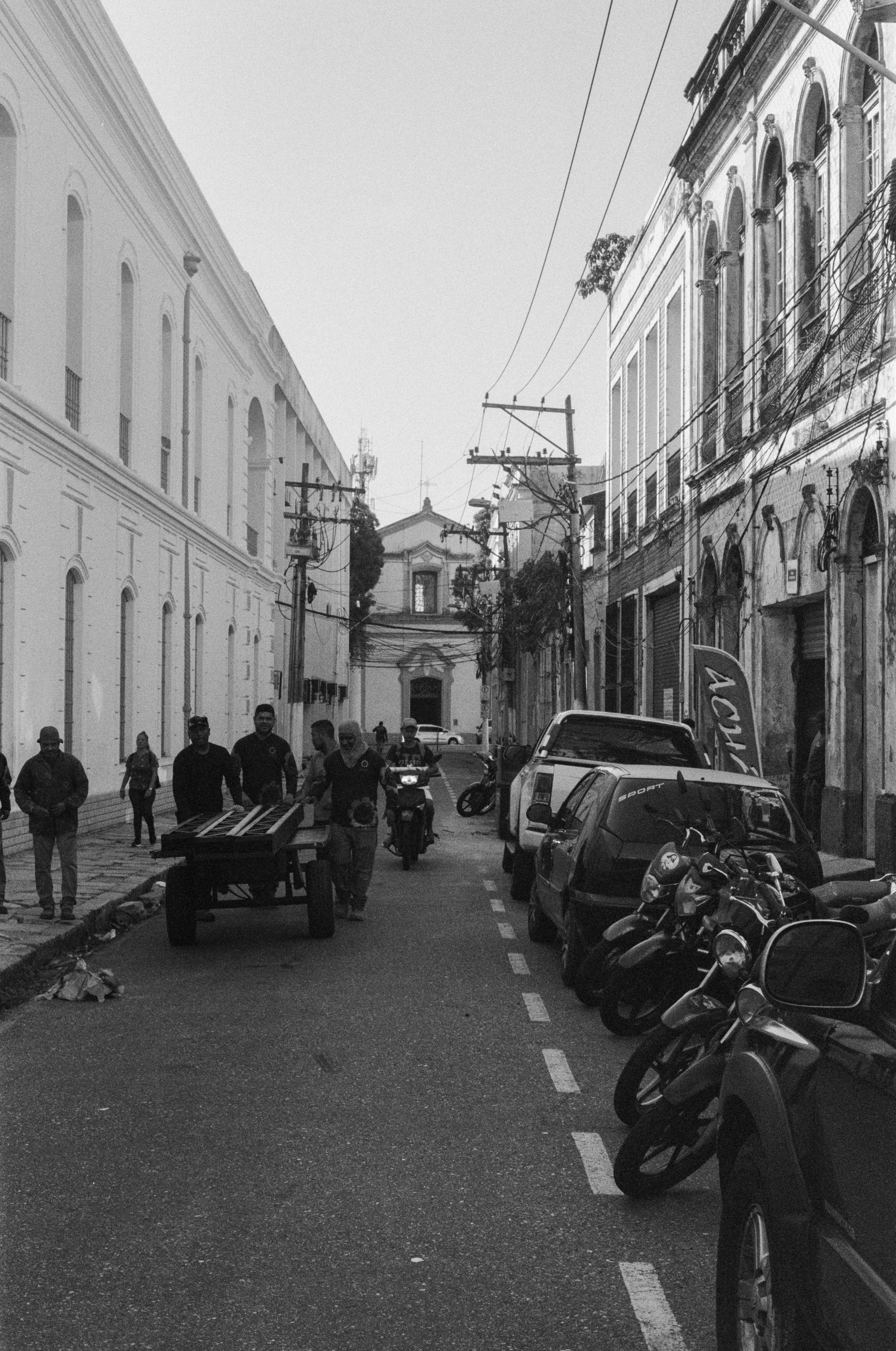
Church seen from Dona Tomázia Perdigão Street.

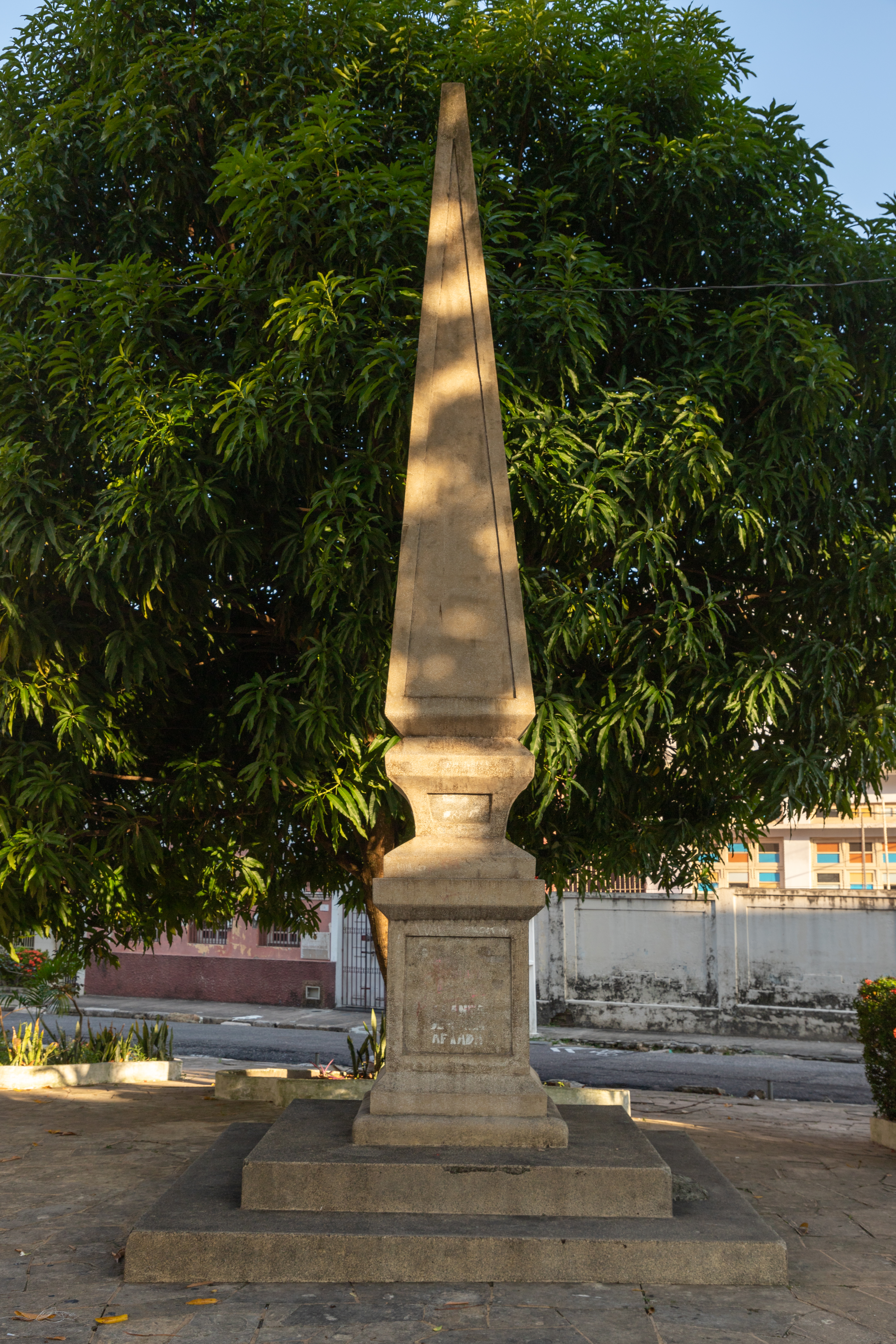
Pinnacle dedicated to Antonio Landi adjacent to the church, São João Batista Square.

The current building has a facade based on the classicizing Baroque style, a reference to the academic training of its author, Giuseppe Antonio Landi, who studied at the Accademia di Belle Arti. The floor plan - conceived as two overlapping squares, the larger being the nave, internally shaped like an irregular octagon, and the smaller being the main chapel, flanked by annexes - is the most distinctive feature of this 19th century project. The dome, one of the few examples in local architecture, follows the octagonal shape of the nave and has slit windows in four of its panels. Two altars, installed on the wider sides of the nave, display the trompe-l'œil paintings made by Landi in the 18th century.

Hidden for decades, they were located during a prospection in 1987 and recovered in 1996, restoring the pink and green tones that emulate marble. The drawings show Landi's characteristic motifs, indicative of his connection with the Bibiena family, renowned set designers in 19th century Europe. Garlands, vases of flowers and inverted volutes are combined with a lamp with the symbolism of the Holy Spirit, a motif found in other projects by the architect. Niches, balustrades and windows were carefully composed to accentuate the illusion of depth and non-existent openings, and natural lighting was calculated to emphasize the scenographic effects of this illusionist painting. On the high and side altars, two frames that would have been used to display paintings on canvas, both depicting the life of Saint John, have been preserved; a lost third panel also followed the same theme. They were done in Lisbon in 1774 by the Portuguese painter Francisco de Figueiredo.

== See also ==
- Basilica of Our Lady of Nazareth of Exile
