= Our Lady of Grace Cathedral, Belém =

Coordinates: 1.4500°S 48.5000°W

Our Lady of Grace Cathedral
- Catedral Nossa Senhora da Graça
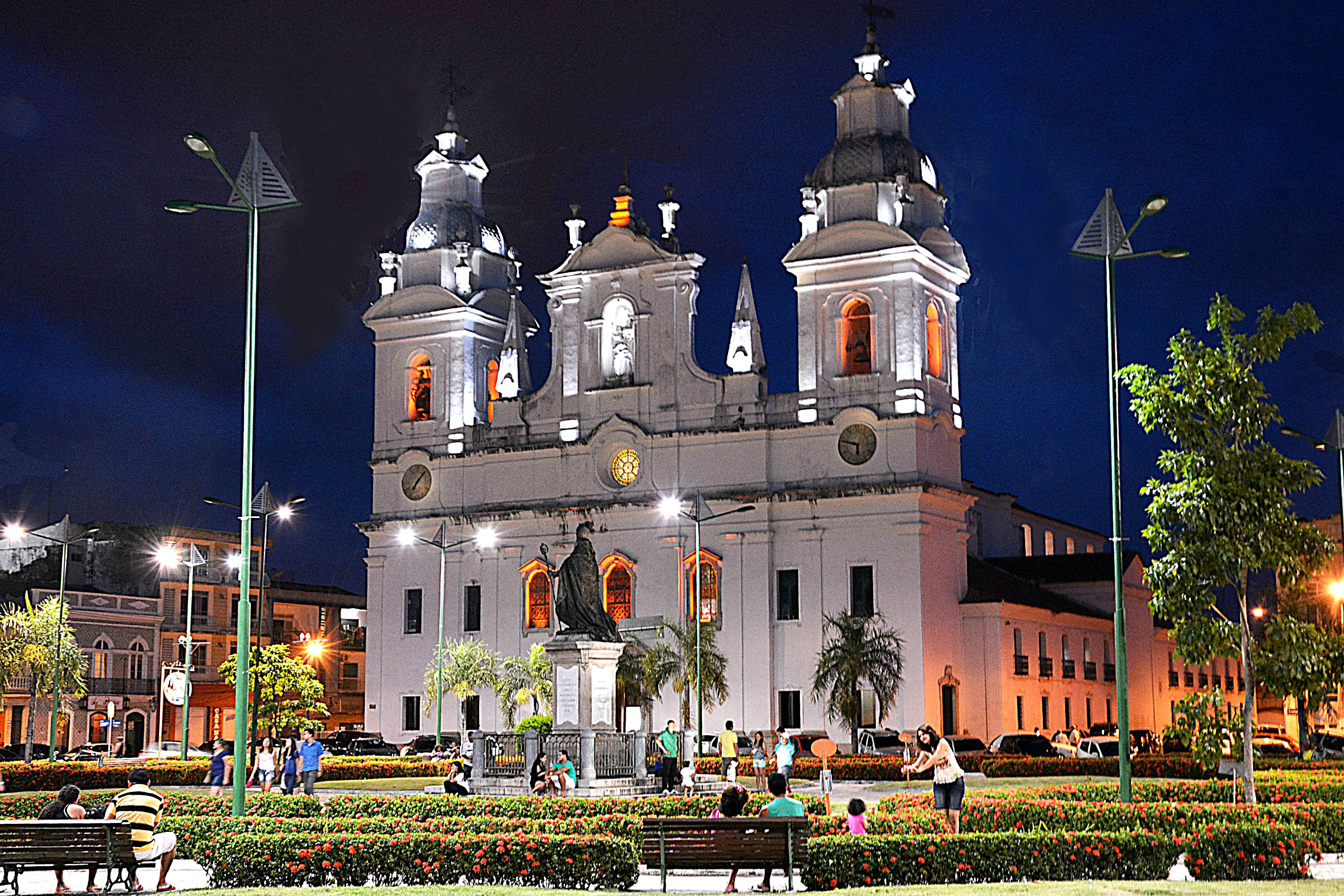
- Our Lady of Grace Cathedral
- Location: Belém
- Country: Brazil
- Denomination: Roman Catholic Church

Architecture
- Style: Baroque, Neoclassical architecture
- Completed: 1782

Administration
- Archdiocese: Roman Catholic Archdiocese of Belém do Pará

National Historic Heritage of Brazil
- Designated: 1940
- Reference no.: 234

The Our Lady of Grace Cathedral (Portuguese: Catedral Nossa Senhora das Graças) also called Catedral Nossa Senhora de Belém. It is the seat of the Roman Catholic Archdiocese of Belém do Pará and is located in the old quarter of the city in Belém in Brazil. The cathedral is dedicated to Our Lady of Grace, and dates to the earliest settlement of the Portuguese in Belém. The first chapel dedicated to Our Lady of Grace was a temporary structure inside the Presépio Fort; it was moved to a large square in front of the fort. The current structure, the third, was built in the Baroque style, but was later modified with numerous Neoclassical architecture elements by the architect João Landi (Giuseppe Antonio Landi). The cathedral was listed as a historic structure by the National Historic and Artistic Heritage Institute in 1940.

== History ==
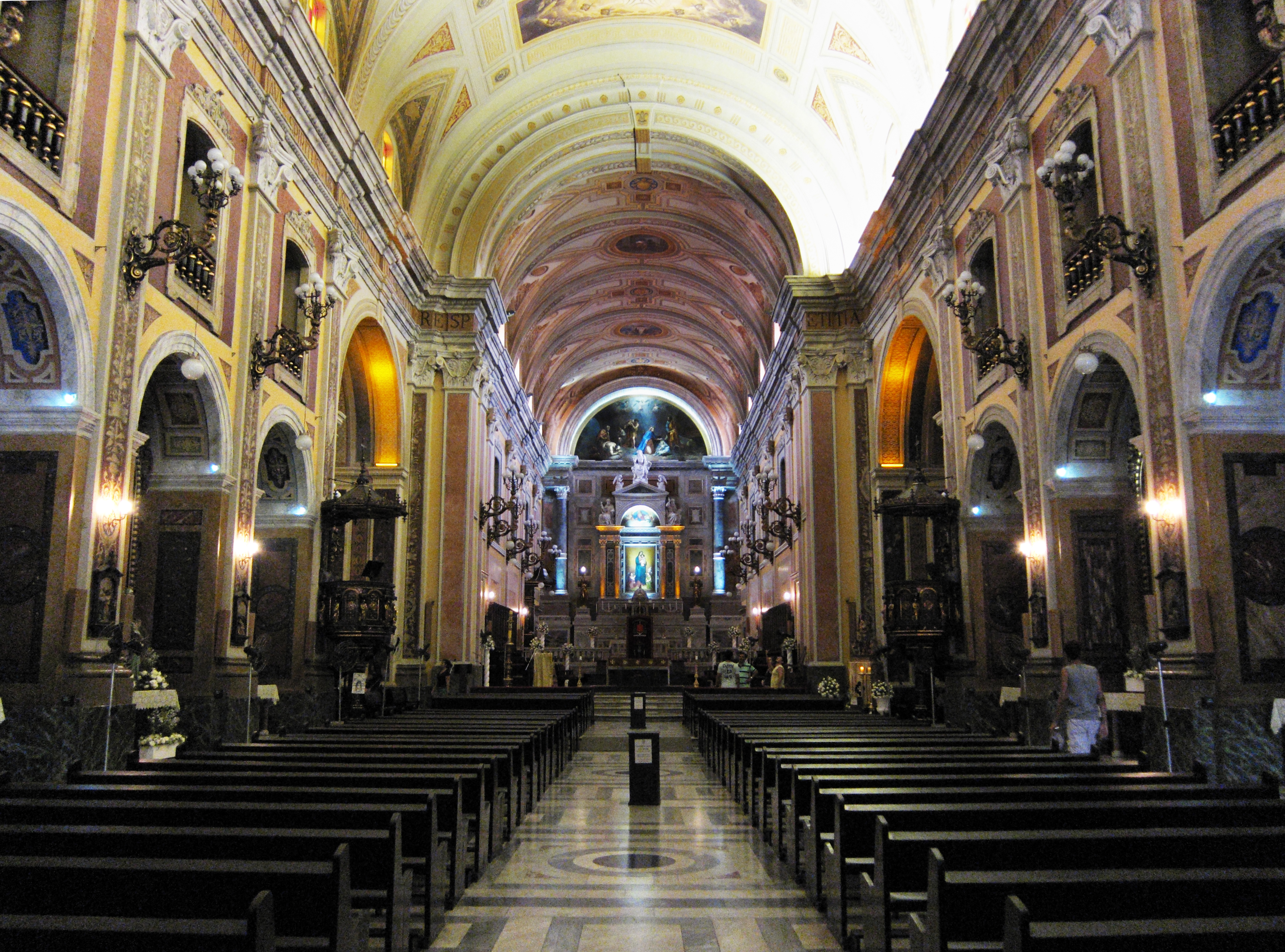
View of interior, Our Lady of Grace Cathedral

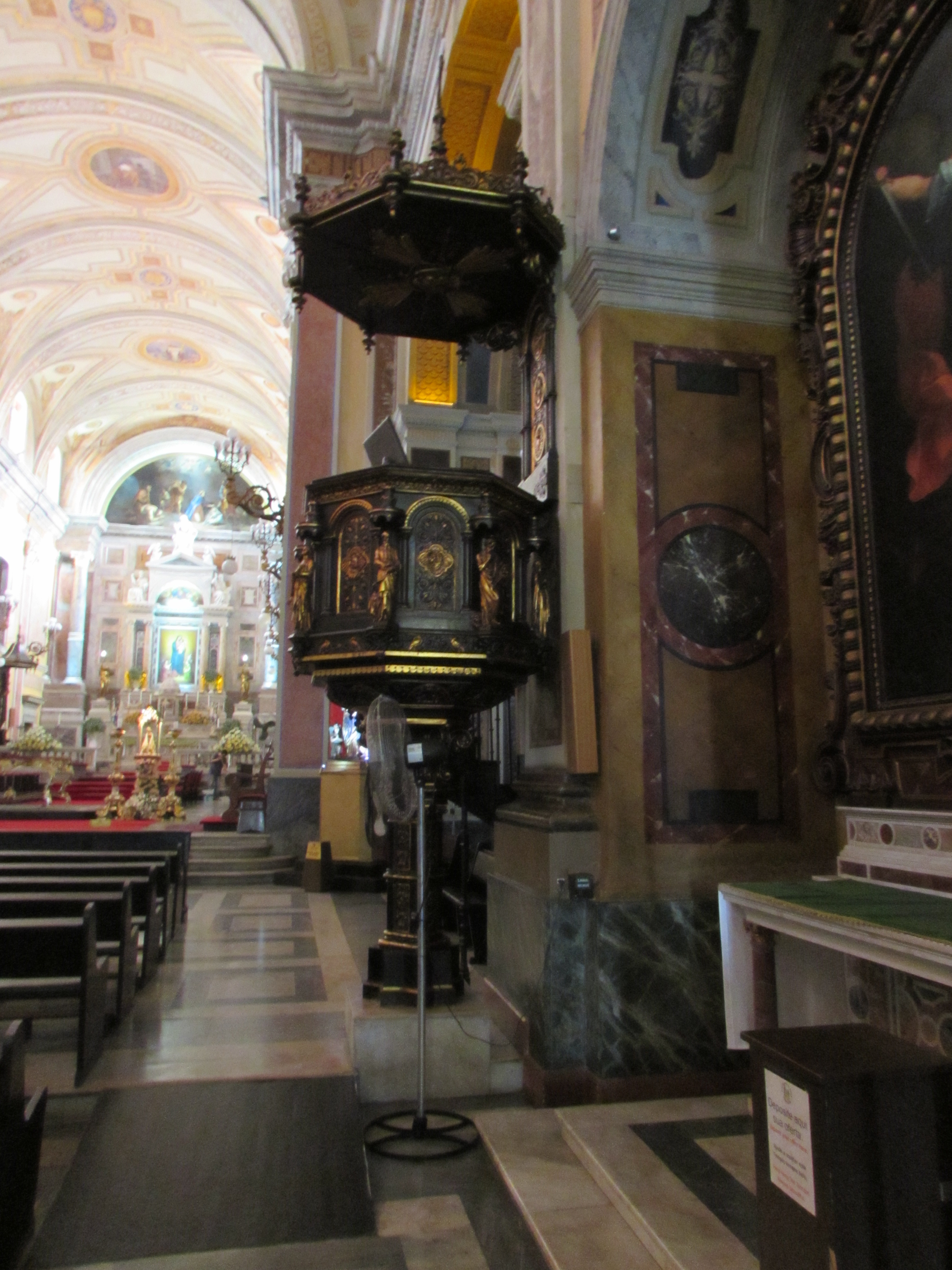
Baroque pulpits designed by Giuseppe Antonio Landi (João Landi), Our Lady of Grace Cathedral

The first chapel was built in Belém in the Presépio Fort (Forte do Presépio) in 1616. It was a temporary structure and was dedicated to Our Lady of Grace. A few years later it was transferred in the current Largo da Sé, where a poor, simple building was constructed. In the next century, in 1719, at the request of John V of Portugal dismembered the Diocese of Maranhão in 1719 and Belém became part of the newly created Diocese of Pará. The chapel dedicated to Our Lady of Grace was elevated to the rank of Cathedral in the same year, but the diocese required a cathedral. Work on the current building, built in the same place as the early church, began in 1748. The chancel arch was completed in 1755. The building to this point was designed in the baroque style common to the North and Northeast regions of Brazil.

The Bolognese architect João Landi (Giuseppe Antonio Landi, 1713–1791) modified many of the existing buildings in Belém after settling in the city. He took over construction of the cathedral, infusing it with both late Italian baroque and early Neoclassical design. Landi continued the cathedral from the cornice; he is primarily responsible for the upper façade of the structure. Landi designed a baroque-rococo wood altar; it framed an image of Our Lady of Grace by the Pedro Alexandrino de Carvalho (1729–1810). Landi is also noted for the elaborate, baroque-style pulpits. The doors of the sacristies are similarly in the baroque sylte. The clocks of the belltowers were imported from Europe and installed in 1772. Construction was completed in 1782.

Antônio de Macedo Costa (1830–1891) became the Bishop of Pará in 1861. He led a renovation of the interior of the Cathedral in the 1870s, primarily under a group of Italian artisans working in Belém and Manaus. They used Italian materials in the renovation and introduced techniques such as "scaiolla", a painting imitating marble, later known as escaiola in Portuguese. The high altar of Landi was removed. A new of high altar of marble and alabaster came from Rome as a gift from Pope Pius IX, in the neoclassical style by Leca Caprini in Italy. The side altars display paintings by Domenico de Angelins (1853–1900); they replaced works by Alexandrino de Carvalho completed in the previous century. Other Italians such as Giovanni Capranesi (1852–1921) and Silvio Centofanti worked in Belém and Manaus until the early 20th century.

== Structure ==
The floor plan of the cathedral is in the shape of a Latin cross. It has a single nave with side chapels and a "fairly deep" chancel.

=== Interior ===
The interior of the church is elaborate, with ten side altars, 28 bronze candelabra, stained glass windows, and a French organ from the 19th century. The wooden pulpits were designed by João Landi, and carved in an elaborate Manueline style. They are a key historical feature of the cathedral; they show elements similar to those of the cathedrals of the Middle Ages and Italian influence. The doors of the sacristies and of the Bishop are carved and gilded in the baroque style. The wall of the anteroom of the Bishop's sacristy has a baroque carving of Our Lady of Bethlehem. The side chapels are dedicated to Our Lady of Grace and the Santíssimo Sacramento. They are likewise in marble and designed in the same neoclassical style of the high altar.

== Protected status ==
Our Lady of Grace Cathedral was listed as a historic structure by the National Institute of Historic and Artistic Heritage in 1940. It was included in the Book of Historical Works as Inscription no. 145. The directive is dated January 3, 1941.

== Access ==
The cathedral is open to the public and may be visited.

== See also ==
- Roman Catholicism in Brazil
- Our Lady of Grace
- Dom Frei Caetano Brandão Square
- Church of Our Lady of Mount Carmel
