= Almir Gabriel =

Brazilian doctor and politician (1932–2013)

Almir José de Oliveira Gabriel
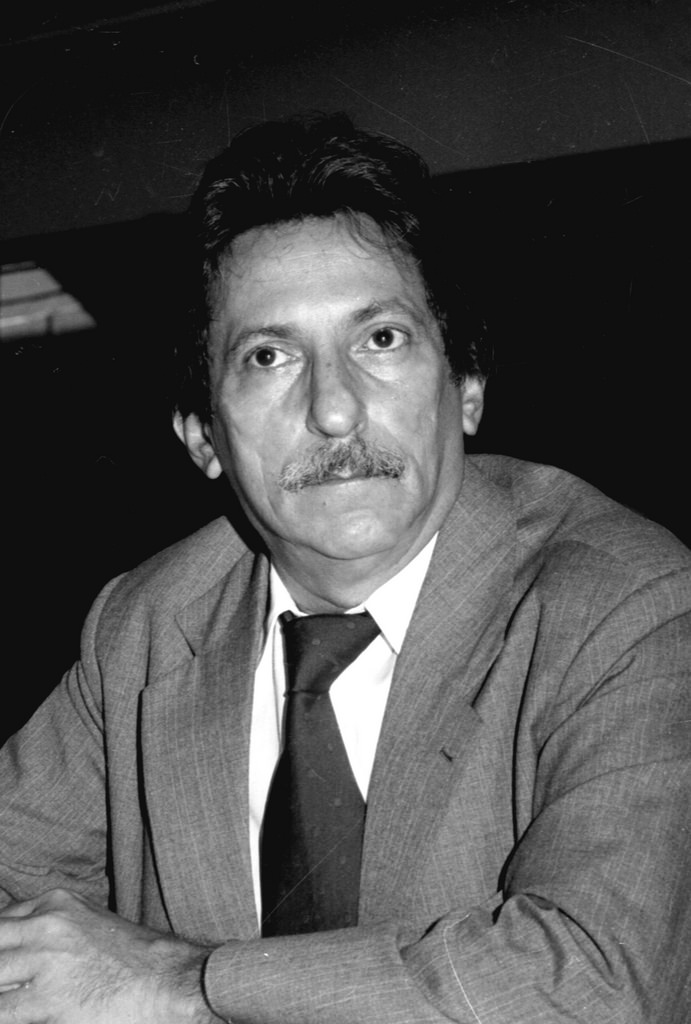

Governor of Pará
- In office January 1st, 1995 – January 1st, 2003
- Vice Governor: Hélio Gueiros Júnior (1995–1999); Hildegardo Nunes (1999–2003)
- Preceded by: Carlos Santos
- Succeeded by: Simão Jatene

Senator for Pará
- In office February 1, 1987 – January 1, 1995

Mayor of Belém
- In office August 29, 1983 – January 1, 1986
- Preceded by: Sahid Xerfan
- Succeeded by: Fernando Coutinho Jorge

State Secretary of Health of Pará
- In office March 1979 – August 1983

Personal details
- Born: August 18, 1932 Belém, Pará; Brazil
- Died: February 19, 2013 (aged 80) Belém, Pará; Brazil
- Party: ARENA (1966–1979); PDS (1980–1984); PMDB (1984–1988); PSDB (1988–2011); PTB (2011–2013)
- Education: Federal University of Pará
- Occupation: Doctor and politician
- Awards: Order of Military Merit

Almir José de Oliveira Gabriel COMM (August 18, 1932 – February 19, 2013) was a Brazilian doctor and politician affiliated to the Brazilian Labor Party (PTB). He was governor of Pará for two terms, senator and mayor of the capital Belém.

== Biography ==
Almir Gabriel is the son of Inácio Cúri Gabriel and Palmira de Oliveira Gabriel and was born in Belém do Pará on August 18, 1932. In 1956, he graduated in medicine from the Federal University of Pará (UFPA). During his undergraduate studies, he participated in the student movement as president of the academic directory and as vice-president of the União Acadêmica Paraense. After graduating, he became a doctor at Petrobras and began a specialization course in thoracic surgery at the National Tuberculosis Service in Rio de Janeiro, which he completed in 1958.

After returning to Belém, he headed the João de Barros Barreto University Hospital between 1962 and 1965, known as the Barros Barreto Sanatorium at the time. In 1966, he specialized in cardiovascular surgery at the Cardiology Institute of the São Paulo State Department of Public Health and Social Assistance. In 1971, he returned to the direction of the Barros Barreto Sanatorium, where he remained for another five years. In 1975, he took courses in national security and development at the Associação dos Diplomados da Escola Superior de Guerra (ADESG) in Belém.

Almir Gabriel was married to Maria do Socorro França Gabriel, with whom he had four children, and died on February 19, 2013, in Belém at the age of 80 from multiple organ failure after suffering from pulmonary emphysema and heart insufficiency.

== Political career ==
In 1977, Almir Gabriel began his political career after being appointed director of the National Division of Sanitary Pneumology at the Ministry of Health, where he remained until 1979. In 1978, he also assumed the position of interim secretary of the National Secretariat for Special Health Programs. Later, he was hired by Governor Alacid Nunes to occupy the office of Secretary of Health of Pará, between March 1979 and September 1983.

In 1983, he was appointed mayor of Belém by Governor Jader Barbalho. In the same year, he drafted the bill that created the Parliamentary Welfare Institute in Belém, which guaranteed a pension to councillors after eight years in office. He joined the Brazilian Democratic Movement Party (PMDB) the following year and left the mayor's post in January 1986.

In the November 1986 elections, Almir Gabriel was elected senator for the PMDB with 463,774 votes and became eligible to attend the National Constituent Assembly (ANC), responsible for drafting Brazil's 1988 Constitution. Sworn in on February 1, 1987, he was appointed by PMDB leader Mário Covas as rapporteur for the Social Order Commission, which dealt with issues related to workers' rights, health, security, the environment and minorities. In the same year, he was a member of the Systematization Committee and an alternate member of the Subcommittee on Science and Technology and Communication, the Committee on the Family, Education, Culture and Sports, Science and Technology and Communication of the ANC.

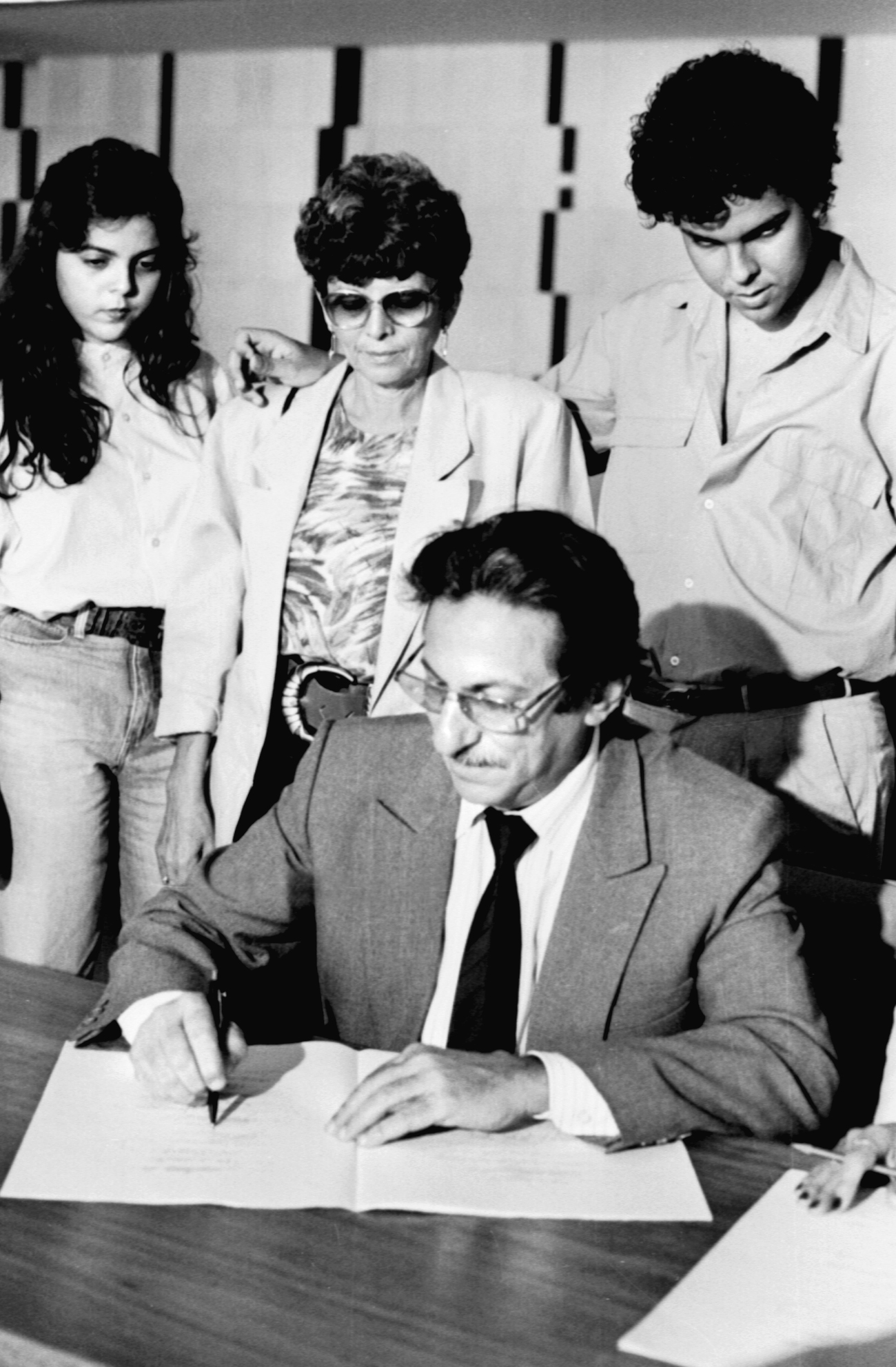
Senator Almir Gabriel, with his wife and children, signing the Constitution on September 29, 1988.

During the debates in the Constituent Assembly, Almir Gabriel supported the rupture of diplomatic relations with countries that carried out policies of racial discrimination, the collective injunction, the 40-hour working week, the six-hour non-stop shift, proportional prior notice, the nationalization of the subsoil, the limitation of real interest rates to 12% per year, the prohibition of the blood trade, the creation of a fund to support agrarian reform and the expropriation of areas considered productive for the purposes of agrarian reform.

He was also against the legalization of jogo do bicho, the five-year term of President José Sarney, presidentialism and the oil distribution monopoly. After the promulgation of the Constitution on October 5, 1988, he resumed his regular legislative work in the Senate, serving as general rapporteur of the Joint Budget Committee in the same year.

In 1989, he joined the Brazilian Social Democracy Party (PSDB), an organization formed in June of the previous year as a result of the discontent of some parliamentarians with the outcome of the Constituent Assembly votes. In the direct elections for President of the Republic in November, he was the candidate for vice-president on Mário Covas' (PSDB) platform. With a total of 7,790,392 votes (11.51% of the valid votes), he came fourth, behind Fernando Collor de Melo, of the National Reconstruction Party (PRN), Luiz Inácio Lula da Silva, of the Workers' Party (PT) - who went on to the second round in December, when Collor was victorious - and Leonel Brizola, of the Democratic Labor Party (PDT).

In 1990, Almir Gabriel ran for governor of the state of Pará on the Frente Popular Novo Pará Coalition, the result of an alliance between the PSDB, the Brazilian Socialist Party (PSB), the Brazilian Communist Party (PCB), the Communist Party of Brazil (PCdoB), the PDT and the PT. He came third with 230,242 votes (16.28% of the valid votes) and resumed his mandate as senator. In July 1994, Gabriel was awarded the Order of Military Merit by President Itamar Franco with the rank of Special Commander.

In 1994, Almir Gabriel ran again for governor of Pará in a PSDB coalition with the Liberal Front Party (PFL), PDT, Brazilian Labor Party (PTB), Popular Socialist Party (PPS), PSB, PCB and PCdoB. In the first round, Almir Gabriel came second with 458,000 votes (37.21% of the valid votes) against 471,165 votes for Jarbas Passarinho (PPR). In the second round, Almir Gabriel obtained the support of the PT, whose candidate, Valdir Ganzer, had come third in the first round, and won 870,827 votes (62.73% of the valid votes), winning the election. He took office on January 1, 1995, and in his first month, he requested federal funds to complete major projects, such as the Trans-Amazonian Highway and the Tucuruí Dam.

In the 1998 elections, Almir Gabriel ran for re-election on the União pelo Pará Coalition formed by PSDB, PTB, PPS, Brazilian Progressive Party (PP), Liberal Party (PL), Green Party (PV), Social Christian Party (PSC), National Mobilization Party (PMN), Social Democratic Party (PSD) and Avante (PTdoB). He received 773,185 votes (44.54% of the valid votes) and proceeded to the second round alongside runner-up Jader Barbalho. In the second round, Almir Gabriel received 981,409 votes (53.89% of the valid votes) and won the election for governor of Pará.

After four years out of public life, Almir Gabriel ran again for the government of Pará in the 2006 elections, with Valéria Pires Franco as his vice-governor candidate. União pelo Pará, his coalition, included 15 parties: PSDB, PFL, PTB, PSC, PL, PV, PTdoB, PMN, PP, Party of the Nation's Retirees (PAN), Brazilian Labour Renewal Party (PRTB), Humanist Party of Solidarity (PHS), Christian Labor Party (PTC), Progressive Republican Party (PRP) and Reconstruction of the National Order Party (PRONA). The election was decided in the second round; Ana Júlia Carepa received 54.92% of the votes (1,673,648 votes) and defeated Gabrial, who received only 45.07% of the valid votes (1,373,474 votes).

In 2009 Almir Gabriel left the PSDB and in 2011 he joined the PTB, where he was mentioned as a candidate to run for mayor of Belém in the 2012 elections. However, he never ran.

=== Electoral efficiency ===
Year	Election	Coalition	Party	Position	Votes	Percentage	Result
1986	State	No coalition	PMDB	Senator	463 774	-	Elected
1989	Federal	No coalition	PMDB	Vice-president	7 790 392 (4º)	11,51%	Not elected
1990	State	PSDB, PSB, PCB, PCdoB, PDT and PT	PSDB	Governor	230 242 (3º)	16,28%	Not elected
1994	State	PSDB, PFL, PDT, PTB, PPS, PSB, PCB and PCdoB	PSDB	Governor	458 000 (2º - first round) 870 827 (1º - second round)	37,21% (first round) 62,73% (second round)	Elected
1998	State	PSDB, PTB, PPS, PPB, PL, PV, PSC, PMN, PSD and PTdoB	PSDB	Governor	773 185 (1º - first round) 981 409 (1º - second round)	44,54% (first round) 53,89% (second round)	Elected
2006	State	PSDB, PFL, PTB, PSC, PL, PV, PTdoB, PMN, PP, PAN, PRTB, PHS, PTC, PRP and PRONA	PSDB	Governor	1 370 272 (1º - first round) 1 373 474 (2º - second round)	43,82% (first round) 45,07% (second round)	Not elected

== Controversies ==
Almir Gabriel became internationally known for the Eldorado do Carajás Massacre, one of Brazil's main agrarian conflicts, which took place during his first term as governor of Pará in 1996. In the event, the Pará State Military Police were ordered to clear the road between Marabá and Parauapebas, obstructed by around 3,500 landless workers. The confrontation between the police and the protesters left 19 dead (many of them with signs of execution), and 80 injured (69 landless and 11 police officers). Although he was never held formally responsible for what happened, Almir Gabriel was identified by the Landless Workers' Movement (MST) as the mastermind, since he allegedly ordered the road to be cleared by violent force.

== See also ==
- List of mayors of Belém
