= Edmilson Rodrigues =

Brazilian politician

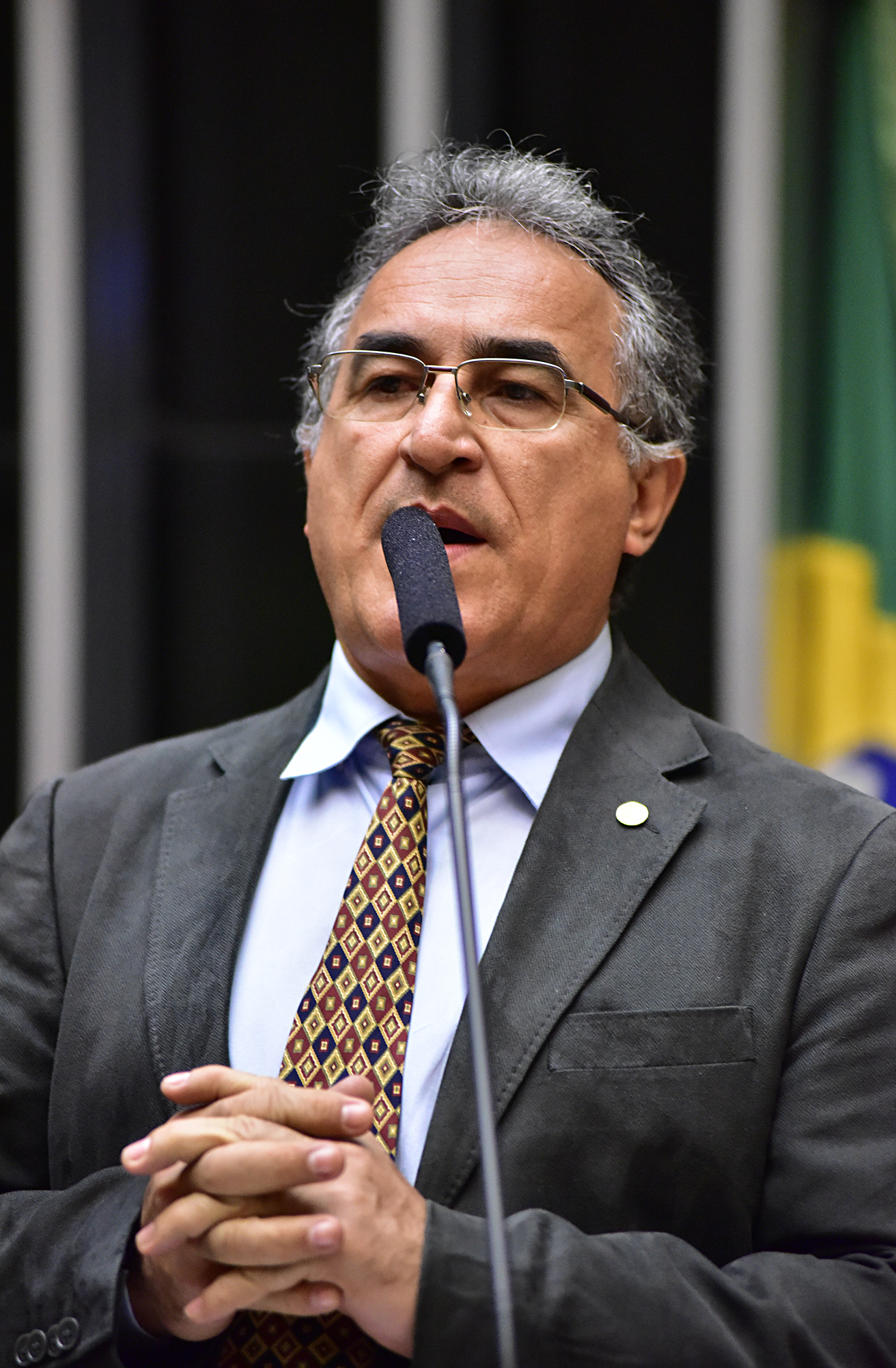

33th Mayor of Belém
- In office 1 January 2021 – 1 January 2025
- Vice Mayor: Edilson Moura
- Preceded by: Zenaldo Coutinho
- Succeeded by: Igor Normando
- In office 1 January 1997 – 1 January 2005
- Vice Mayor: Ana Júlia Carepa (1997–2001); Valdir Ganzer (2001–2005)
- Preceded by: Hélio Gueiros
- Succeeded by: Duciomar Costa

Member of the Chamber of Deputies
- In office 1 February 2015 – 1 January 2021
- Constituency: Pará

Member of the Legislative Assembly of Pará
- In office 1 February 2011 – 1 February 2015
- Constituency: At-large
- In office 1 February 1987 – 1 February 1995
- Constituency: At-large

Personal details
- Born: Edmilson Brito Rodrigues; 26 May 1941 (age 85) Belém, Pará, Brazil
- Party: PSOL (since 2005)
- Other political affiliations: PT (1986–2005)
- Occupation: Architect

Edmilson Brito Rodrigues (born 26 May 1957) is a Brazilian politician who served as mayor of Belém, Federal Deputy and State Deputy for the State of Pará. He is a member of the Socialism and Liberty Party (PSOL), previously having been a member of the Workers' Party (PT).

== Political career ==
From 1997 to 2005, Rodrigues served as mayor of Belém.

As a Federal Deputy, first elected in 2015, Rodrigues did not support the impeachment process against then-president Dilma Rousseff.

He returned to municipal politics in the 2020 Brazilian municipal elections, presenting himself once again as a candidate for mayor of Belém. With around 52% of the votes, he was elected to the position.

== See also ==
- List of mayors of Belém

Political offices
Preceded by Hélio Gueiros	Mayor of Belém; 1997–2005	Succeeded by Duciomar Costa
Preceded by Zenaldo Coutinho	Mayor of Belém; 2021–present	Incumbent
