= Hélio Gueiros =

Brazilian politician (1925–2011)

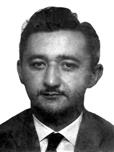
- Gueiros in 1967

Personal details
- Born: 12 December 1925 Fortaleza, Brazil
- Died: 15 April 2011 (aged 85) Belém, Brazil

Hélio Gueiros (12 December 1925 – 15 April 2011) was a Brazilian politician who served as the Governor of Pará from 1987 to 1991. He also served as the Mayor of Belém from 1993 to 1996.

== Biography ==
Gueiros worked as a journalist and lawyer before entering politics in the 1950s. He became a Pará state representative in the 1960s. He also served as a congressman in the Chamber of Deputies for three consecutive terms in office.

Gueiros left politics for approximately ten years during the Brazilian military government. He served as a Senator in the Senate of Brazil from 1983 to 1987. Gueiros then served as the governor of Pará from 1987 until 1991.

Gueiros became the Mayor of Belém, the capital city of Pará, from 1993 to 1996. In 2004, Gueiros unsuccessfully ran again for Mayor of Belém in the mayoral election.

Gueiros died from renal disease at his home in Belém, Brazil, on 15 April 2011, at the age of 85. His memorial service was held at the Palácio Lauro Sodré, the former seat of government in Pará. Gueiros was buried at the Recanto da Saudade cemetery. He was survived by his wife, Terezinha.

== See also ==
- List of mayors of Belém
