= List of mayors of Belém =

The following is a list of mayors of the city of Belém, Pará state, Brazil.

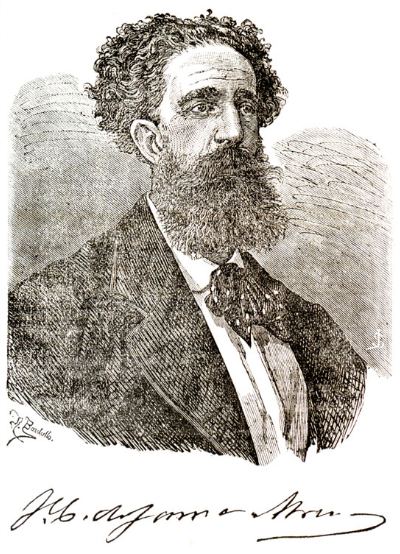
Portrait of José Coelho da Gama, Intendente Municipal (mayor) of Belém, 1891-1894

- José Coelho da Gama, 1891-1894
- Antonio Joaquim da Silva Rosado, 1894-1897
- Antônio Lemos, 1897-1911
- Henrique Sabino da Luz, 1911-1912
- Virgílio Martins Lopes Mendonça, 1912-1913
- Dionísio Bentes, 1913-1914
- Antônio Martins Pinheiro, 1914-1921
- Antônio José Ó de Almeida, 1921
- Cipriano José dos Santos, 1921-1922
- Sabino Silva, 1922-1923
- José Olímpio Barroso Rebêllo, 1923-1924
- Manoel Waldomiro Rodrigues dos Santos, 1924-1926
- Antônio Crespo de Castro, 1926-1928
- José Maria Camisão, 1928-1929
- Antonio Faciola, 1929-1930
- José Carneiro da Gama Malcher, 1930, 1933-1934
- Leandro Pinheiro, 1930-1932
- Abelardo Condurú, 1932-1933, 1936-1943
- Ildefonso Almeida, 1934-1935
- Ismael de Castro, 1935
- Venerando de Freitas Borges, 1935-1936
- Jerônimo Cavalcante, 1943
- Emauel Ó de Almeida Morais, 1943
- Alberto Engelhard, 1943-1945
- Augusto Serra, 1945-1946
- Euclides Cumaru, 1946
- Manoel Figueiredo, 1946-1947
- Teivelindo Guapindaia, 1947
- Estórgio Meira Lima, 1947-1950
- Waldir Bouhid, 1950-1951
- Rodolfo da Silva Santos Chermont, 1951
- Lopo Alvarez de Castro, 1951-1953, 1957-1961
- Celso Cunha da Gama Malcher, 1953-1957
- Luiz Geolás de Moura Carvalho, 1961-1964
- Alacid Nunes, 1964-1965
- Osvaldo Sampaio Melo, 1965-1966
- Stélio Maroja, 1966-1970
- Mauro Fernando Pilar Porto, 1970-1971
- Nélio Dacier Lobato, 1971-1974
- Octávio Bandeira Cascaes, 1974-1975
- Ajáx Carvalho de Oliveira, 1975-1978
- Luiz Felipe Machado de Sant'Ana, 1978-1980
- Lorewal Rei de Magalhães, 1980-1983
- Sahid Xerfan, 1983, 1989-1990
- Almir Gabriel, 1983-1985
- Fernando Coutinho, 1986-1988
- Manoel Rezende, 1990-1992
- Hélio Gueiros, 1993-1996
- Edmilson Rodrigues, 1997-2004
- Duciomar Costa, 2005-2012
- Zenaldo Coutinho, 2013-2021
- Edmilson Rodrigues 2021-2025
- Igor Normando 2025 -

== See also ==
- Antônio Lemos Palace (city hall), in the Cidade Velha bairro
- Timeline of Belém
- List of mayors of largest cities in Brazil (in Portuguese)
- List of mayors of capitals of Brazil (in Portuguese)
