= Bibi Costa Mansion =

Palacete Bibi Costa
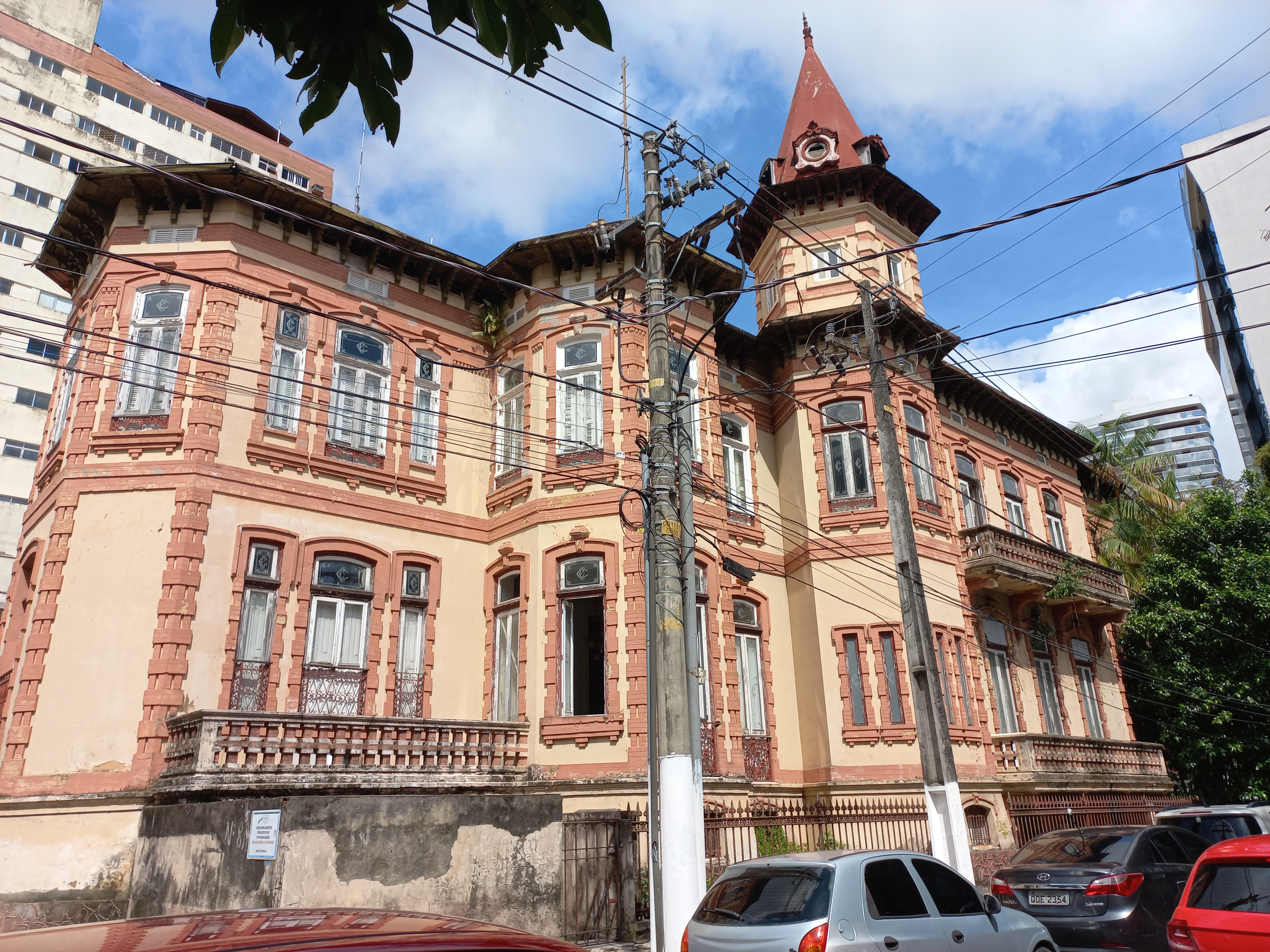

- Location within Brazil

General information
- Type: mansion
- Architectural style: Eclectic
- Location: Avenida Governador José Malcher nº 1192 - Nazaré, Belém-PA, Pará, Belém, Pará, Brazil
- Coordinates: 1.450292°S 48.483128°W
- Inaugurated: 1903
- Owner: Federal University of Pará

Design and construction
- Architect: Filinto Santoro

The Bibi Costa Mansion (Portuguese: Palacete Bibi Costa), also known as José Júlio de Andrade Mansion, or simply O Castelinho, is a historic residence in Belém, Pará, Brazil. It was built for José Júlio de Andrade (1862–1953), a politician, merchant, and plantation owner, and completed in 1906 by in "record time" to welcome the president of Brazil, Afonso Pena, to Belém. The mansion is part of a set of large homes built in Belém in the eclecticism during the Amazonian "rubber cycle" in the early 20th century. It is now owned by the Waterway Administration of the Eastern Amazon (Administração Hidroviária da Amazônia Oriental) of the Federal Government of Brazil. It was listed as a historic structure by the Department of Historic, Artistic and Cultural Heritage of Pará in 2002. It is now considered an "icon" of Brazil's belle époque eclectic architecture in Belém. The residence was built by the engineer Francisco Bolonha (1872–1938) who built numerous buildings for the government of Belém in the early 20th century. The mansion is also noted for Bolonha's pioneering use of reinforced concrete, which was largely unknown in either Brazil or Belém in the period.

== Location ==
The Bibi Costa Mansion is located on the corner of Rua Joaquim Nabuco and Avenida Governador José Malcher, in the Nazaré neighborhood. The neighborhood was created during the government of Antônio Lemos (1897-1911) and was home to the elite of Belém. The mansion once sat on a larger plot of land, but it is greatly reduced due to several changes of owners since its construction.

== History ==
The Bibi Costa Mansion was built by Francisco Bolonha, an engineer who built numerous buildings for the government of Belém. Bolonha studied at the Rio de Janeiro Polytechnic and was familiar with both local conditions of Belém and European building techniques. Bolonha made many trips to Europe and was an admirer of Gustave Eiffel. Bolonha built a series of eclectic-style private residences along Rua Governador José Balcher. The Bibi Costa Mansion "heralds the strong verticalization Bolonha would imprint as a mark of his private residence on Governador José Malcher Street." Bolonha utilized reinforced concrete in the mansion. The technique was rare in Brazil, and especially rare in Belém. Bolonha, lacking source materials, used tram lines rails for structural reinforcement of the concrete slab; they remain in the house to this day. Construction on the mansion began in 1904 and ended in 1906. The building was used shortly for the State Planning Secretariat of Pará.

== Structure ==
The Bibi Costa Mansion is built in the eclectic style, with three stories above ground and a basement. It has two façades, the main one facing Avenida Governador José Malcher. The mansion also has numerous towers, a signature of Bolonha's design. The mansion, like others in the ensemble, is marked by a Neoclassical symmetry and a restrained decoration. The balconies along the façade have balustrades; the mortar moldings imitate brick facings; the ornamental bronze sculptures and cast iron gates are in the Art Nouveau style.

The house was arranged along social lines familiar from the colonial period in Brazil: the ground floor was used for social and general business functions; the second floor was reserved for private use by the family; and servants were confined to the basement. The second floor had a terrace with mosaics, but it no longer exists. The two turrets are primarily decorative, without a defined function.

== Alleged haunted status ==
José de Andrade owned rubber plantations in the interior of Pará and was noted for his cruelty towards his workers. He owned slaves long after the abolition of slavery in Brazil and used instruments of torture on his plantation. The mansion has a long history of being haunted, in connection with Andrade's cruelty on his plantations, with "dozens of testimonies of the noise of chains dragging across the floor, sudden screams, figures, and voices."

== Protected status ==
The Bibi Costa Mansion was listed as a historic structure by the Department of Historic, Artistic and Cultural Heritage of the state of Pará in 1996.

== Access ==
The mansion is not open to the public and may not be visited.
