= Alacid Nunes =

Brazilian politician (1924–2015)

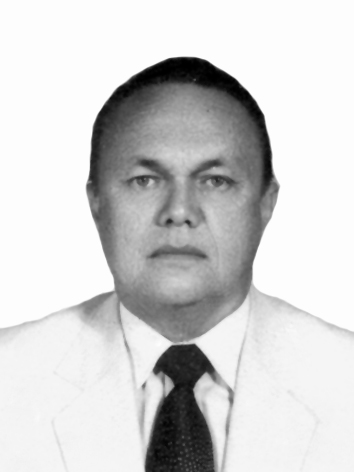

Governor of Pará
- In office 15 March 1979 – 15 March 1983
- Vice Governor: Gerson Peres
- Preceded by: Clóvis Rego
- Succeeded by: Jader Barbalho

Governor of Pará
- In office 31 January 1966 – 15 March 1971
- Preceded by: Jarbas Passarinho
- Succeeded by: Fernando José Leão Guilhon

Mayor of Belém
- In office 1964–1965
- Preceded by: Isaac Soares
- Succeeded by: Osvaldo Sampaio Melo

Personal details
- Born: 25 November 1924 Belém, Pará, Brazil
- Died: 5 September 2015 (aged 90) Marajó, Pará, Brazil
- Spouse: Marilda Nunes

Alacid da Silva Nunes (25 November 1924 – 5 September 2015) was a Brazilian politician and retired military commander and colonel. Nunes served as the governor of the Brazilian state of Pará for two nonconsecutive tenures: 1966 to 1971 and from 1979 until 1983. He also briefly served as the Mayor of Belém from 1964 to 1965 before leaving the office to successfully pursue his candidacy for Governor of Pará.

Nunes graduated from the Academia Militar das Agulhas Negras in Rio de Janeiro and the Federal University of Pará. By 1960, Nunes was the commander of the Zona Militar Norte (Northern Military Zone), based in Recife. He was transferred in 1961 to the Federal Territory of Amapá (now a present-day Brazilian state) as the territory's Security Secretary. He then headed the 8Th Circunscrição de Recrutamento (28th Recruitment District), based in Belém, from 1961 to 1964.

Alacid Nunes was appointed Mayor of Belém in 1964, the same year as the 1964 Brazilian coup d'état and the installation of the Brazilian military government. He resigned from the mayor's office in 1965 to stand for election in the Pará gubernatorial election. Nunes was narrowly elected Governor of Pará as a candidate for National Democratic Union (UDN). He served as governor from 1966 until 1971. Nunes largely left politics from 1971 to 1974 to run a cement factory in Capanema, Pará.

Nunes served as a deputy in the federal Chamber of Deputies from 1975 to 1979. In 1979, Nunes was appointed to his old position of Governor of Pará. He served as Pará's appointed governor from 1979 to 1983.

In 1990, Nunes was elected to the federal Chamber of Deputies, where he served from 1991 to 1995.

Alacid Nunes died from a heart attack at his ranch in Marajó on 5 September 2015, at the age of 90. He was buried with full military honors in his family plot at the Cemitério Santa Izabel in the Guamá neighborhood of Belém.

== See also ==
- List of mayors of Belém
