= Jarbas Passarinho =

Brazilian politician

Senator for Pará
- In office 1 February 1987 – 1 February 1995
- In office 1 February 1967 – 1 February 1983
Further offices held
Minister of Justice
In office 15 October 1990 – 2 April 1992
President	Fernando Collor de Mello
Preceded by	Bernardo Cabral
Succeeded by	Célio Borja
Minister of Social Security
In office 11 November 1983 – 15 March 1985
President	João Figueiredo
Preceded by	Hélio Beltrão
Succeeded by	Waldir Pires
President of the Federal Senate
In office 24 February 1981 – 1 February 1983
Preceded by	Luís Viana Filho
Succeeded by	Nilo Coelho
Minister of Education
In office 3 November 1969 – 15 March 1974
President	Emílio Garrastazu Médici
Preceded by	Favorino Bastos Mércio
Succeeded by	Ney Braga
Minister of Labor
In office 15 March 1967 – 30 October 1969
President	Artur da Costa e Silva
Preceded by	Luís Gonzaga do Nascimento e Silva
Succeeded by	Júlio Barata
Governor of Pará
In office 15 June 1964 – 31 January 1966
Vice Governor	Agostinho Monteiro
Preceded by	Aurélio Correia do Carmo
Succeeded by	Alacid Nunes

Personal details
- Born: Jarbas Gonçalves Passarinho; 11 January 1920 Xapuri, Acre, Brazil
- Died: 5 June 2016 (aged 96) Brasília, Federal District, Brazil
- Party: UDN (until 1966); ARENA (1966–1980); PDS (1980–1993); PPR (1993–1995); PPB (1995–2003); PP (2003–2016)
- Spouse: Ruth de Castro Gonçalves (died 1987)
- Children: 5
- Education: Military School of Realengo

Military service
- Allegiance: Brazil
- Branch/service: Brazilian Army
- Years of service: 1939–1967
- Rank: Colonel

Jarbas Gonçalves Passarinho (11 January 1920 – 5 June 2016) was a Brazilian military officer and politician. Passarinho began his political career when he was appointed Governor of Pará. He served as head of several government ministries during both the Brazilian military government (1964–1985) and the transition to democracy. His government portfolios included Minister of Labor (1967–1969), Minister of Education (1969–1974), Minister of Social Security (1983–1985), and Minister of Justice (1990–1992). Passarinho was also a member of the Federal Senate, representing Pará for two tenures during military rule and the return to democracy, including a period as President of the Federal Senate from 1981 to 1983.

== Biography ==
Jarbas Passarinho was born on 11 January 1920, in Xapuri, Acre, to Inacio de Loiola Passarinho, a small business owner, and Julia Gonçalves Passarinho. He attended Escola Preparatoria de Cadetes de Porto Alegre and Escola Militar do Realango in Rio de Janeiro to prepare for a career in the Brazilian Army.

He was an army officer when the Brazilian Armed Forces seized power in 1964 and established the Brazilian military government, a military dictatorship which ruled the country from 1964 to 1985. He began his political career in Pará in 1964, when President Humberto de Alencar Castelo Branco, the country's first leader following the 1964 Brazilian coup d'état, appointed Passarinho as the Governor of Pará. Passarinho served as governor from 1964 to 1966, when he left the governor's office to take a seat in the Federal Senate. He would be succeeded in 1966 by his protege, Major Alacid Nunes.

He joined the National Renewal Alliance (ARENA), the party of the military government, after other political parties were disbanded in October 1965.

Passarinho stepped down as Governor of Pará in 1966 and was elected to the Federal Senate, also representing Pará, as a member of the National Renewal Alliance (ARENA), the official political party of the military government. In 1967, the same year that Passarinho retired from the Brazilian Army with the rank of colonel, President Artur da Costa e Silva appointed him as Minister of Labor, which he headed from 1967 to 1969. As Minister, Passarinho supported Institutional Act 5, December 1968 law which granted sweeping powers to the military regime.

President Artur da Costa e Silva suffered from deteriorating health throughout 1969 and left office in August 1969, just a few months before his death in December 1969. Costa e Silva's successor, President Emílio Garrastazu Médici, another military leader, who took office on 30 October 1969, asked Passarinho to become his Minister of Education soon after taking office. Passarinho headed the Ministry of Education November 1969 until March 1974. He remained in his seat as a member of the Federal Senate after leaving the Ministry of Education in 1974.

In August 1979, Passarinho helped to draft a political amnesty deal, which abolished the ruling National Renewal Alliance (ARENA) as well as the Brazilian Democratic Movement (MDB). Soon after, Passarinho co-founded the Democratic Social Party (PDS), a conservative political party.

He was elected President of the Federal Senate from 1981 to 1983. In 1983, President João Figueiredo, the last president during military rule, appointed Passarinho as his Minister of Social Security, a position he held from 1983 until the end of Figueiredo's government in 1985.

In November 1986, following the end of military rule, Passarinho was elected to the interim Brazilian Constituent Assembly from Pará as a member of the Democratic Social Party (PDS).

The country transitioned to a democracy during the late 1980s and early 1990s. In October 1990, after Passarinho had returned to the Senate, President Fernando Collor de Mello to his Cabinet as Minister of Justice, where he served from October 1990 until April 1992. Passarinho remained one of Collor de Mello's allies in the National Senate, but failed to stop the President's impeachment later in 1992. later retired from the Senate in 1995.

Passarinho joined the new Partido Progressista Brasileiro (PPB) in 1995 following the merger of the PPR and the PP political parties.

In a 2004 interview, Passarinho stated that the Brazilian military government should have relinquished power during the 1970s.

During his life, Passarinho received 17 honorary degrees and doctorates from various Brazilian universities.

Jarbas Passarinho, a longtime resident of Brasília, died in the city from health problems due to old age on the morning of Sunday, 5 June 2016, at the age of 96. The government of Brazil decreed three days of national mourning in Passarinho's honor. His funeral, with full military honors, was held at the Paróquia Militar do Oratório with burial at the Campo da Esperança cemetery in Brasilia. Dignitaries in attendance at the funeral included the head of the Institutional Security Cabinet, Army General Sérgio Etchegoyen, and Minister of the Supreme Federal Court Marco Aurélio Mello. Interim President Michel Temer, Chief of Staff of Brazil Eliseu Padilha, and other officials released statements praising Passarinho's contributions to the country.

Passarinho's wife, Ruth de Castro Gonçalves Passarinho, with whom he had five children, died in August 1987.
