= Igor Normando =

Brazilian politician (born 1987)

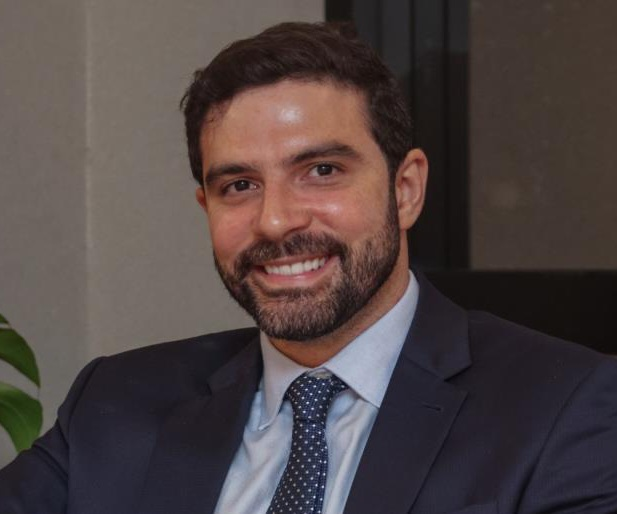
- Normando in 2025

Mayor of Belém
- Incumbent
- Assumed office 1 January 2025
- Preceded by: Edmilson Rodrigues

Personal details
- Born: 29 July 1987 (age 39)
- Party: Brazilian Democratic Movement (since 2024)

Igor Wander Centeno Normando (born 29 July 1987) is a Brazilian politician serving as mayor of Belém since 2025. From 2019 to 2024, he was a member of the Legislative Assembly of Pará. From 2023 to 2024, he served as secretary of citizenship of Pará. He is a fourth cousin of Helder Barbalho and Jader Barbalho Filho.
