= Belém =

Capital and largest city of Pará, Brazil

- Municipality
- Municipality of Belém
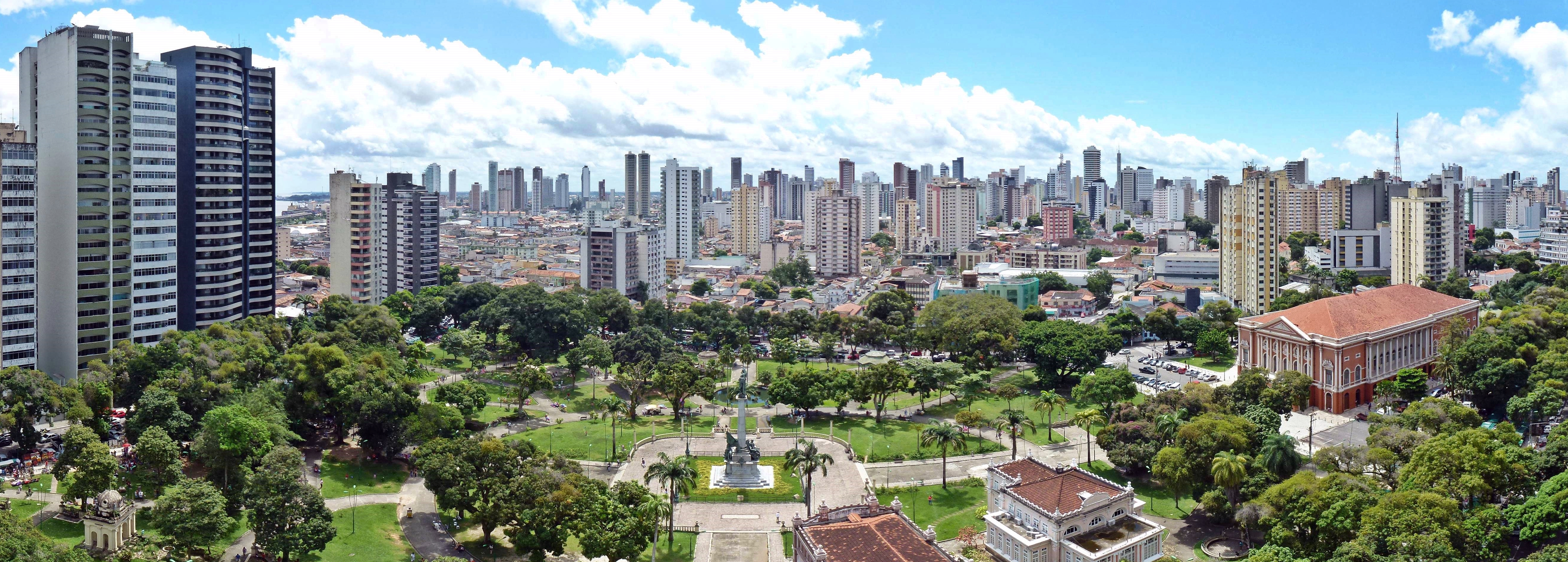
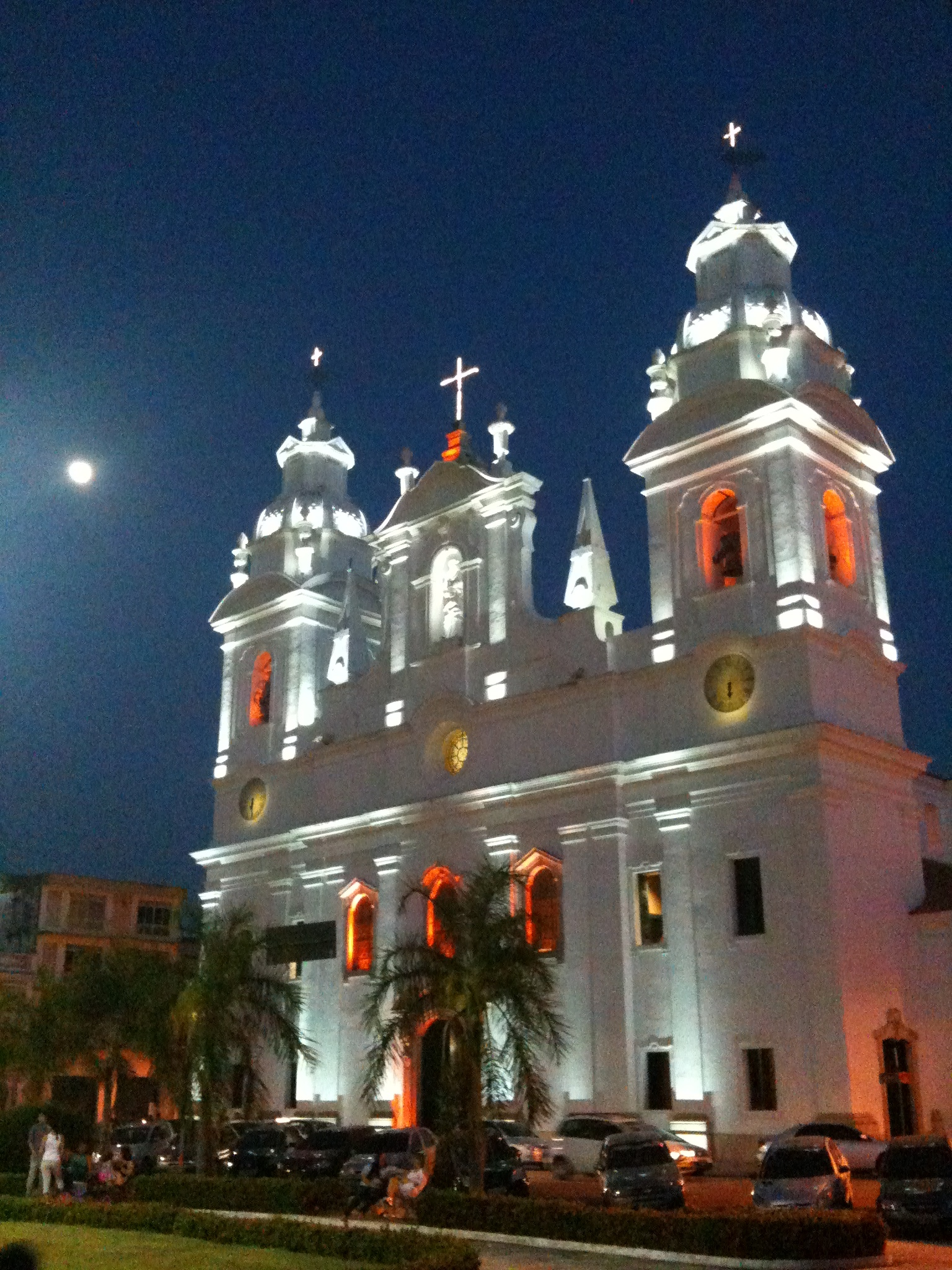
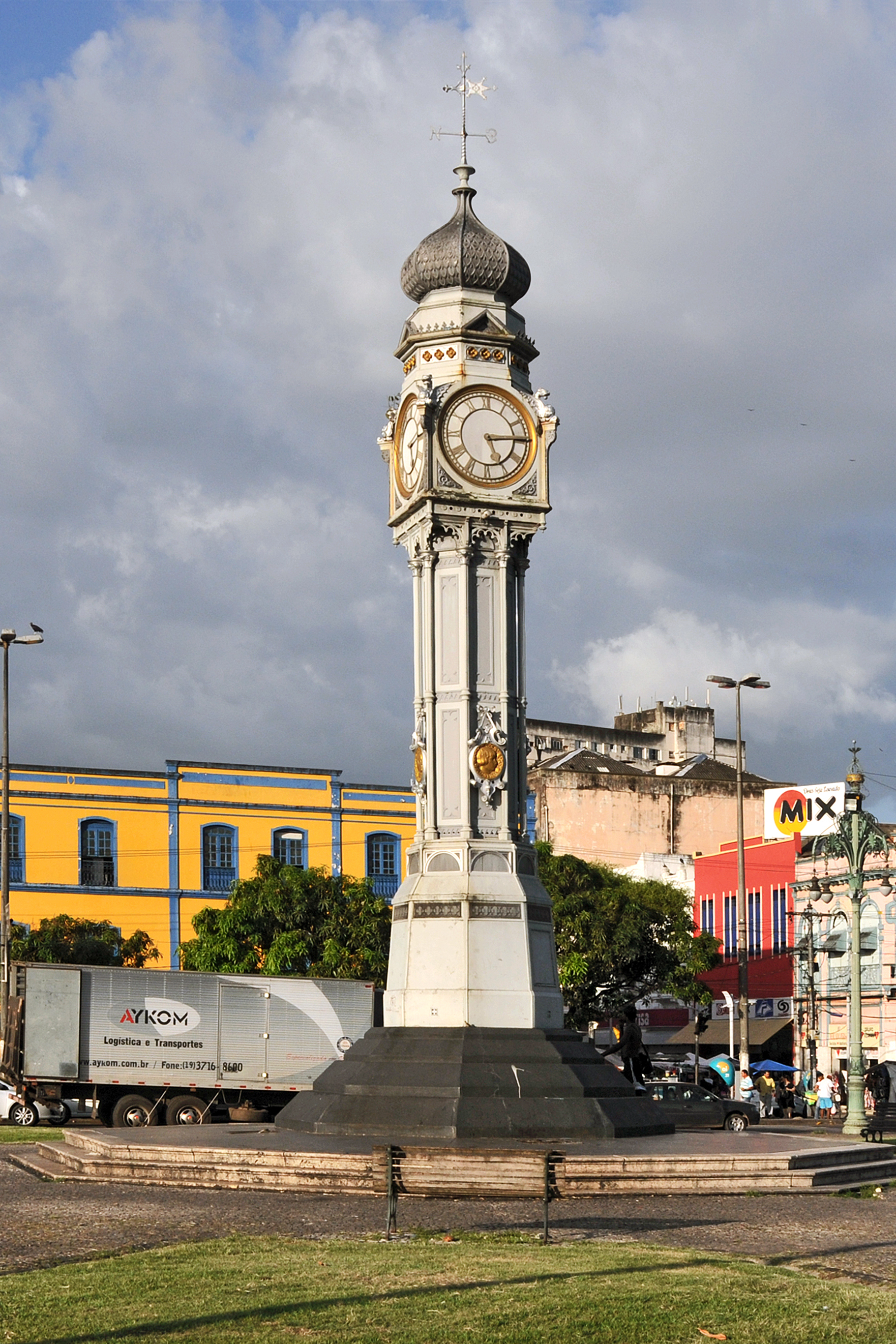
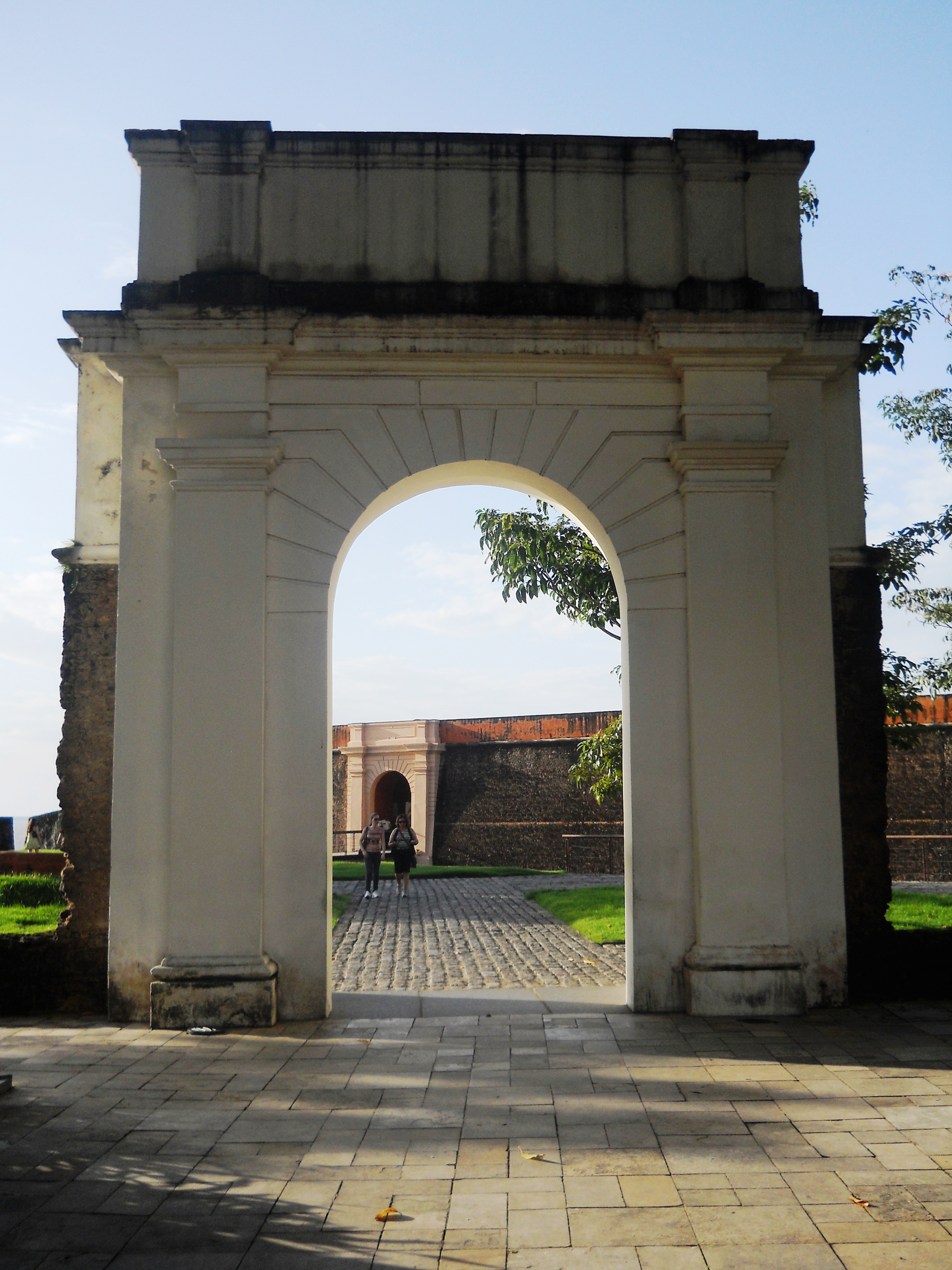
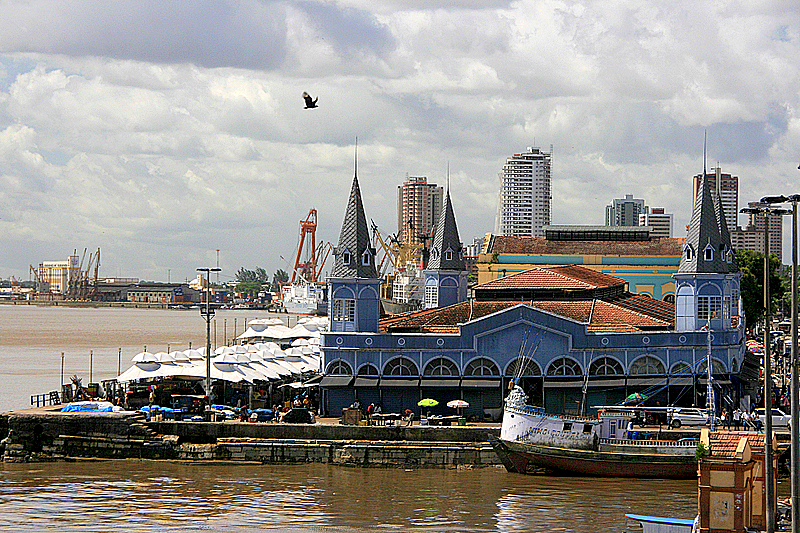
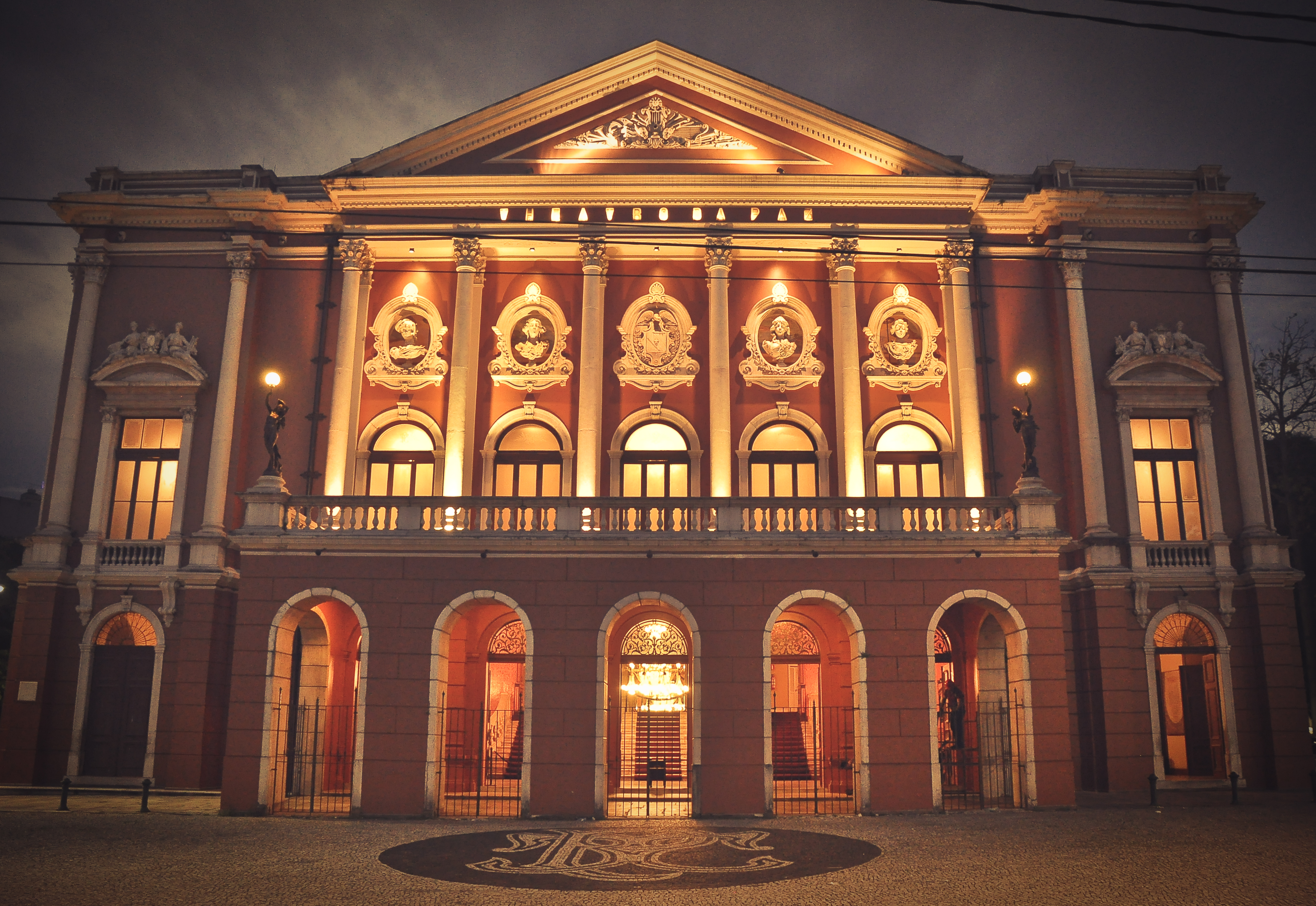
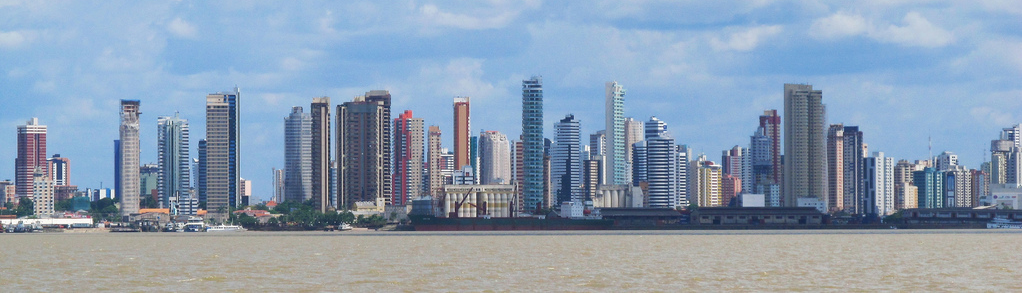
- Panoramic of the Republic Square in Downtown Our Lady of Grace Cathedral Siqueira Campos Square Forte do Presépio Ver-o-Peso Market Peace Theater View of the city from Guajará Bay

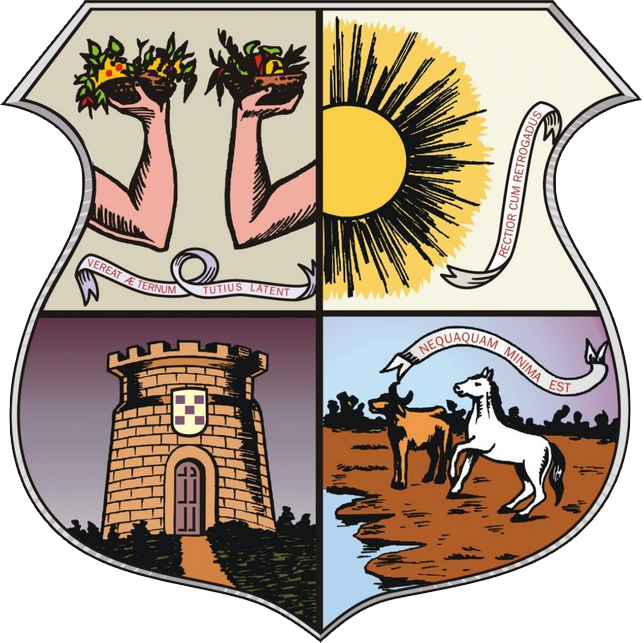
- Flag Coat of arms
- Nicknames: "City of Mango Trees", "Metropolis of the Amazon".
- Motto: Os Estados do Norte estão conosco e nos seguem (Northern states are with us and follow us)
- Location of Belém in the State of Pará

- Location in Brazil
- Coordinates: 01°27′21″S 48°30′14″W
- Country: Brazil
- Region: North
- State: Pará
- Founded: 12 January 1616

Government
  - Mayor: Igor Normando (MDB)
  - Vice Mayor: Cássio Andrade (MDB)

Area
  - Municipality: 1,059.4 km^{2} (409.0 sq mi)
- Elevation: 10 m (33 ft)

Population (2025)
  - Municipality: 1,397,315
  - Rank: 11th in Brazil
  - Density: 1,319.0/km^{2} (3,416.1/sq mi)
  - Metro: 2,249,405
- Demonym: Belenense

GDP (PPP, constant 2015 values)
  - Year: 2023
  - Total: $18.4 billion
  - Per capita: $8,000
- Time zone: UTC-03:00 (BRT)
- Postal code: 66000-001 to 66999-999
- Area code: +55 91
- HDI (2010): 0.746 – high
- Website: www.belem.pa.gov.br

Belém (Brazilian Portuguese: [beˈlẽj̃]; Portuguese for 'Bethlehem'; initially called Nossa Senhora de Belém do Grão-Pará, in English Our Lady of Bethlehem of Great Pará), often called Belém of Pará, is the capital and largest city of the state of Pará in the North of Brazil. It is the gateway to the Amazon River with a busy port, airport, and bus/coach station. Belém lies approximately 100 km (62.1 miles) upriver from the Atlantic Ocean, on the Pará River, which is part of the greater Amazon River system, separated from the larger part of the Amazon delta by Ilha de Marajó (Marajo Island). With an estimated population of 1,398,531 people — or 2,491,052, considering its metropolitan area — it is the 12th most populous city in Brazil, as well as the 16th by economic relevance. It is the second largest in the North Region, second only to Manaus, in the state of Amazonas.

Founded in 1616 by the Kingdom of Portugal, Belém was the first European colony on the Amazon but did not become part of Brazil until 1775. The newer part of the city has modern buildings and skyscrapers. The colonial portion retains the charm of tree-filled squares, churches and traditional blue tiles. The city has a rich history and architecture from colonial times. Recently, it witnessed a skyscraper boom.

Belém is also known as the Metropolis of the Brazilian Amazon region or the Cidade das Mangueiras (City of Mango Trees) due to the vast number of those trees found in the city. Brazilians often refer to the city as Belém do Pará ("Belém of Pará") rather than just Belém, a reference to an earlier name for the city, Santa Maria de Belém do Grão Pará ("Saint Mary of Bethlehem of Great Pará"), and also to differentiate it from a number of other towns called Belém in Brazil, as well as the city of Bethlehem in the West Bank of Palestine. It is named after Santa Maria de Belém in Lisbon, also better known by its shortened name, Belém.

Belém is served by Belém International Airport, which connects the city with the rest of Brazil and other cities in South America, North America (United States) and Europe (Lisbon). The city is also home to the Federal University of Pará and the State University of Pará.

== Etymology ==
The name Belém is the Portuguese version of English Bethlehem, ultimately from Hebrew בֵּית לֶחֶם (bēṯ lɛ́ḥɛm, literally “house of bread”). Originally, the city was named "Santa Maria de Belém do Pará" (Saint Mary of Bethlehem in Pará) or "Nossa Senhora de Belém do Grão-Pará (Our Lady of Bethlehem of Grão-Pará). This was eventually abbreviated to "Belém do Pará."

== History ==
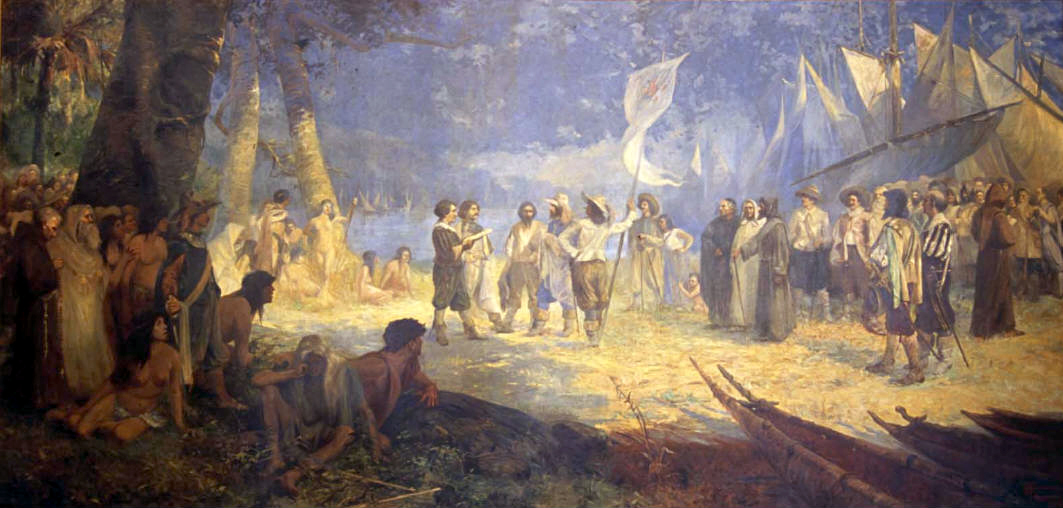
Conquest of the Amazon by Antônio Parreiras, Pará History Museum.

Historical affiliations

Portuguese Empire 1616–1815
United Kingdom of Portugal, Brazil and the Algarves 1815–1823
Empire of Brazil 1823–1889
Republic of Brazil 1889–present

In 1615, Portuguese captain-general Francisco Caldeira Castelo Branco of the captaincy of Bahia commanded a military expedition sent by the Governor General of Brazil to check the trading excursions of foreigners (French, Dutch, English) up the river (Amazon) from the Cabo do Norte in Grão Pará.

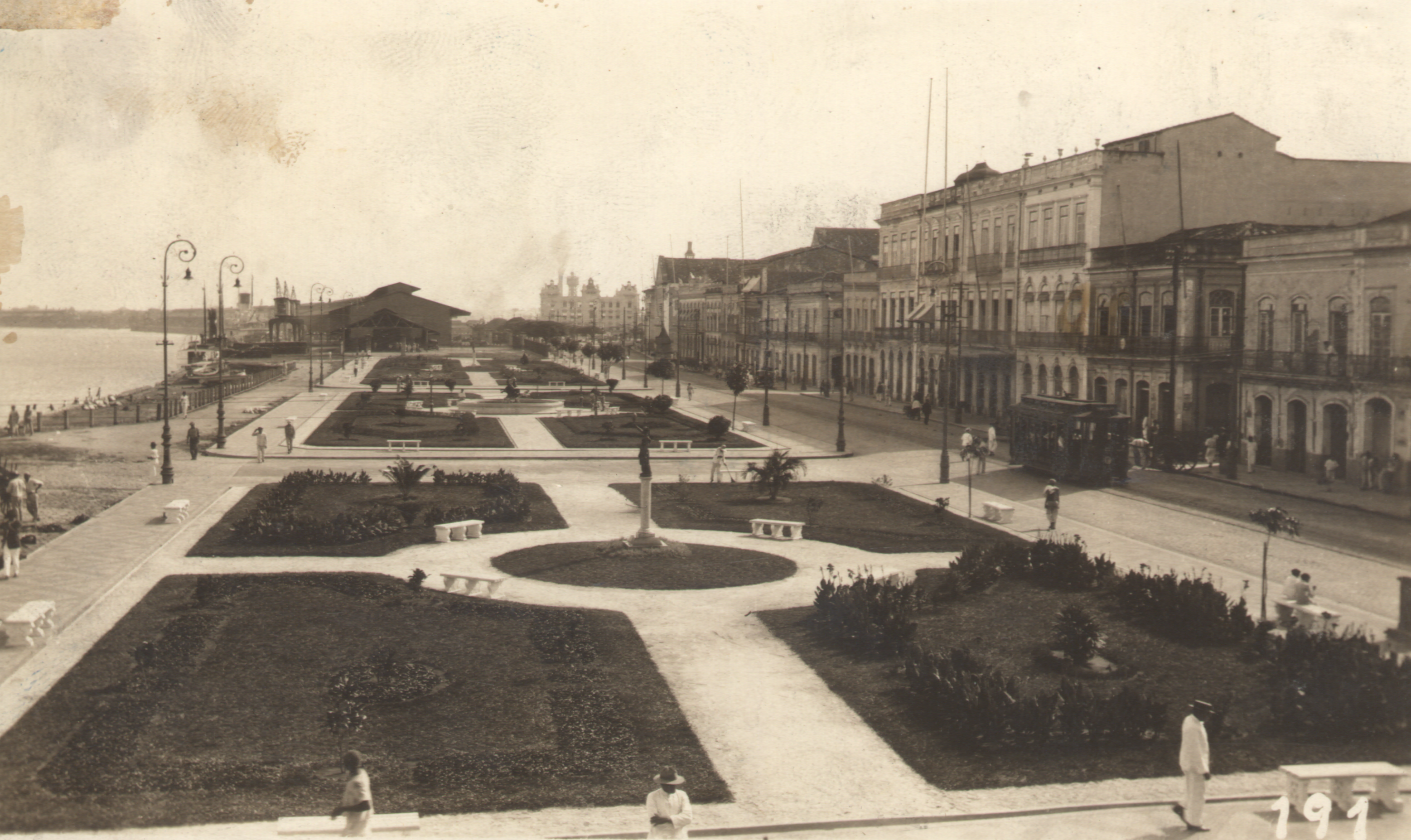
Belém, 1910s. National Archives of Brazil.

On January 12, 1616, he anchored in what is now known as Guajará Bay, formed by the confluence of the Para and Guamá Rivers, called by the Tupinambás, "Guaçu Paraná". Caldeira mistook the bay for the main channel, and thirty leagues (178 km) upstream, he built a wooden fort, covered with straw, which he called "Presépio" (nativity scene), now known as "Forte do Castelo". The colony formed by the fort was given the name Feliz Lusitânia, "Fortunate Lusitania". It was the embryo of the future city of Belém. The fort failed to suppress Dutch and French trading, but did ward off colonization.

Feliz Lusitânia was later called Nossa Senhora de Belém do Grão Pará (Our Lady of Bethlehem of Grao-Para) and Santa Maria de Belém (St. Mary of Bethlehem). Belém was given city status in 1655 and was made capital of the State when Pará state was split off from Maranhão in 1772. The early decades of the 19th century were marked by political instability. Uprisings and internecine strife finally ended in 1836, after considerable loss of life.

Belém, 1975. National Archives of Brazil.

The sugar trade in the Belém region was important up to the end of the 17th century. Thereafter the city's economic importance alternately rose and fell. Cattle ranching supplanted sugar until the 18th century, when cultivation of rice, cotton and coffee became profitable. With the settlement of southern Brazil, where such crops could be produced more efficiently, Belém declined again. The city subsequently became the main exporting centre of the Amazon rubber industry, and by 1866 its position was further enhanced by the opening of the Amazon, Tocantins and Tapajós rivers to navigation. The importance of Belém was then somewhat reduced by the development of the Port of Manaus upriver. The rubber era ended after the boom of 1910–12, but Belém continued to be the main commercial centre of northern Brazil and the entrepôt for the Amazon valley.

== Geography ==
The municipality includes the islands of Mosqueiro, fringed by 14 freshwater beaches, and Caratateua which receive a large number of visitors in summertime. In addition to these and also near Belém, is the island of Tatuoca which is the location of one of the seven geophysical stations in the world, and the only station in Latin America.

=== Climate ===
Belém has a tropical rainforest climate (Köppen: Af) more subject to the Intertropical Convergence Zone than the maritime trade winds, and with no cyclones; that is, a true equatorial climate. In all 12 months of the year, the city on average sees more than 60 mm of rainfall, so the city has no true dry season month. However, Belém features noticeably wetter and drier seasons. The wetter season spans from December through May, while the drier season covers the remaining six months of the year. Like many cities with a tropical rainforest climate, average temperatures vary little throughout the course of the year, generally hovering around 26.5 degrees Celsius. Due to its location in the Amazon, tropical rainforest is the natural vegetation in and around the city.

Climate data for Belém (1991–2020 normals, extremes 1961–present)
Month	Jan	Feb	Mar	Apr	May	Jun	Jul	Aug	Sep	Oct	Nov	Dec	Year
Record high °C (°F)	34.7 (94.5)	34.6 (94.3)	37.3 (99.1)	34.9 (94.8)	34.9 (94.8)	34.7 (94.5)	34.5 (94.1)	37.2 (99.0)	38.1 (100.6)	35.4 (95.7)	36.4 (97.5)	37.3 (99.1)	38.1 (100.6)
Mean daily maximum °C (°F)	31.4 (88.5)	31.0 (87.8)	31.1 (88.0)	31.5 (88.7)	32.2 (90.0)	32.5 (90.5)	32.6 (90.7)	33.0 (91.4)	33.2 (91.8)	33.1 (91.6)	33.1 (91.6)	32.5 (90.5)	32.3 (90.1)
Daily mean °C (°F)	26.3 (79.3)	26.1 (79.0)	26.3 (79.3)	26.5 (79.7)	26.8 (80.2)	26.9 (80.4)	26.8 (80.2)	27.1 (80.8)	27.3 (81.1)	27.3 (81.1)	27.4 (81.3)	27.0 (80.6)	26.8 (80.3)
Mean daily minimum °C (°F)	23.0 (73.4)	23.1 (73.6)	23.3 (73.9)	23.4 (74.1)	23.4 (74.1)	23.1 (73.6)	22.8 (73.0)	22.9 (73.2)	22.9 (73.2)	22.9 (73.2)	23.1 (73.6)	23.1 (73.6)	23.1 (73.5)
Record low °C (°F)	19.4 (66.9)	18.8 (65.8)	19.8 (67.6)	19.2 (66.6)	19.8 (67.6)	19.8 (67.6)	14.0 (57.2)	18.5 (65.3)	18.8 (65.8)	18.9 (66.0)	18.6 (65.5)	19.0 (66.2)	14.0 (57.2)
Average precipitation mm (inches)	393.8 (15.50)	437.8 (17.24)	506.3 (19.93)	465.5 (18.33)	323.6 (12.74)	205.8 (8.10)	156.0 (6.14)	128.7 (5.07)	120.1 (4.73)	135.8 (5.35)	151.4 (5.96)	283.5 (11.16)	3,308.3 (130.25)
Average precipitation days (≥ 1.0 mm)	24.5	24.5	26.0	24.5	22.9	16.8	14.1	11.8	11.8	13.4	12.8	19.4	222.5
Average relative humidity (%)	88.1	89.5	89.7	88.9	86.3	82.8	81.5	80.2	79.3	79.3	79.6	83.7	84.1
Average dew point °C (°F)	24.5 (76.1)	24.5 (76.1)	24.6 (76.3)	24.8 (76.6)	24.9 (76.8)	24.5 (76.1)	24.2 (75.6)	24.2 (75.6)	24.2 (75.6)	24.3 (75.7)	24.4 (75.9)	24.6 (76.3)	24.5 (76.1)
Mean monthly sunshine hours	132.9	104.7	117.2	138.7	187.3	230.3	250.1	264.9	247.1	240.6	205.1	168.1	2,287
Mean daily daylight hours	12.2	12.2	12.1	12.1	12.1	12.0	12.0	12.1	12.1	12.1	12.2	12.2	12.1
Average ultraviolet index	12	12	12	12	12	11	11	12	12	12	12	12	12
Source 1: Instituto Nacional de Meteorologia
Source 2: NOAA Weather atlas(sun-Daylight-UV)

=== Vegetation ===
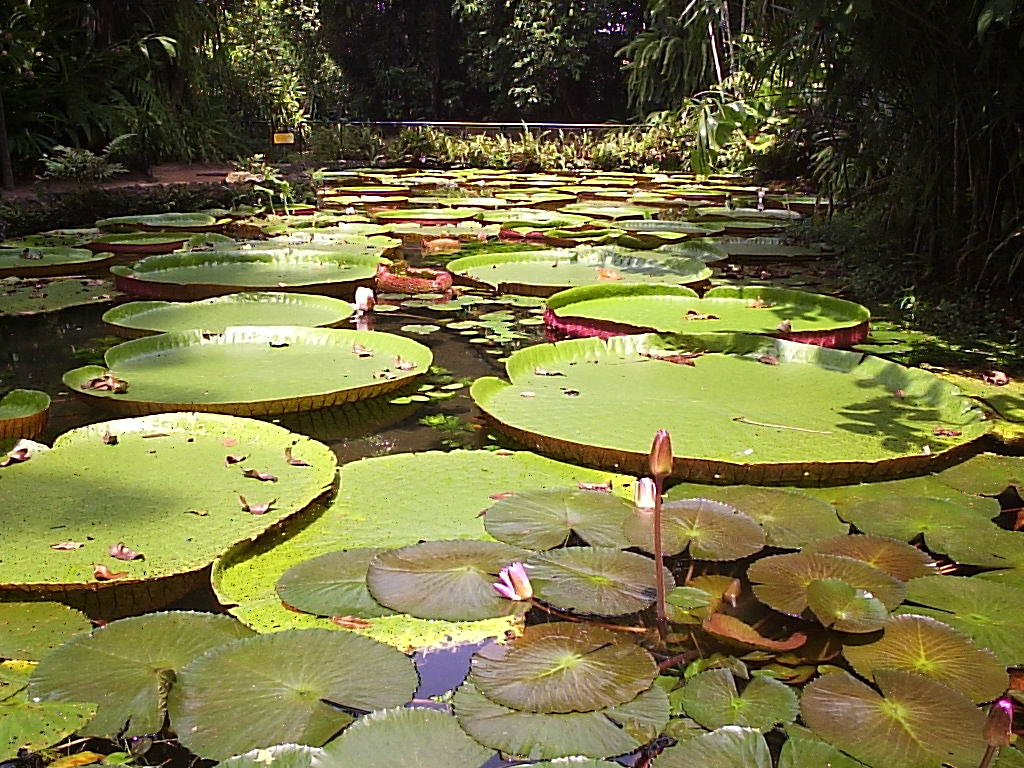
Vitória Régia in Paraense Emílio Goeldi Museum

The Amazon represents more than half the planet's remaining rainforests and comprises the largest and most species-rich tract of tropical rainforest in the world. Wet tropical forests are the most species-rich biome, and tropical forests in the Americas are consistently more species rich than the wet forests in Africa and Asia. As the largest tract of tropical rainforest in the Americas, the Amazonian rainforests have unparalleled biodiversity. More than one-third of all species in the world live in the Amazon Rainforest.

== Economy ==
Many valuable products now exported from the Amazon by way of Belém are aluminium, iron ore, and other metals, nuts (chiefly Brazil nuts), pineapples, cassava, jute, wood veneers, and hardwoods. Japanese immigration after the 1930s was an important factor in developing jute and black pepper, notably at Tomé-Açu, just south of Belém, and near Santarém. Marajó Island, the largest fluvial island in the world, which lies just across the Rio Pará from Belém, has some livestock grazing. Electricity is provided by the massive Tucuruí Dam, some 300 km southwest of the city on the Tocantins River.

== Demographics ==
According to the IBGE of 2018, there were 2,491,052 people residing in the Metropolitan Region of Belém. This region is composed by 7 cities: Belém (1,485.732 people), Ananindeua (525,566 people), Marituba (129,321 people), Benevides (61,689 people), Santa Bárbara do Pará (20,704 people), Santa Izabel do Pará (69,746 people), and Castanhal (198,294 people). In 2012, according to IBGE, the capital city itself had a population density of 1,337.2 inhabitants per square kilometre (3,463/sq mi). The last PNAD (National Research for Sample of Domiciles) census revealed the following numbers: 806,103 Pardo (Multiracial) people (61.8%), 342,476 White (26.3%), 149,395 Black (11.5%), 3,298 Asian people (0.3%) and 2,069 Amerindian people (0.2%).

According to an autosomal DNA genetic study from 2011, the ancestral composition of the population of Belém is: 68.6% European ancestry, followed by 20.9% Amerindian ancestry and 10.6% African ancestry.

== Education ==
Portuguese is the official national language, and thus the primary language taught in schools. But English and Spanish are part of the official high school curriculum.

=== Education institutions ===
- Universidade Federal do Pará (UFPA);
- Universidade do Estado do Pará (UEPA);
- Federal Rural University of Amazonia (UFRA);
- Universidade da Amazônia (UNAMA);
- Centro de Instrução Almirante Brás de Aguiar (CIABA);
- Centro Universitário do Estado do Pará (Cesupa);
- Amazon Valley Academy International School (AVA);
- Escola Superior da Amazônia (UNIESAMAZ);
- Centro Universitário Metropolitano da Amazônia (UNIFAMAZ)
- Instituto Federal de Educação, Ciência e Tecnologia do Pará (IFPA)

== Culture ==
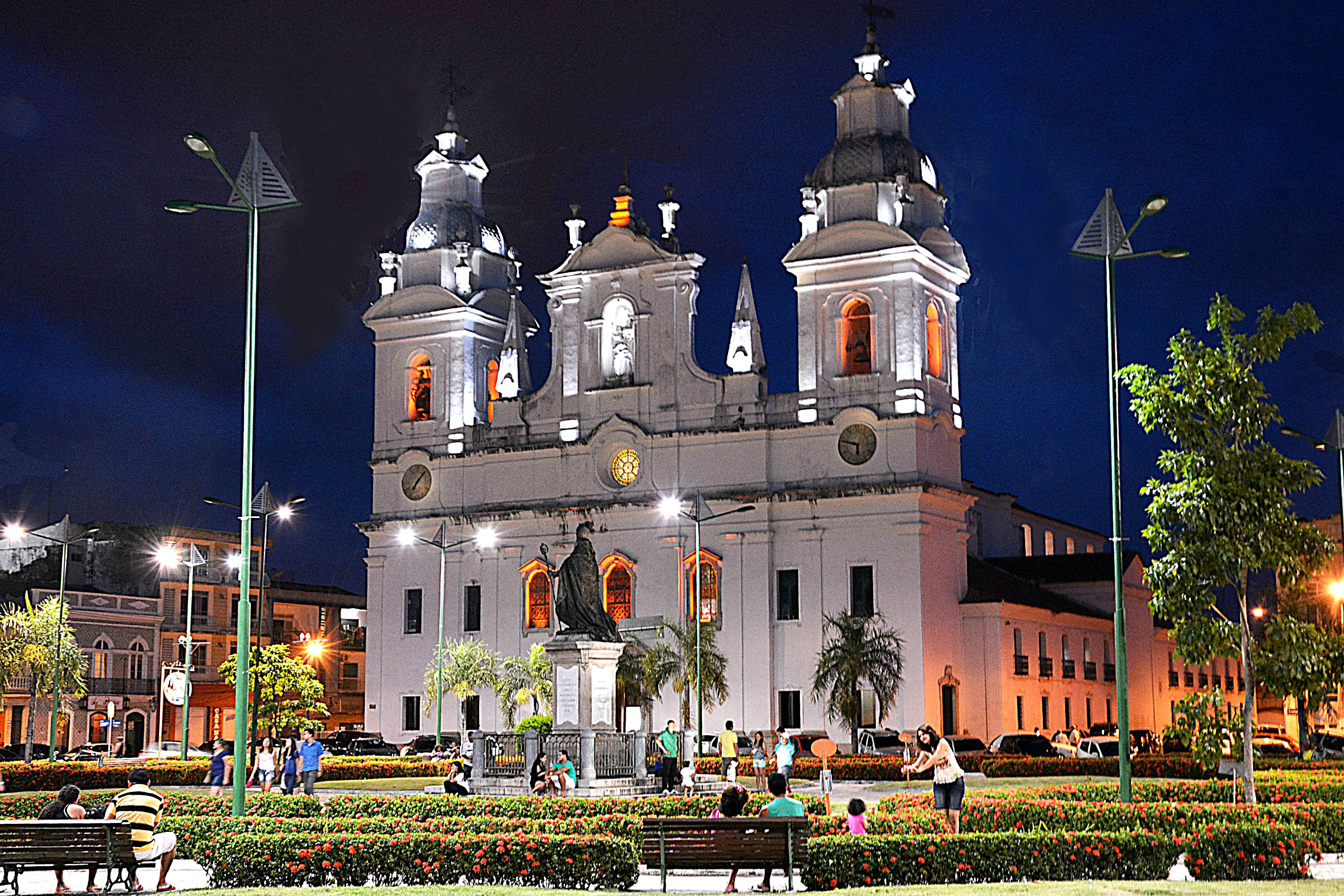
Our Lady of Grace Cathedral, Belém, also known as the Sé Cathedral

=== Círio de Nazaré ===
On the second Sunday in October, Pará celebrates the largest religious event in Brazil: the procession of the Círio of Nazaré. This tradition started when a farmer and lumberman called Plácido José de Souza found an image of the Virgin and Child on the edge of the Murucutu creek, where the Basilica of Our Lady of Nazareth of Exile stands today. He decided to take the image home. However, the image would mysteriously go back to the place where it was initially found every time he took it home. So Plácido decided to build a small chapel on the edge of the creek. This episode was regarded as miraculous throughout the region. It attracted hundreds of believers to see the image and pay homage to it.

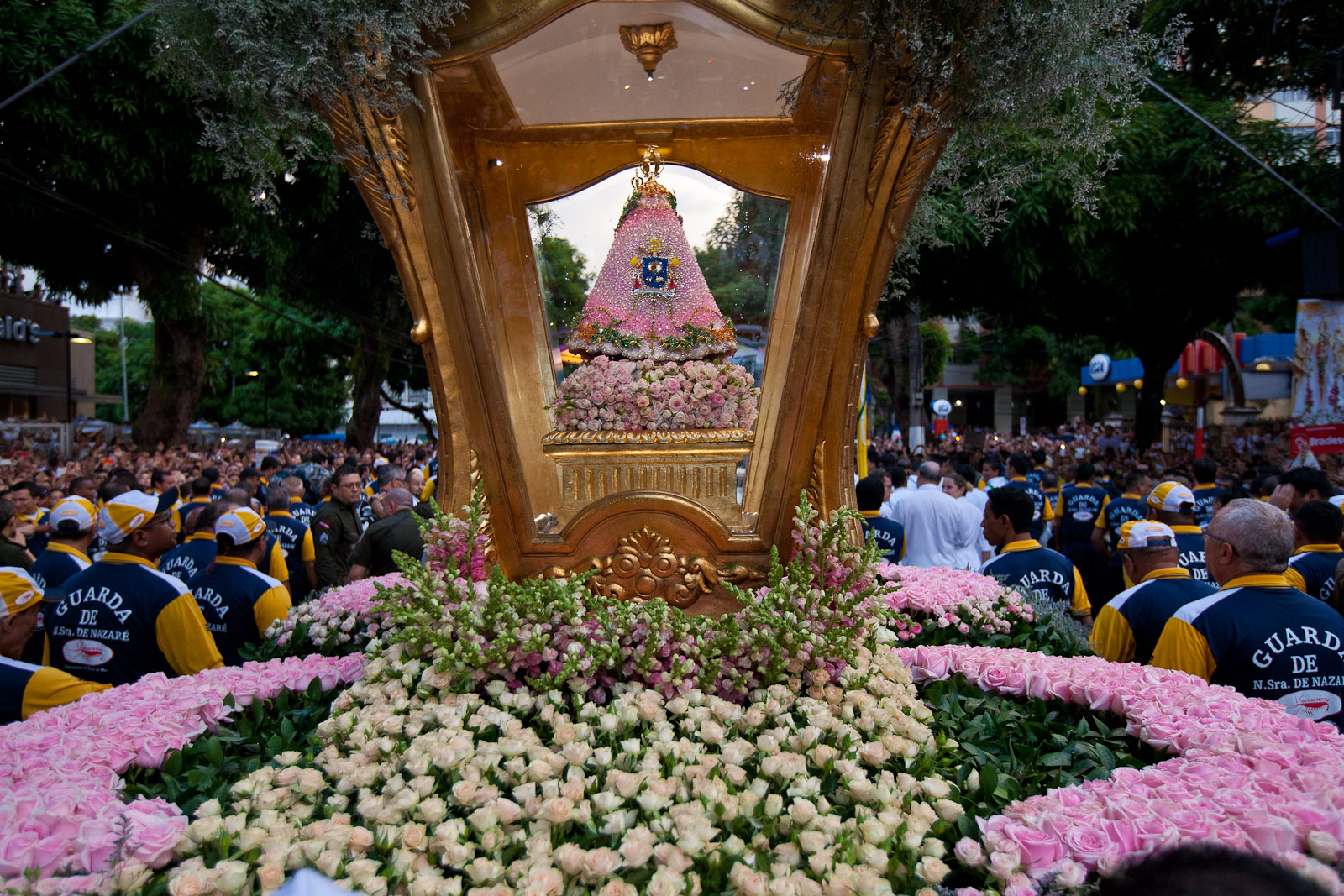
Círio de Nazaré celebration.

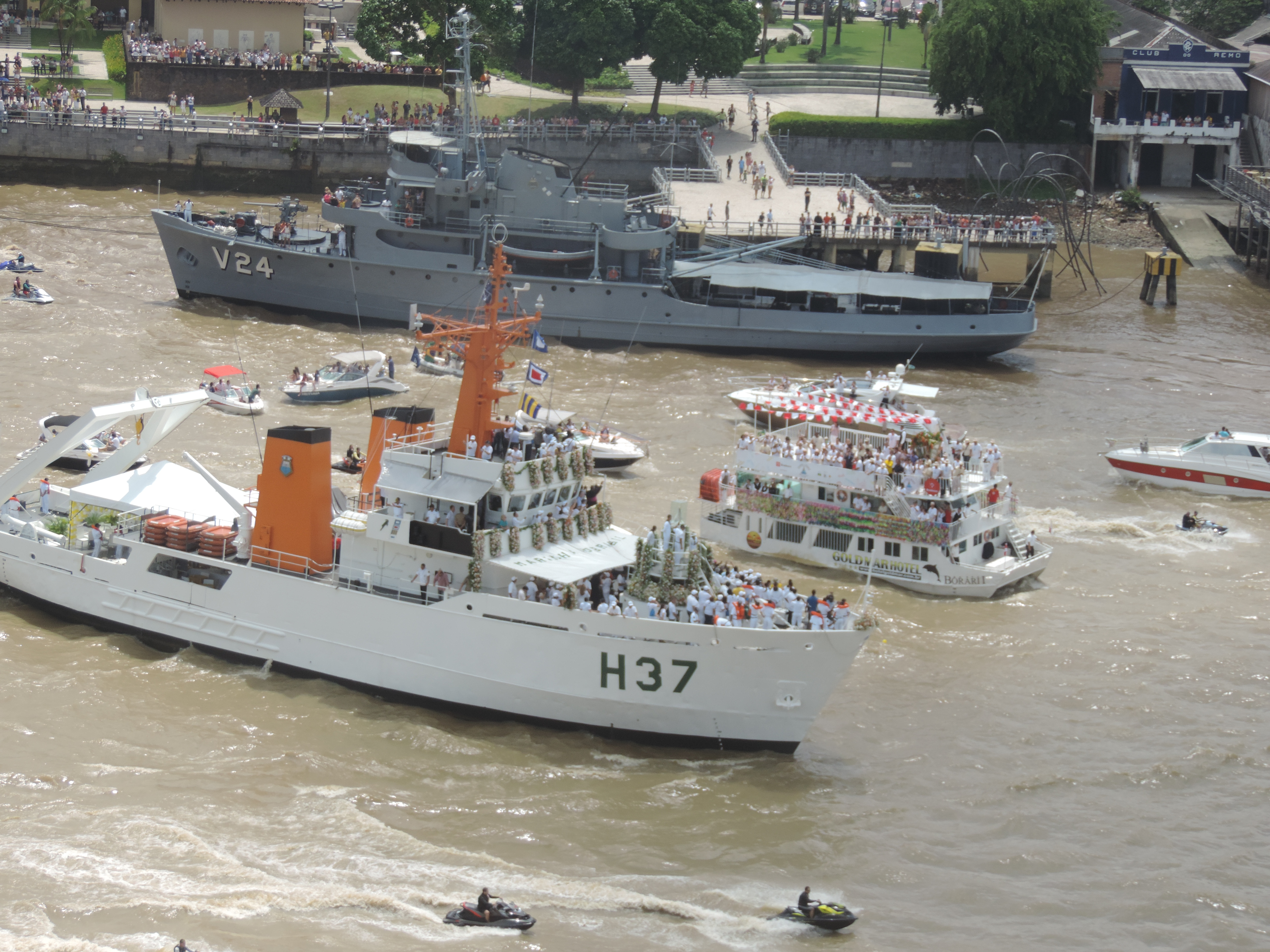
Círio de Nazaré in 2014.

Since then, the Círio has been celebrated as a long procession lasting around five hours, in which thousands of people follow the statue through the streets of Belém. The Círio festival is regarded as the "Christmas of the Amazon" because everyone is involved in the arrangements to receive the saint. In early September, minor celebrations take place as a spiritual preparation for the Círio, with thousands of images scattered all over the capital and neighboring cities.

In time it became necessary to incorporate new elements into the tradition due to the people's desire to honor their patron saint. On the Saturday morning prior to the Círio procession the statue is taken to the square of Ananindeua, a nearby city, to begin a Road Pilgrimage to the Icoaraci pier for a Mass. The river pilgrimage then begins. It was created to honor the "water men" who regard the Virgin of Nazareth as their patron saint. There is a traditional ship contest to award the most originally decorated boat. When the Sacred Image leaves Icoaraci in a Navy Corvette, it is followed by dozens of boats and ships through the waters of Guajará Bay to the pier of Belém, from where it is escorted all the way to the Gentil Bittencourt School. The subsequent candle-lit procession symbolizes the story of the discovery of the Saint and its return to where it was found. The procession follows the Carriage, to which a huge rope is tied, which is carried by the faithful until the procession arrives at the Sé Cathedral.

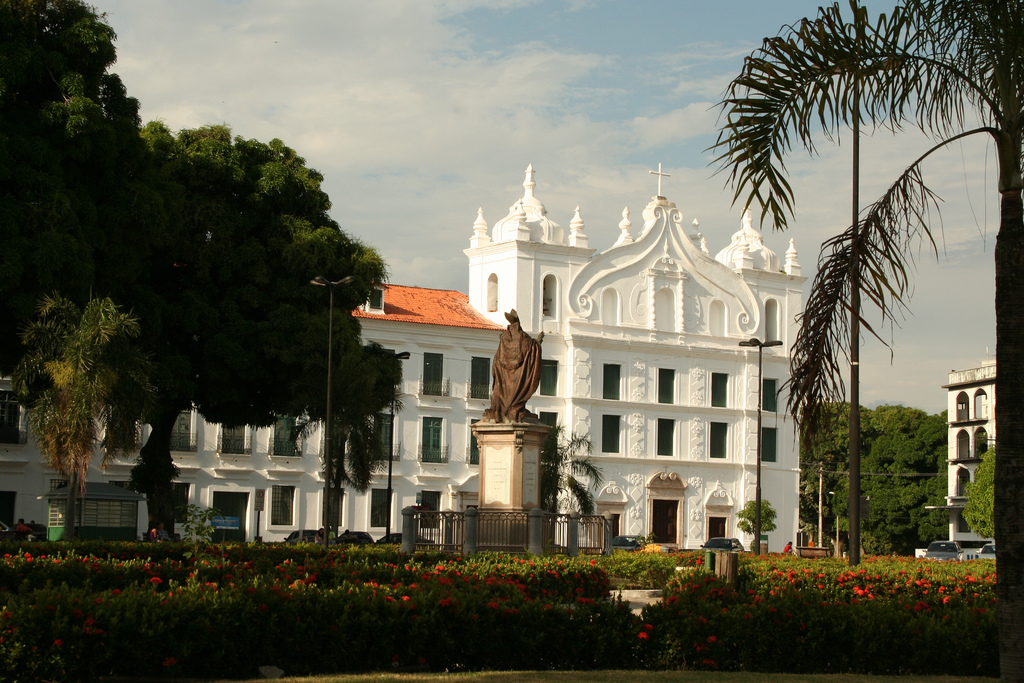
Santo Alexandre Church.

During the procession, there is a fireworks show, sponsored by the Stevedores' Union, marking the passage of the Saint until its arrival at the Cathedral. At daybreak of the next day, the faithful start to gather at the Old City, believing that this will bring them closer to the Virgin. At 7 o'clock, the archbishop conducts the image to the carriage as bells toll and fireworks explode. The main procession then goes through the streets of the city to the Architectonic Centre of Nazareth, known for its Sanctuary Square. As it arrives at the square, the image is removed from the carriage for the celebration of a Mass and then lifted so that everybody will be blessed by the patron saint of Pará.

The festivities last 15 days, with religious celebrations, like the Children's Círio, and its procession, held two Sundays after the Círio. The Re-Círio marks the end of the celebrations, with a shorter course back to the Gentil Bittencourt chapel.

=== Convention and Fair Centre of the Amazon ===
Built in a 23,000-square-metre area, the Hangar Convention and Fair Center of the Amazon has 12 rooms, ticket offices, baggage keeping, press room, and a food court, distributed in two big buildings with a parking lot for 800 vehicles. Genuine Amazonian trees will soon be planted in the outdoor area. With Hangar, Belém joins the market for national conventions that take place in a different city each time, such as the Brazilian Computer Society Congress. National conventions had not been held in the Northern region previously.

Hangar, whose auditorium has room for 2,160 participants, has some of the best technologies available in the world and is the most modern and functional space for events in the country. According to the Brazilian Association of Convention and Fair Centers (ABRACCEF), there are 17,500 events happening on average throughout the 53 main convention and exhibition centres of Brazil. These activities bring together approximately 28 million participants.

=== Architecture ===
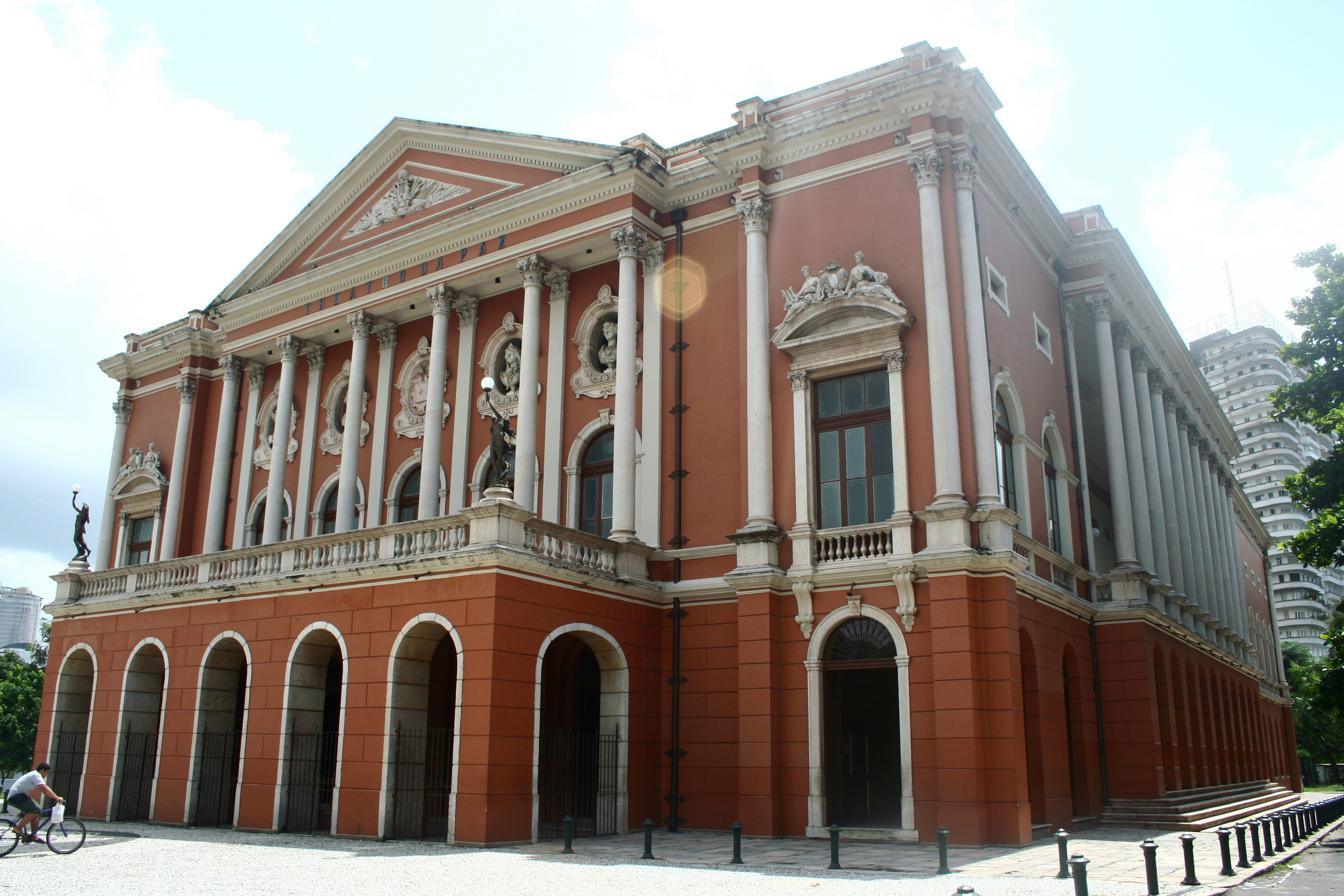
Theatro da Paz.

The colonial architecture Belém reflects the seventeenth-century architecture of Lisbon in Portugal, which served as the inspiration for the main housing projects of the time, with the frequent use of tile-hung façades. The Italian architect and artist Giuseppe Antonio Landi (1713 - 1791) arrived in Pará in 1753 as part of a technical commission, but was invited to stay by Governor Francisco Xavier de Mendonça Furtado, brother of the powerful Sebastião José de Carvalho e Melo, 1st Marquis of Pombal. Landi redesigned the urban plan of the city of Belém, and designing or modifying nearly all of the buildings of the period.

Neoclassical architecture was introduced to Belém in the 19th century, as part of the larger trend in Brazil, and is also present in buildings such as the Theatro da Paz, built in 1874. The Amazoninian rubber cycle brought great wealth to Belém in the late 19th and early 20th century. The intendent Antônio Lemos introduced numerous modernization projects in the city; the wealth élite of Belém built large town mansion, such as the Bibi Costa Mansion, in the eclectic style, many based on French models and building techniques.

On the other hand, many of the city's lower class residents live in substandard housing and urban slums with little access to sewage collection and proper sanitation.

=== Cuisine ===
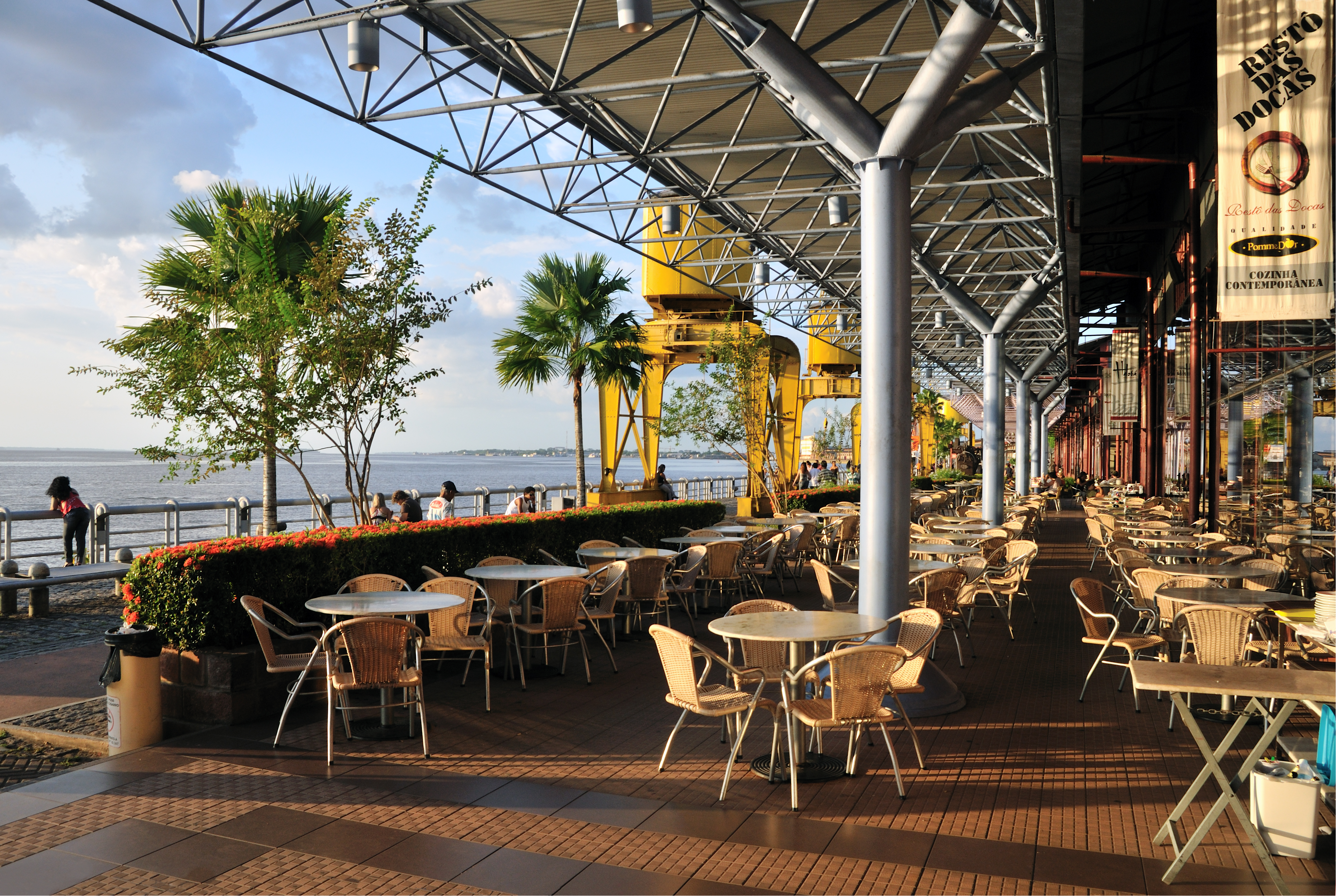
Estação das Docas in Belém

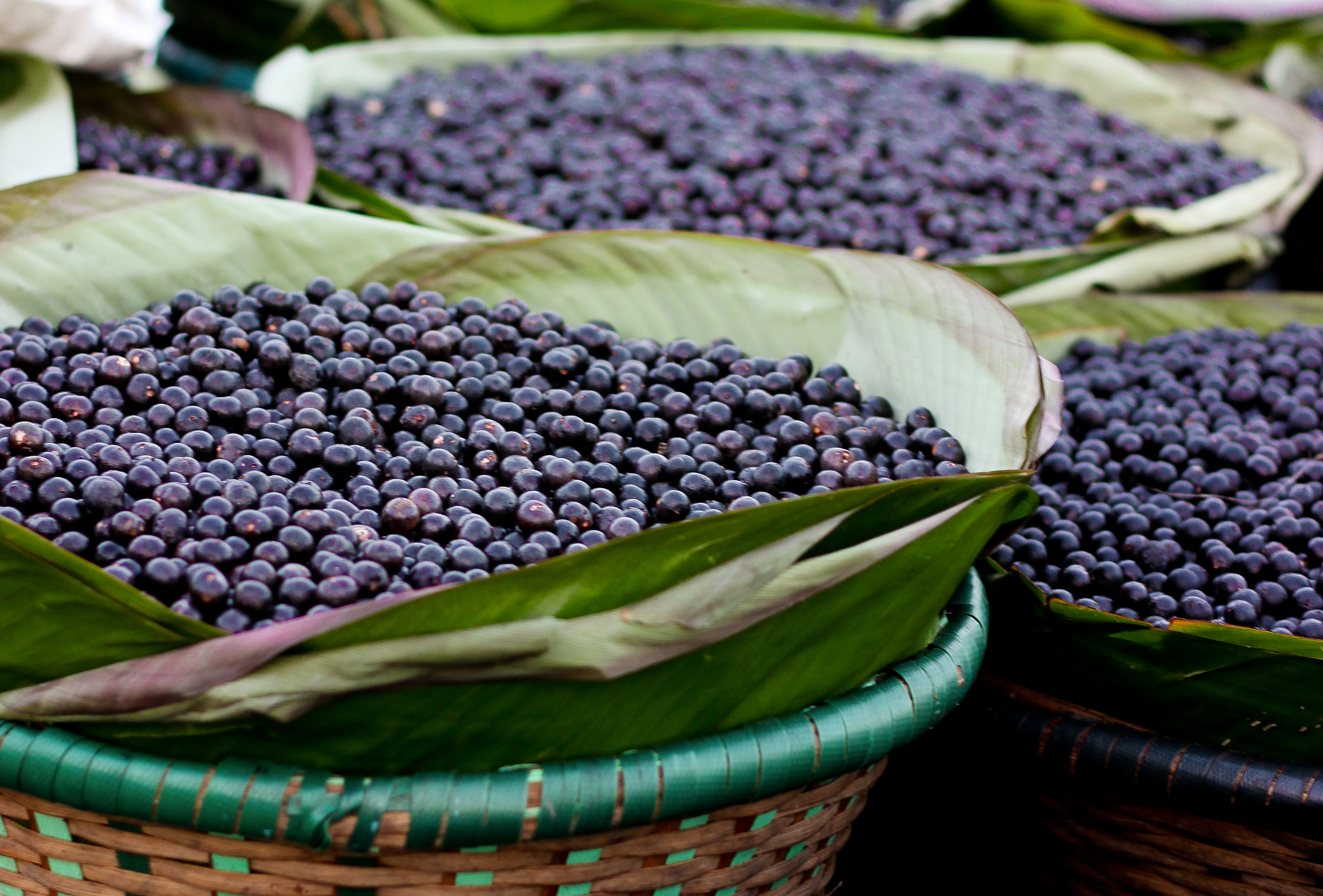
Açaí palm is typical from Belém

The local Amerindian culture makes use of local ingredients to create the colors and flavors of its cuisine. One such ingredient, a fruit named "Cupuaçu", comes from the Cupuaçu tree, found in the Amazonian forest. Cupuaçu is easily identified by its unique smell and sour taste. Its pulp is also extracted to make juices, candies, jellies, liquors, and ice cream. Açaí is a palm tree with a long, thin stem. The palm fruits from this tree are purple in color with an earthy and fruity taste. Long prized by the local population, it recently it has also reached the national menu.

Belém has been part of the UNESCO Creative Cities Network in the category of gastronomy since 2015.

=== World Social Forum ===
The World Social Forum 2009 took place from January 27 to February 1 in Belém.

=== Sports ===
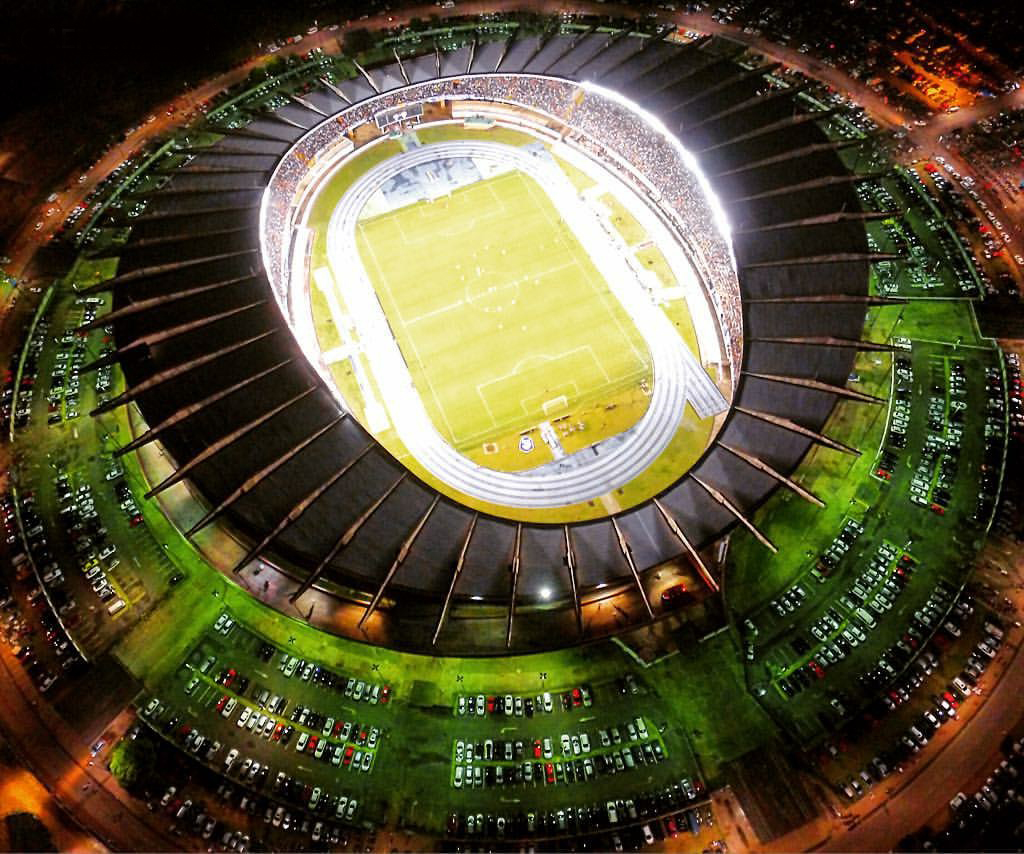
Estádio Olímpico do Pará in Belém.

The three main football teams in Pará are based in Belém: Paysandu, Remo and Tuna Luso. Paysandu based in São Braz, play at the 16,200 capacity Estádio da Curuzú, the oldest stadium of Pará state; Remo, based in Travessa Antônio Baena, play at the 17,250 capacity Baenão; and Tuna Luso-Brasileira based in Souza play at the much smaller 6,500 Estádio Francisco Vasques. The latter stadium is currently the home of Clube Municipal Ananindeua who represent the very large suburb of Ananindeua.

The Estádio Olímpico do Pará is the biggest in the city and hosts 45,000 spectators, the stadium hosts the Grande Premio Brasil de Atletismo, that is part of the IAAF World Challenge as well as Sport Club Belém and the aforementioned teams for large matches.

União Esportiva used to be a relatively successful club based in the city but was disbanded in 1965.

== Tourism ==
Belém has a modern appearance with tree-lined streets, several plazas and public gardens, and many noteworthy buildings. The north's leading educational and cultural centre, it is the seat of a bishopric, and its cathedral (Igreja da Sé, founded in 1917) is one of Brazil's largest. Santo Alexandre, the oldest of Belém's churches, was built in 1616. The Museu (museum) Paraense Emílio Goeldi, the Teatro da Paz (a classical theatre), and the public library and archives are other notable institutions. The Universidade Federal do Pará (1957), a teacher-training school, an agricultural institute, and an institute for research on tropical diseases are also in the city. The Ver-o-Peso (Portuguese: "see the weight") market in the old port centre is a major tourist attraction. The city is also home to a large football stadium, the Estádio Olímpico do Pará.

=== Utinga State Park ===
The municipality of Belém contains 99% of the Utinga State Park, created in 1993 to protect the metropolitan area's water supply. The park provides a space for healthy activities in contact with nature by local people, visitors or tourists. It is just a few kilometers from the city center. There are eight trails, all providing direct contact with various species of flora and fauna. The most popular is the monkey trail, which takes about 40 minutes and goes from Bolonha lake to the visitor center, where other activities are available. Visitors can also learn about the water treatment plant that supplies Belém.

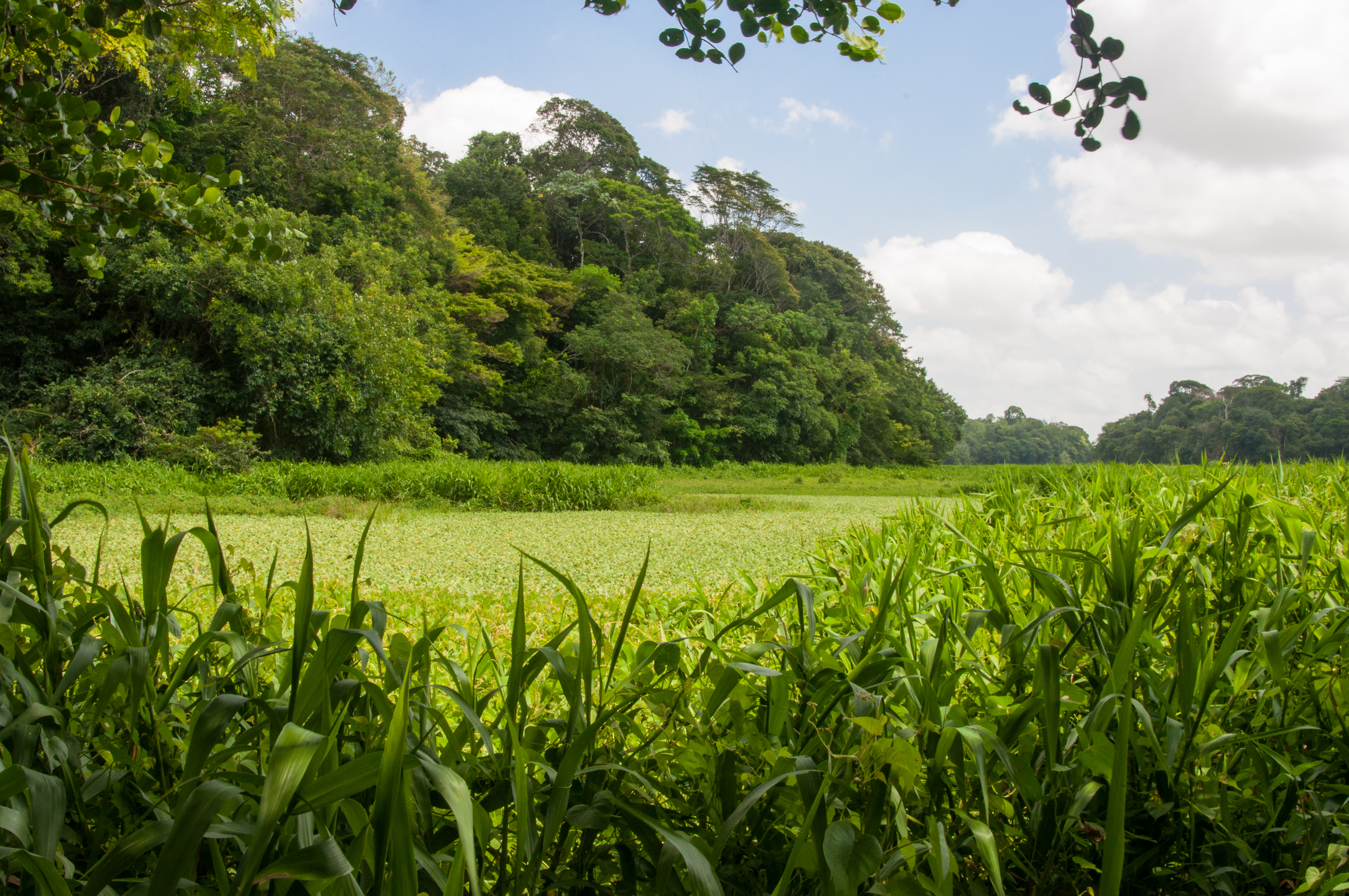
Utinga State Park.

=== Amazon Biopark Zoo ===
Located less than 15 kilometres (9.3 miles) from the center of Belém, in the Tenoné neighborhood, the Bioparque Amazônia Safari – Crocodilo Safari Zoo, is surrounded by forests, rivers and streams. Summary of the Amazon landscape with lush flora and fauna, the zoo has about 14 miles (23 kilometres) of trails in an area composed of four interconnected ecosystems.

The Museum of Paleontology and Malacology had a collection of three thousand pieces of exposed shells and mollusks collected from all continents.

Bioparque The Amazon is a private investment, owner Jorge Arthur Aarão Monteiro, authorized and licensed by IBAMA to function as C class zoo, the only category of Pará There are four different species of alligators in a population of thousands of individuals, highlighting açu for alligator, monkeys, anteaters, and the otters, hyacinth macaw, papagaios, tucannos, pacaranas, harpy eagle, among other animals. Also see the city turistic website here.

=== Rodrigues Alves Wood–Botanical Garden ===
Inspired by the Bois de Boulogne Park in Paris, the Rodrigues Alves Wood is an environmental preservation area in the middle of the city comprising 16 hectares in the Avenida Almirante Barroso. It has 2,500 native species, such as squirrel monkeys, agoutis and macaws, an orchidary, lakes, caverns, waterfalls and a replica mountain.

=== The Estação das Docas Complex ===
The Estação das Docas Complex reopened the windows of Belém to Guajará Bay. The restoration project covers the area of old warehouses of the Pará Docks Company. Constructed from prefabricated metal structures in England and that were built at the beginning of the 20th century in Belém.

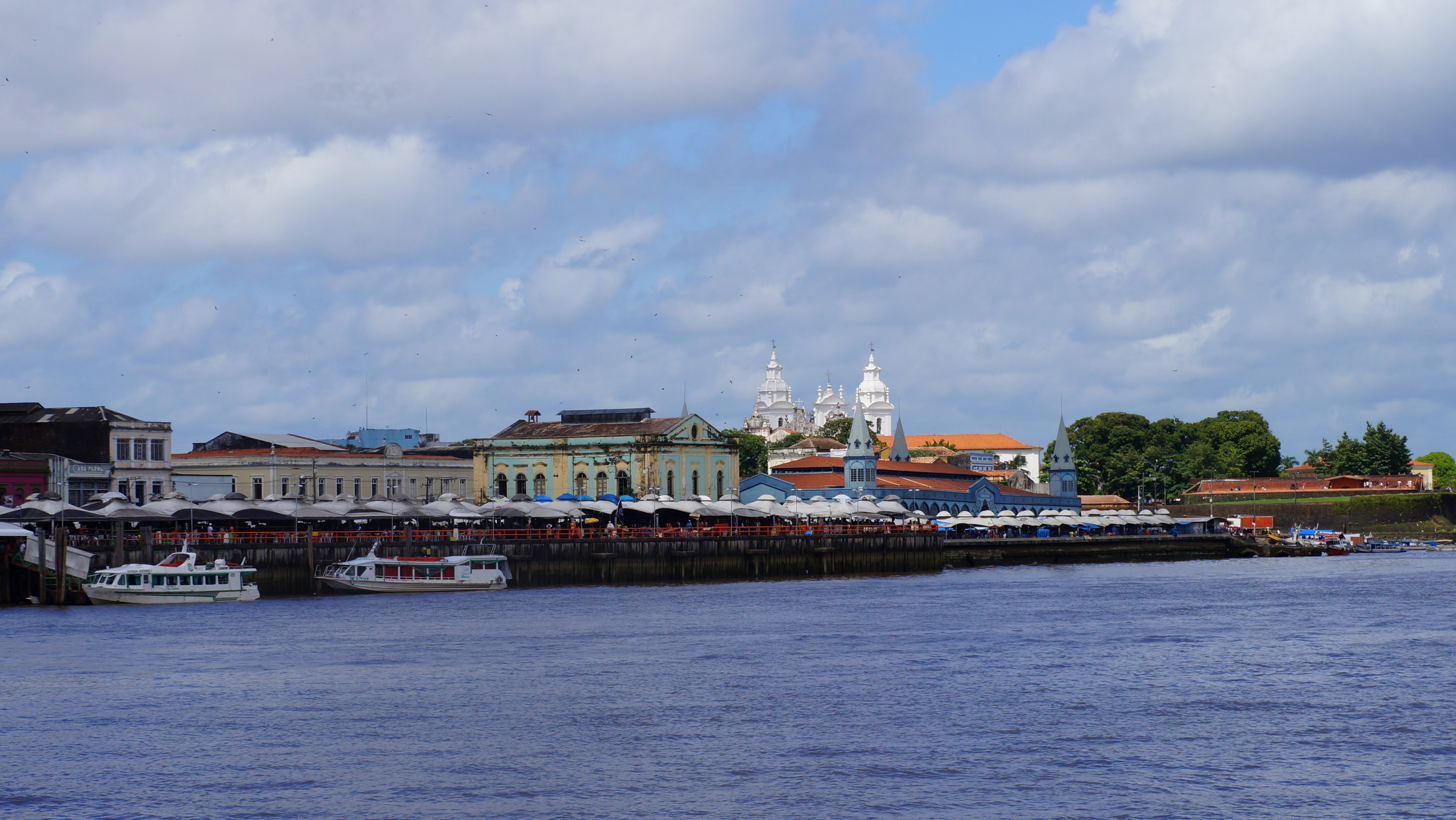
Ver-o-Peso Public Market.

There are eighteen thousand square metres (193,750 square feet) of urbanised area, with coffee bar services, various restaurants, stores, travel agencies, banks, in addition to an auditorium and two memorials: The Porto Memorial and the Fortaleza de São Pedro Nolasco Memorial There is also a fluvial station and extensive external area.

=== Ver-o-Peso Market ===
Created in 1688, as a result of the Portuguese deciding to levy a tax for everything entering and leaving Amazonia. Despite resembling a large retailer, the mixture of colours, fragrances and objects is very interesting as well as folkloric.

Medicinal herbs, various regional fruits, arts and crafts, domestic utilities, meats, fish and seasonings and spices can be found there. The Market brings together two thousand stalls and traders in every part and is located near to the old Mercado de Ferro (Iron market), on the quays.

=== Mosqueiro ===
The river island of Mosqueiro, 67 km (42 mi) north of the heart of the city, attracts beach tourists in the dry season.

== Infrastructure ==
=== Airports ===
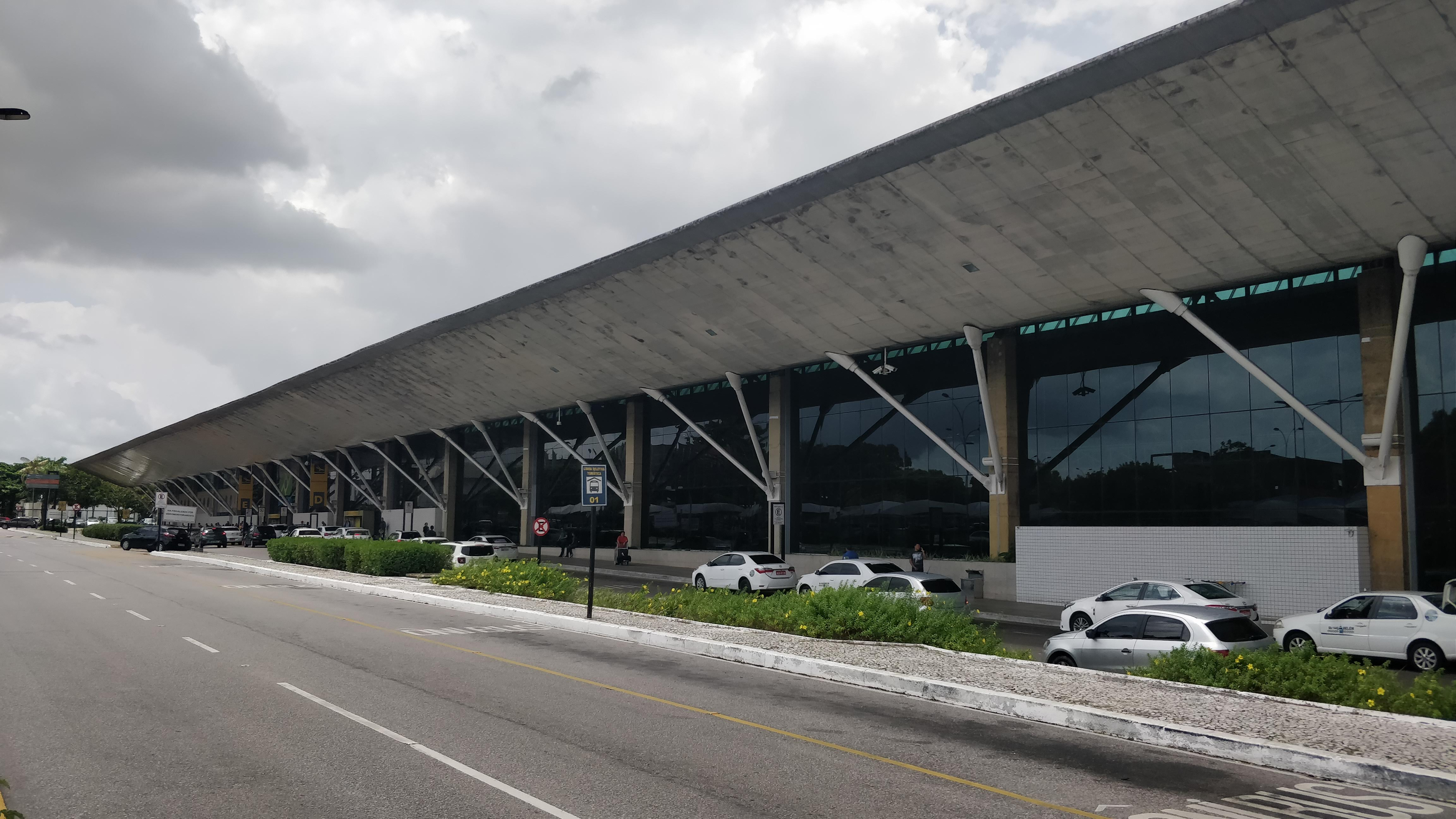
Belém International Airport.

Belém International Airport is the major airport serving the city of Belém. The building design uses plane curves on its roof to permit light to enter its entire large terminal hall.

The architect Sérgio Parada used adopted multiple-use totems integrated with light projectors, a sound system, air conditioning, and public telephones. Currently Belém International Airport serves 2.7 million passengers a year, in a constructed area of 33,255.17 square metres (357,955.67 square feet).

Traditionally called Belém Airport, it is responsible for increasing tourism in the Amazon region, as well as for the outflow of products and attracting new investments. The passenger terminal is fully air conditioned on two levels and has "futuristic" architecture, designed to take advantage of natural lighting. People with special needs have individualized service with own equipment at specific locations to facilitate their access. The terminal's interior is decorated with plants native to the Amazon region and is enclosed by a source able to imitate the sound of the rains that fall every day in the region.

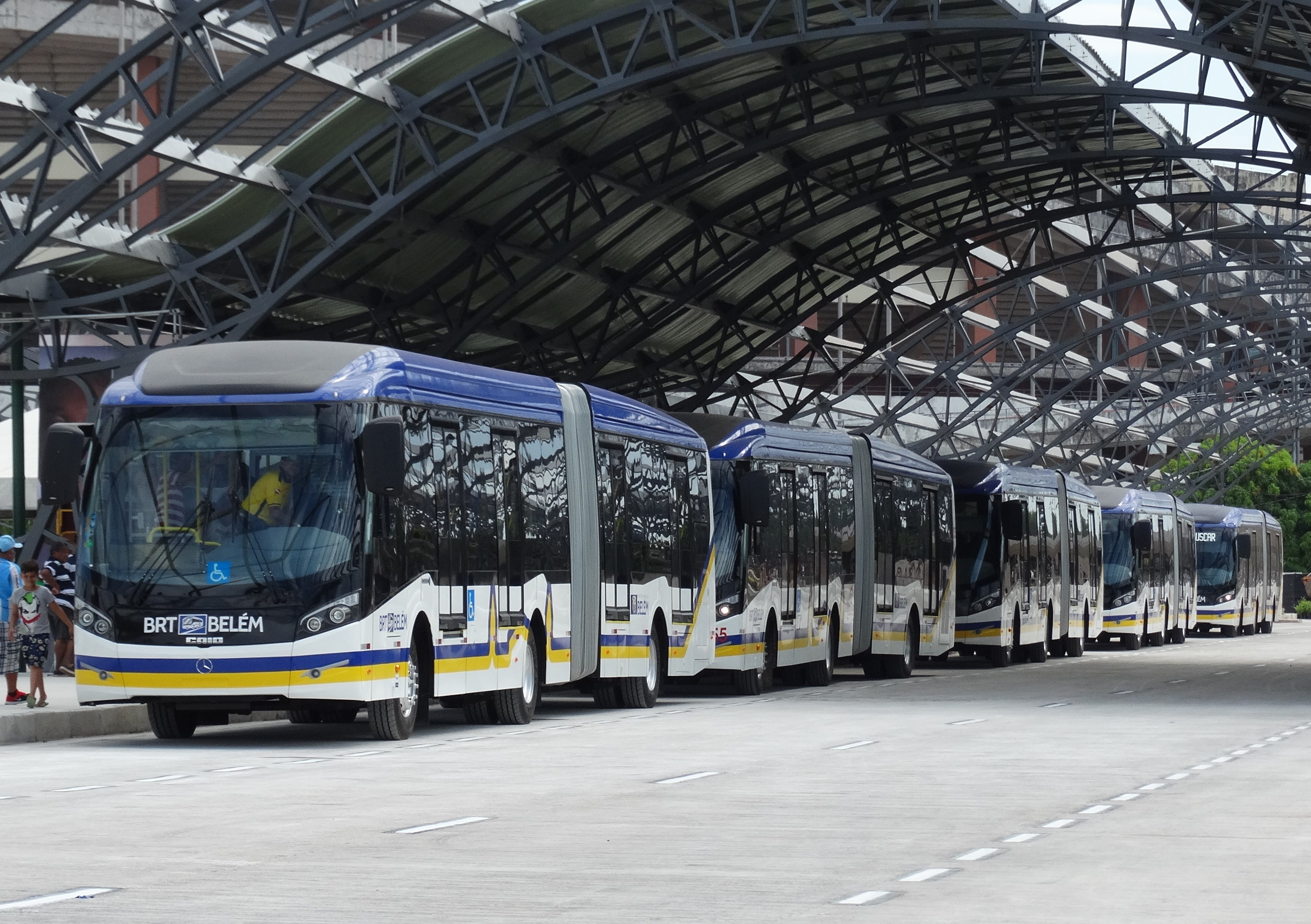
Belém bus system.

There also used to exist a smaller Brig. Protásio de Oliveira Airport (Júlio César), also administrated by Infraero, which was used for general aviation, in January, 1st, 2022 it was taken out of service and the area it occupied is going to be turned into a park, its functions were transferred to the main Belém Airport.

Belém Air Force Base – ALA9, one of their most important bases of the Brazilian Air Force, is located in Belém.

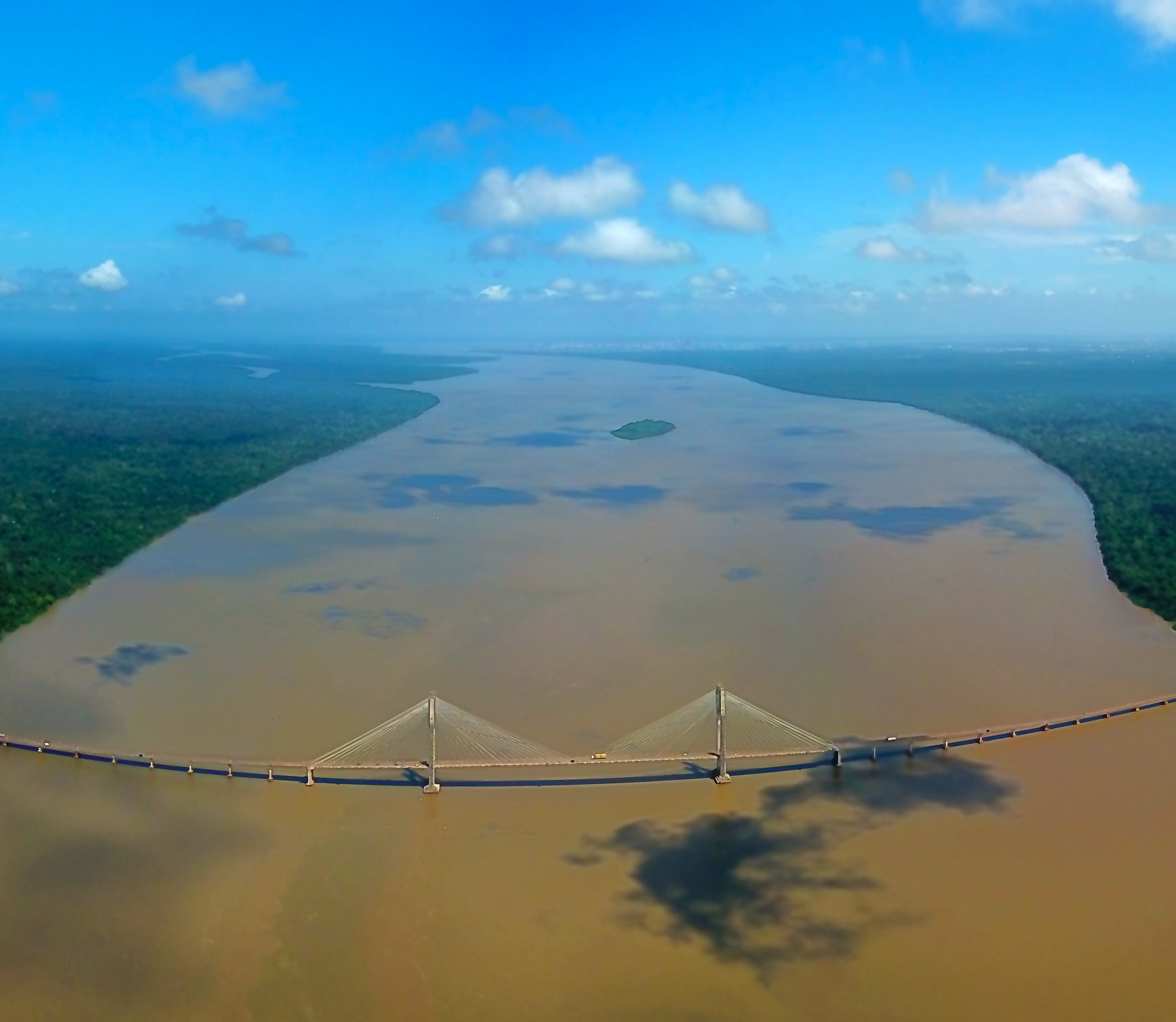
Almir Gabriel bridge over Guamá River and Amazon rainforest.

=== Highways ===
BR-316 is the major access highway for those coming from the Northeastern Brazil. For visitors from the Southern, Southeastern, and Mid-Eastern Regions, the best route is BR-010, which originates in Brasília in the South, and also PA-150, a route that links Belém to Southern Pará.

=== Waterways ===
Belém can be reached by the Tocantins River and Amazonas River and by the Atlantic Ocean.

=== Railways ===
The EF-151 railway, known as "Ferrovia Norte-Sul", literally meaning "North-South Railway", is being extended to run until the city of Barcarena, that is about 111 km away by road. When construction is finished, Barcarena will be linked with important cities, like Imperatriz, Porto Nacional, Anápolis and Panorama.

=== Distances ===
- São Paulo: 2,933 km (1,822 mi)
- Rio de Janeiro: 3,250 km (2,020 mi)
- Brasília: 2,132 km (1,325 mi)
- Manaus: 1,489 km (925 mi)
- Teresina: 923 km (574 mi)
- São Luís: 806 km (501 mi)
- Santarém, Pará: 807 km (501 mi)
- Rio Branco: 2,135 km (1,327 mi)
- Florianópolis: 3,577 km (2,223 mi)
- Cuiabá: 2,970 km (1,850 mi)
- Belo Horizonte: 2,824 km (1,755 mi)

== People ==
- Socrates Brasileiro Sampaio de Souza Vieira de Oliveira - footballer
- Hélio Gracie – martial artist
- Guilherme Paraense — Olympic medalist
- Rogério Ferreira – beach volleyball player, World Champion
- Myke Carvalho — brazilian boxer
- Marcos Gueiros — Brazilian racing driver, three-time champion of the Formula 3
- Beto Gonçalves — footballer
- Dira Paes — actress
- Fafá de Belém — singer
- Yago Pikachu — Brazilian football player
- Giovanni Silva de Oliveira – footballer
- Giuseppe Antonio Landi — architect
- Priscilla Meirelles — Miss Earth 2004
- Ismael Nery — painter
- Charles Guerreiro — Brazilian football player
- João Clemente Baena Soares — diplomat
- José Márcio Ayres — conservationist
- Larissa Pacheco — mixed martial artist
- Lyoto Machida — mixed martial artist
- Paulo Henrique Chagas de Lima — footballer
- Caroline Ribeiro — model
- Priscilla Meirelles — beauty queen
- Paulo Vítor — Brazilian football player
- Carlos Gracie — Brazilian martial artist
- Waldemar Henrique — composer
- Rosamaria Murtinho — actress
- Rossevelt Bala — heavy metal singer
- Victória Pitts – mezzo-soprano

== Government ==
=== Subdivisions ===
Based on Municipal Law nº 8.655 of 30 July 2008, the municipality is divided in 8 Administrative Districts and 71 Neighborhoods:

Administrative Districts	Number of Neighborhoods	Neighborhoods
Center (DABEL)	8	Batista Campos • Campina • Cidade Velha • Marco • Nazaré • Reduto • São Brás • Umarizal
Benguí (DABEN)	8	Benguí • Cabanagem • Coqueiro • Parque Verde • Pratinha • São Clemente • Tapanã • Una
Entroncamento (DAENT)	10	Águas Lindas • Aurá • Castanheira • Curió-Utinga • Guanabara • Mangueirão • Marambaia • Souza • Universitário • Val-de-Cans
Guamá (DAGUA)	6	Canudos • Condor • Cremação • Guamá • Jurunas • Montese (Terra Firme)
Icoaraci (DAICO)	9	Águas Negras • Agulha • Campina de Icoaraci • Cruzeiro • Maracacueira • Paracuri • Parque Guajará • Ponta Grossa • Tenoné
Mosqueiro (DAMOS)	19	Aeroporto • Ariramba • Baía do Sol • Bomfim • Carananduba • Caruará • Chapéu Virado • Farol • Mangueiras • Maracajá • Marahú • Murubira • Natal do Murubira • Paraíso • Porto Arthur • Praia Grande • São Francisco • Sucurijuquara • Vila
Outeiro (DAOUT)	4	Água Boa • Brasília • Itaiteua • São João do Outeiro
Sacramenta (DASAC)	7	Barreiro • Fátima • Maracangalha • Miramar • Pedreira • Sacramenta • Telegráfo
TOTAL	71	

== Consular representations ==
The following countries have consular representations in Belém:

- Japan (Consulate)
- Portugal (Vice-Consulate)
- Suriname (Consulate-General)

== International Relations ==
Belém has the following partnership cities:

- Aveiro, Portugal
- Bethlehem, Palestine
- Campinas, São Paulo, Brazil
- Fort-de-France, Martinique, France
- Goiânia, Goiás, Brazil
- Manaus, Amazonas, Brazil
- Nanyang, Henan, China
- Rio de Janeiro, Rio de Janeiro, Brazil
