= Daniel Duarte Ferreira =

Brazilian politician (born 1982)

Ministry of Regional Development
- In office 31 March 2022 – 30 December 2022
- President: Jair Bolsonaro
- Preceded by: Rogério Simonetti Marinho
- Succeeded by: Waldez Góes

Personal details
- Born: 20 January 1982 (age 44)
- Party: Independent

Daniel de Oliveira Duarte Ferreira (born 20 January 1982) is a Brazilian politician. From March to December 2022, he served as minister of regional development. He previously worked at the Office of the Comptroller General, the Ministry of Cities, the Ministry of Regional Development and the Ministry of Economy.
