= Jader Barbalho Filho =

Brazilian public official (born 1976)

Jader Filho
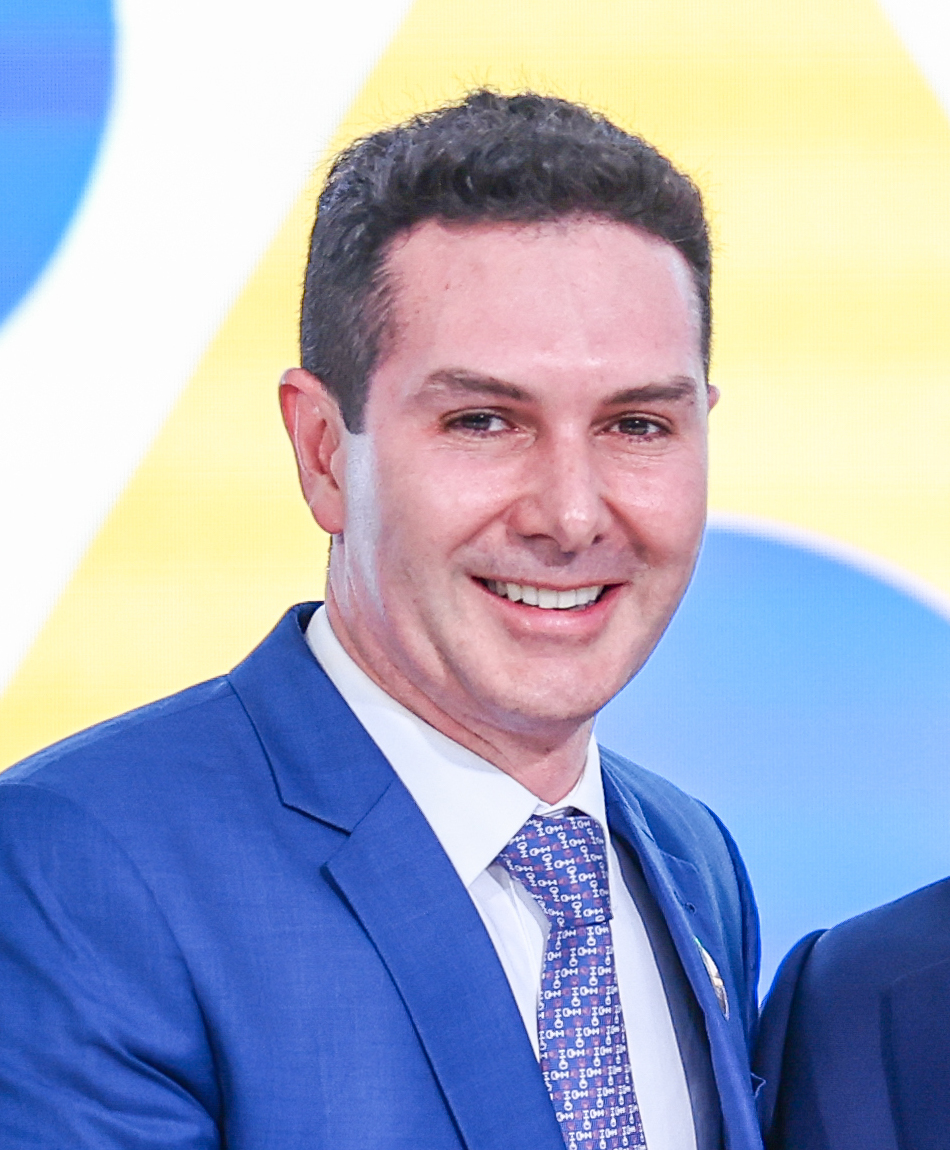
- Filho in 2023

Member-elect of the Chamber of Deputies
- Assuming office 1 February 2027
- Constituency: Pará

Minister of Cities
- In office 1 January 2023 – 2 April 2026
- President: Luiz Inácio Lula da Silva
- Preceded by: Alexandre Baldy
- Succeeded by: Vladimir Lima

Personal details
- Born: Jader Fontenelle Barbalho Filho; 24 June 1976 (age 50) Belém, Pará, Brazil
- Party: MDB
- Spouse: Laice Lazera
- Parent: Jader Barbalho (father)
- Education: Universidade da Amazônia; Fundação Getúlio Vargas

Jader Fontenelle Barbalho Filho (born 24 June 1976) is a Brazilian public official affiliated with the Brazilian Democratic Movement (MDB) party. Since 2023, he has served as Minister of Cities in the cabinet of President Luiz Inácio Lula da Silva.

== Biography ==
Jader Barbalho Filho was born in Belém, Pará. His father, Jader Barbalho, served as Governor of Pará, and his mother, Elcione Zahluth Barbalho, served as a member of the Chamber of Deputies. His brother Helder Barbalho has served as Governor of Pará since 2019.

During the 2022 Brazilian general election, he was considered part of the 'Lulist' wing of the MDB. Following Lula's election, he was chosen for the position of Minister of Cities. He has stated that rebuilding the Minha Casa, Minha Vida public housing program will be a top priority of his leadership.

Political offices
Preceded by Alexandre Baldy	Minister of Cities; 2023–2026	Succeeded by Vladimir Lima
