= Djalma Marinho =

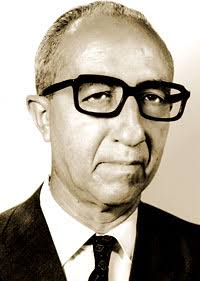

Federal deputy of Rio Grande do Norte
- In office 2 February 1955 – 2 February 1975
- In office 2 February 1979 – 2 February 1981

State deputy of Rio Grande do Norte
- In office 1935–1937
- In office 1947–1951

Personal details
- Born: Djalma Aranha Marinho; 30 June 1908 Nova Cruz, Rio Grande do Norte, Brazil
- Died: 26 December 1981 (aged 73) Natal, Rio Grande do Norte, Brazil
- Party: UDN; ARENA; PDS
- Spouse: Celina Marinho
- Education: Federal University of Pernambuco

Djalma Aranha Marinho (30 June 1908 – 26 December 1981) was a Brazilian lawyer, professor, and politician from the state of Rio Grande do Norte.

== Biography ==
Marinho was born on 30 June 1908 in the city of Nova Cruz, the son of Nestor Marinho and Amélia Aranha Marinho. He began attending the Law School of the Federal University of Pernambuco in 1928, where, while there, was also an adjunct public prosecutor in Ceará-Mirim and Macaíba. He graduated in 1932. He was hired as an employee of the Regional Electoral Court in 1933 and was a judicial consultor for the Fiscal Delegacy of National Treasures in Natal, the procurer of National Finances, and a professor at the Federal University of Rio Grande do Norte. He made his political debut in October 1934 after being elected a state deputy in his home state of Rio Grande do Norte. However, his mandate was revoked when Getúlio Vargas put into effect the Estado Novo regime in 1937. He returned to being a lawyer and worked for Panair do Brasil during World War II.

With the end of the war and the subsequent redemocratization of the country after the fall of Vargas, he became a member of the UDN and was elected as a first substitute for federal deputy in 1945 and later was a state deputy in Rio Grande do Norte in 1947. He was elected again as a substitute for federal deputy in 1950. He went on to take office in the Chamber of Deputies halfway through the term and was elected to his own right to the Chamber of Deputies in 1954 and again in 1958. He was defeated by Aluizio Alves in the gubernatorial election in 1960, but would later be elected to another term as federal deputy in 1962. He would switch affiliations to ARENA when the Military Dictatorship that came to power in 1964 imposed a two-party system. He was reelected in 1966.

== Divergence from the military ==
Marinho was against the request of the military dictatorship to process deputy Márcio Moreira Alves together with the Supreme Federal Court, and as a result renounced his position as president of the Constitution and Justice Committee in December 1968. He declared in a statement, inspired by Pedro Calderón de la Barca: "To the king everything, except for honor". Days after, president Artur da Costa e Silva instituted Institutional Act Number Five and began to close off the regime. He was reelected federal deputy in 1970.

In 1974, he was a candidate for senator for the ARENA in a plebiscite where the victory went to the MDB's candidate Agenor Maria. Upon leaving the Chamber after 5 consecutive mandates, he worked at a law firm led by Dario de Almeida Magalhães and at the Milton Campos Foundation, an extension of ARENA. He was again elected to the Chamber in 1978 and positioned himself in favor of the Amnesty Law. He later became a member of the PDS with party reforms made by the João Figueiredo. His last act as a member of Congress was to run for the Presidency of the Chamber in 1981 in a dissident move supported by members of the opposition, but he was defeated by Nelson Marchezan.

Marinho died on 26 December 181 in Natal due to a pulmonary edema. He was succeeded in parliament by Ulisses Potiguar, but he was removed by a writ of security. He was then succeeded by Ronaldo Dias.

He is the grandfather of the senator from Rio Grande do Norte, former minister of Regional Development, and federal deputy Rogério Marinho.
