= Gustavo Canuto =

Brazilian engineer and politician

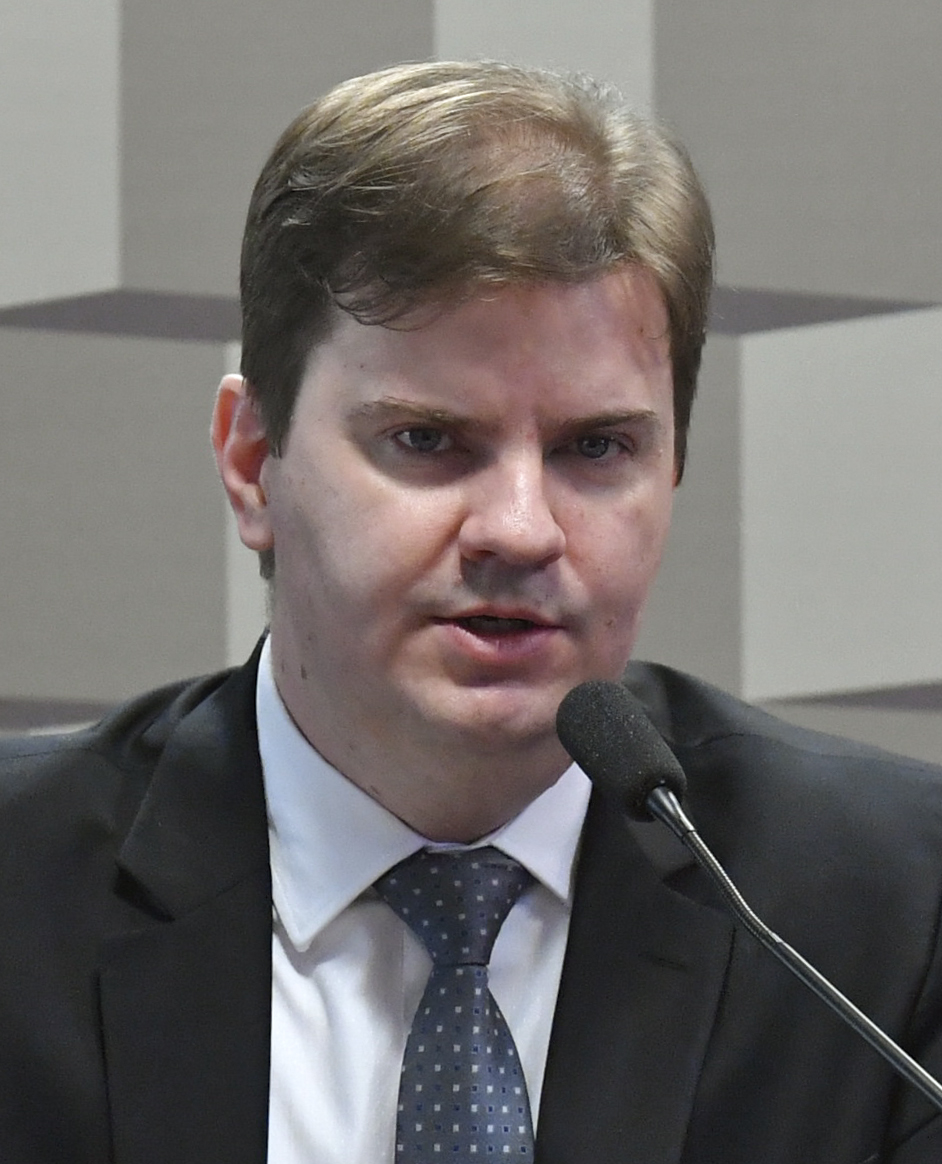

Minister of Regional Development
- In office 1 January 2019 – 6 February 2020
- President: Jair Bolsonaro
- Preceded by: Pádua Andrade (as Minister of National Integration); Alexandre Baldy (as Minister of Cities)
- Succeeded by: Rogério Marinho

Personal details
- Born: Gustavo Henrique Rigodanzo Canuto; 4 July 1978 (age 48) Paranavaí, Paraná, Brazil
- Education: University of Campinas (B.E.); Brasília University Center (LL.B.)

Gustavo Henrique Rigodanzo Canuto (4 July 1978) is a Brazilian engineer and politician, former Minister of Regional Development.

== Biography ==
Born in the state of Paraná, in the city of Paranavaí, son of Sebastião and Anizia Canuto, Canuto is graduated in Computer Engineering at University of Campinas (Unicamp) and in Laws at Brasilia University Center (UniCEUB). The minister is also a government employee as Specialist in Public Politics and Government Management. Between 2015 and 2017, he was Chief of Staff of the Minister of National Integration. Besides that, he also worked at Secretariats of Civil Aviation and General Secretariat of the Presidency, besides Civil Aviation National Agency. Appointed on 28 November 2018 by President-elect Jair Bolsonaro, Gustavo Canuto took office as Minister of Regional Development after the president was sworn in.

== Minister ==
Heading the Ministry of Regional Development, administrating a budget between R$ 6 and 8 billion (between US$ 1,642,126,005.8 and US$ 2,189,501,341.07), Canuto pronounced support the union of the Ministries of National Integration and Cities. The minister, who is not member of any party, had assumed a technical and dialogical position in the leading of questions about the Ministry. Besides being less known, the politician had worked, specially, with Governors and Mayors of the Northeast region, aiming the structural and urban development of the locations, as well as the reduction of regional inequality.

After the first months of Bolsonaro administration, it was announced in the beginning of May the return of the two Ministries fused that originated the Ministry of Regional Development, due to the overload of the demands over the Ministry and the partisan pressure over the government. With that, Gustavo Canuto had his name confirmed for the Ministry of National Integration, facing internal resistance due to the expectative of the Congress about the appointing of a new leader for the Ministry by the Federal Senate. The measure of dismembering was put as an act of building of the parliamentary base of the President, aiming the support for the administrative and social security reforms. After days of negotiation, the current Ministry was kept due to the approval of Provisional Measure 870/2019 by the Senate and the sanction of Bolsonaro.

Political offices
Preceded by Pádua Andrade as Minister of National Integration	Minister of Regional Development; 2019–2020	Succeeded by Rogério Marinho
Preceded by Alexandre Baldy as Minister of Cities	Minister of Regional Development; 2019–2020	Succeeded by Rogério Marinho
