= 2027 President of the Federal Senate of Brazil election =

- 1 February 2027

Needed to Win: 81 eligible voting members in the Federal Senate 41 seats needed for a majority
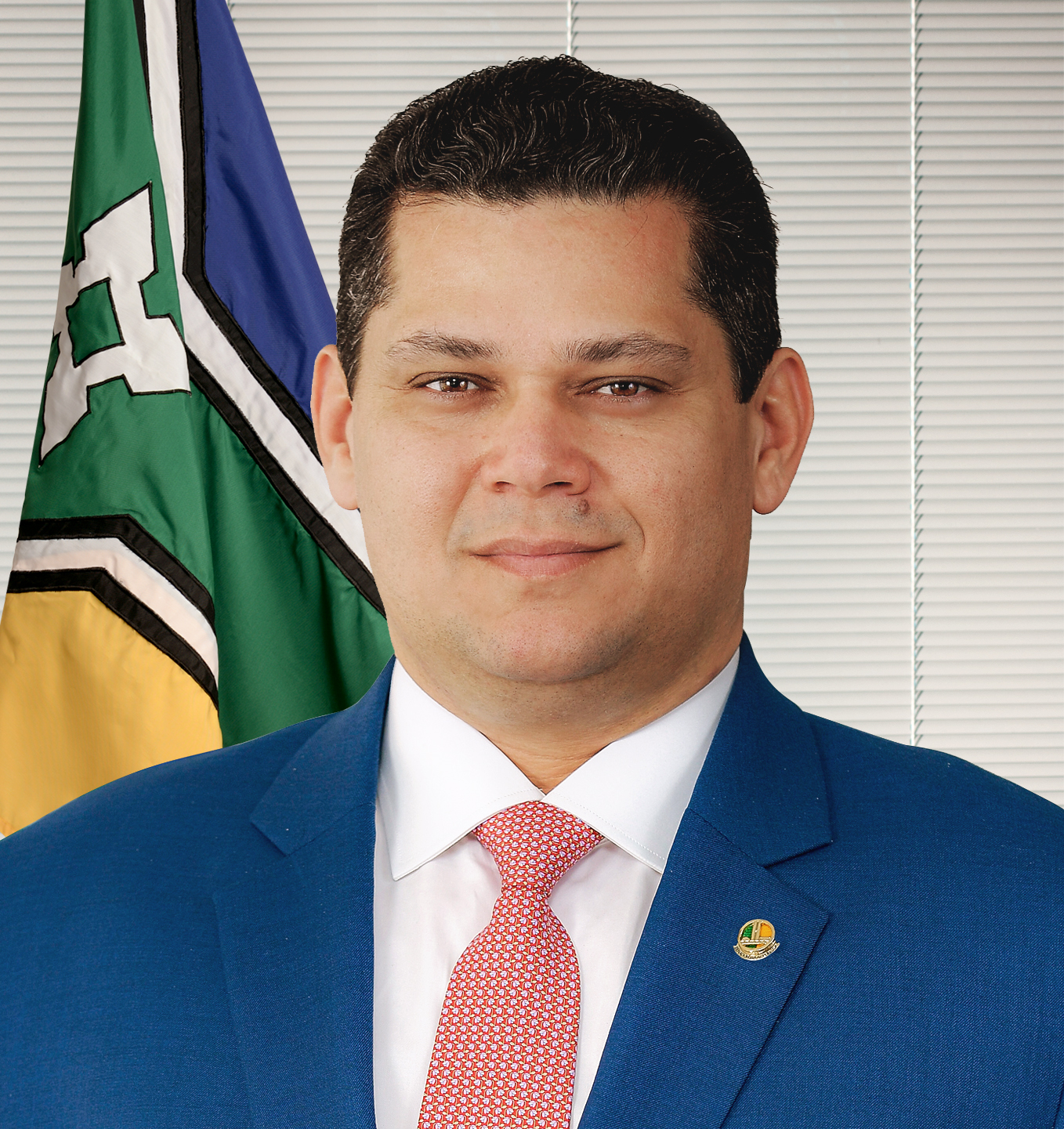

Candidate	Davi Alcolumbre	Rogério Marinho
Party	UNIÃO	PL
Leader's seat	Amapá	Rio Grande do Norte
Incumbent President
Davi Alcolumbre
UNIÃO

The 2027 President of the Federal Senate of Brazil election will take place in February 2027, the opening day of the 1st Session of the 58th Legislature of the National Congress. It will result in the election of the President of the Federal Senate, two vice presidents, the positions of 1st, 2nd, 3rd and 4th secretaries and their respective replacements. They will hold a biennial term (2027–2029), and will not be allowed to be re-elected for the subsequent term (2029–2031), since it falls within the same Legislature.

The incumbent president, Davi Alcolumbre, is eligible to run for re-election, since the election will take place at the beginning of a new Legislature. The election will be carried out by secret ballot and paper ballot, requiring a simple majority and presence of the majority of the seating senators.

== Candidates ==
=== Confirmed candidates ===
- Davi Alcolumbre (UNIÃO-AP), Senator for Amapá (2015–present); President of the Senate (2019–2021; 2025–present).
- Rogério Marinho (PL-RN), Senator for Rio Grande do Norte (2023–present); Minister of Regional Development (2020–2022).

=== Potential candidates ===
- Tereza Cristina (PP-MS), Senator for Mato Grosso do Sul (2023–present); Minister of Agriculture (2019–2022).
- Arthur Lira (PP-AL), Senator-elect for Alagoas (takes office in 2027); Federal Deputy for Alagoas (2011–present); President of the Chamber of Deputies (2021–2025).
