= Rogério Simonetti Marinho =

Brazilian economist and politician

Rogério Marinho
- Official portrait

Senator for Rio Grande do Norte
- Incumbent
- Assumed office 1 February 2023
- Preceded by: Theodorico Netto

Minister of Regional Development
- In office 11 February 2020 – 31 March 2022
- President: Jair Bolsonaro
- Preceded by: Gustavo Canuto
- Succeeded by: Daniel de Oliveira

Special Secretary of Social Security and Labour
- In office 1 January 2019 – 6 February 2020
- President: Jair Bolsonaro
- Minister: Paulo Guedes
- Preceded by: Marcelo Caetano
- Succeeded by: Bruno Bianco

Federal Deputy
- In office 1 February 2015 – 1 February 2023
- Constituency: Rio Grande do Norte
- In office 1 February 2007 – 5 November 2012
- Constituency: Rio Grande do Norte

State Secretary of Economic Development of Rio Grande do Norte
- In office 13 December 2012 – 10 January 2014
- Governor: Rosalba Ciarlini

Councillor
- In office 1 January 2005 – 31 January 2007
- Constituency: Natal
- In office March 2001 – March 2003
- Constituency: Natal

Personal details
- Born: Rogério Simonetti Marinho; 26 November 1963 (age 62) Natal, Rio Grande do Norte, Brazil
- Party: PL (2022–present)
- Other political affiliations: PSB (1993–2009); PSDB (2009–20)
- Education: Marist High School of Natal
- Alma mater: Potiguar University (BEc)
- Profession: Economist

Rogério Simonetti Marinho (born 26 November 1963) is a Brazilian economist and politician, member of the Liberal Party (PL). He's currently a senator representing Rio Grande do Norte since 2023. He was a Federal Deputy until 1 February 2019, representing the state of Rio Grande do Norte, and was the President of Honor of the Brazilian Social Democracy Party (PSDB) in his state. He is the grandson of former federal deputy Djalma Marinho.

Marinho was also the State Secretary of Economic Development of Rio Grande do Norte during the government of Rosalba Ciarlini and was the Minister of Regional Development from 2020 to 2022 during Jair Bolsonaro's government.

Political offices
Preceded by Marcelo Caetano	Special Secretary of Social Security and Labour; 2019–2020	Succeeded by Bruno Bianco
Preceded by Gustavo Canuto	Minister of Regional Development; 2020–2022	Succeeded by Daniel de Oliveira
