= Mário Negromonte Jr. =

Brazilian politician (born 1980)

Mário Negromonte Júnior
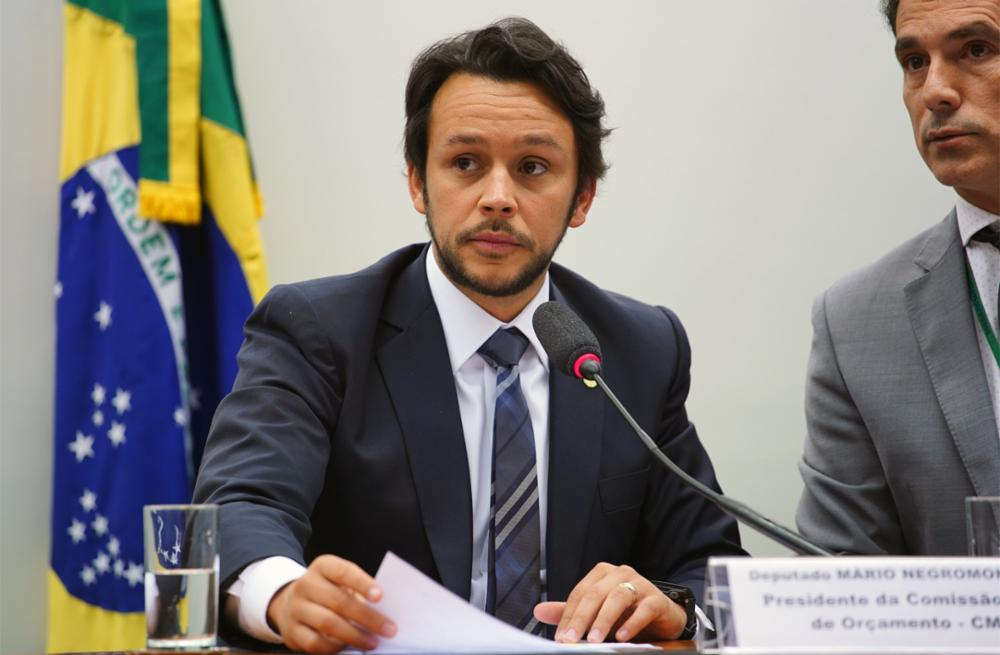

Member of the Chamber of Deputies
- Incumbent
- Assumed office 1 February 2015
- Constituency: Bahia

Member of the Legislative Assembly of Bahia
- In office 1 February 2011 – 1 February 2015
- Constituency: At-large

Personal details
- Born: Mário Sílvio Mendes Negromonte Júnior; 31 August 1980 (age 46) Paulo Afonso, Bahia, Brazil
- Party: PSB (2026–present)
- Other political affiliations: PP (2003–2026)
- Parent: Mário Negromonte (father)
- Education: Jorge Amado University Center (LLB)
- Profession: Lawyer

Mário Sílvio Mendes Negromonte Júnior (born 31 August 1980) is a Brazilian politician and lawyer. He has spent his political career representing Bahia, having served in the state legislature from 2011 to 2015 and as a federal deputy representative since 2015.

== Personal life ==
Negromonte Jr. comes from a political family, he is the son of Mário Negromonte and Vilma Negromonte. His father, mother, and uncle are also politicians. He is an alumnus of the Jorge Amado University. He is married to Camila Vasquez. Prior to becoming a politician Negromonte Jr. was a lawyer.

== Political career ==
Negromonte Jr. abstained from the impeachment motion of then-president Dilma Rousseff. Arruda voted in favor of tax reform spending and the 2017 Brazilian labor reform, and voted against opening a corruption investigation against Rousseff's successor Michel Temer.
