= Helder Barbalho =

Brazilian politician

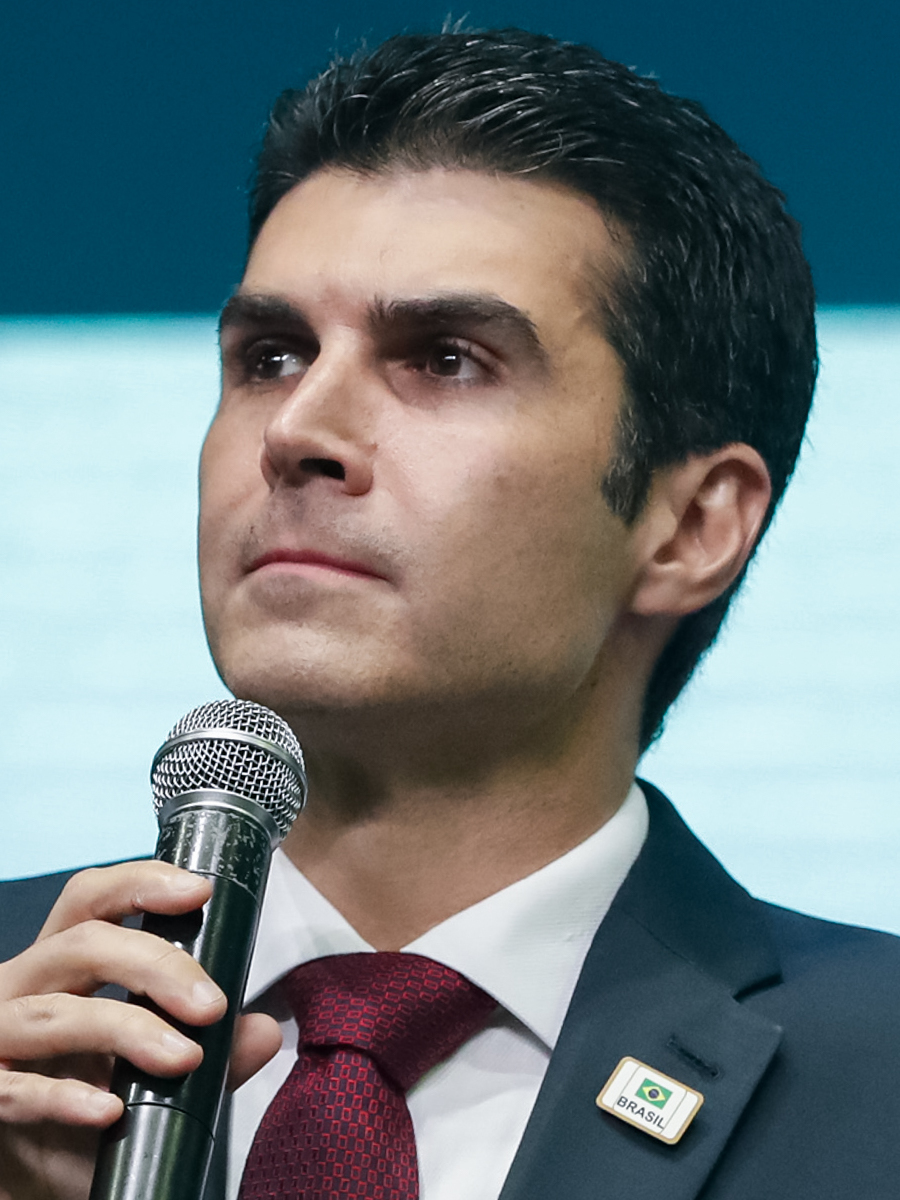
- Helder in 2019

Senator-elect for Pará
- Assuming office 1 February 2027

Governor of Pará
- In office 1 January 2019 – 2 April 2026
- Vice Governor: Lúcio Vale
- Preceded by: Simão Jatene
- Succeeded by: Hana Ghassan

Minister of National Integration
- In office 12 May 2016 – 6 April 2018
- President: Michel Temer
- Preceded by: Josélio de Andrade Moura (acting)
- Succeeded by: Pádua Andrade

Secretary of Ports
- In office 2 October 2015 – 20 April 2016
- President: Dilma Rousseff
- Preceded by: Edson Coelho Araújo
- Succeeded by: Maurício Muniz Barreto de Carvalho

Minister of Fishing and Aquaculture
- In office 1 January 2015 – 2 October 2015
- President: Dilma Rousseff
- Preceded by: Eduardo Lopes
- Succeeded by: None (extinct)^{[E]}

Mayor of Ananindeua
- In office 1 January 2005 – 1 January 2013
- Preceded by: Manoel Carlos Antunes
- Succeeded by: Manuel Carlos Antunes

Personal details
- Born: Helder Zahluth Barbalho; 18 May 1979 (age 47) Belém, Pará, Brazil
- Party: MDB (1997–present)
- Parent(s): Jader Barbalho; Elcione Zahluth Barbalho
- Relatives: Jader Filho (brother); José Priante (cousin); Igor Normando (cousin); Lúcio Mauro (great-uncle)
- Occupation: Administrator

Helder Zahluth Barbalho (born 18 May 1979) is a Brazilian administrator, politician, the current governor of the state of Pará, former Chief Minister of National Secretariat of Ports and Minister of Fishing and Aquaculture during the government of president Dilma Rousseff, and former Minister of National Integration, appointed by president Michel Temer.

He is the son of former governor of Pará and current senator Jader Barbalho and federal congresswoman Elcione Zahluth Barbalho, has a bachelor's degree in administration by Universidade da Amazônia (UNAMA) and an executive MBA in public administration from Fundação Getulio Vargas

As the son of Pará's former governor Jader Barbalho, Helder Barbalho started his political career while young, at the age of 18 he joined the Brazilian Democratic Movement, in 2000, he became the most voted city councilman in the city of Ananindeua, and in 2002 was elected State deputy in the legislature of Pará, once again as the most voted candidate in the state's history, he left the position in 2004 to become mayor of the city of Ananindeua in 2005, a position that he held until 2012.

In 2014, Barbalho participated in the elections to become governor of Pará but was defeated by then governor Simão Jatene, he joined the federal government as Minister of Fishing and Aquaculture in 2015 and later became Minister of National Integration until he left in 2018 to dispute and win the 2018 elections for the state of Pará becoming governor from 2019 on.

== Biography ==
Helder Barbalho was born in Belém, capital of the brazilian state of Pará, son of politicians Jader Barbalho and Elcione Zahluth Barbalho, both members of the Brazilian Democratic Movement. He went through basic education in Colégio Pequeno Princípe, Escola Tenente Rego Barros, both in Belém, and on Colégio Marista, in Brasília. Back on his hometown, Helder went through high school on Escola Tenente Rego Barros and Colégio Moderno.

In 2002, he attained a bachelor's degree in administration by Universidade da Amazônia (UNAMA) and right after, obtained the executive MBA in public administration by Fundação Getulio Vargas (FGV) on the city of São Paulo.

He is married with Daniela Lima Barbalho, who is also the mother of his three children: Helder Filho, Thor, and Heva.

He is cited in 2017 among the beneficiaries of bribes paid by the multinational JBS S.A..

== Notes ==
- E. Charge fused with Ministry of Agriculture, Livestock and Supply.

Political offices
Preceded by Manoel Carlos Antunes	Mayor of Ananindeua; 2005–2013	Succeeded by Manoel Carlos Antunes
Preceded by Eduardo Lopes	Minister of Fishing and Aquaculture; 2015	Office extinct
Preceded by Edson Coelho Araújo	Secretary of Ports; 2015–2016	Succeeded by Maurício Muniz Barreto de Carvalho
Preceded by Josélio de Andrade Moura (acting)	Minister of National Integration; 2016–2018	Succeeded by Pádua Andrade
Preceded by Simão Jatene	Governor of Pará; 2019–2026	Succeeded by Hana Ghassan
