= Edson Coelho Araújo =

Brazilian politician (born 1949)

Edinho Araújo
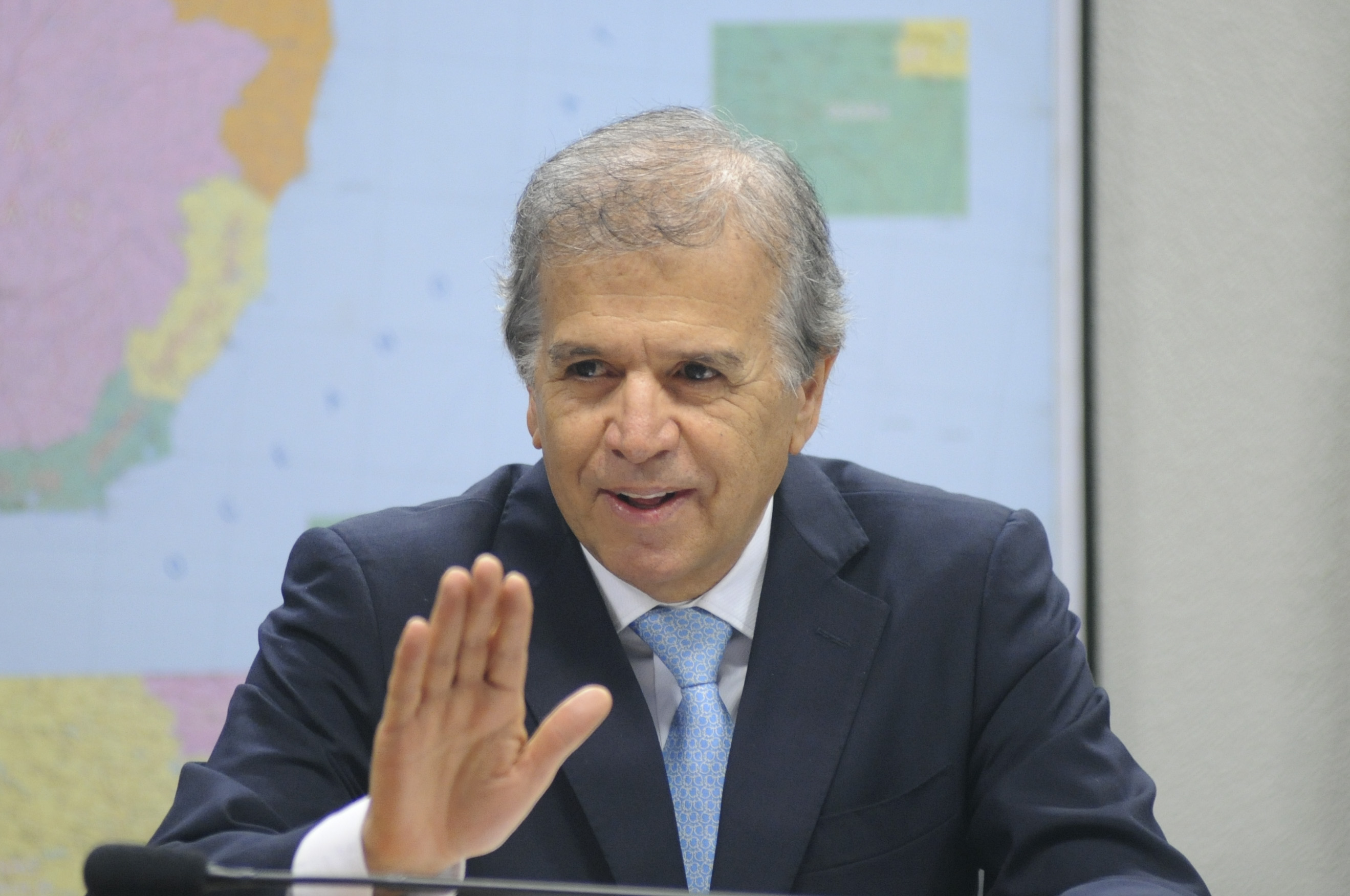
- Araújo in July 2015

Mayor of São José do Rio Preto
- In office 1 January 2017 – 31 December 2024
- Preceded by: Valdomiro Lopes
- Succeeded by: Fábio Candido

Federal Deputy for São Paulo
- In office 1 February 1995 – 1 January 2001
- In office 1 February 2011 – 31 January 2017

Secretary of the Ports of Brazil
- In office 1 January 2015 – 2 October 2015
- President: Dilma Rousseff
- Preceded by: César Borges
- Succeeded by: Helder Barbalho

State Deputy for São Paulo
- In office 15 March 1983 – 1 February 1995

Mayor of Santa Fé do Sul
- In office 31 January 1977 – 31 January 1983
- Preceded by: Jerônimo de Paula
- Succeeded by: Antonio Carlos de Camargo

Personal details
- Born: Edson Coelho Araújo; 30 July 1949 (age 77) Santa Fé do Sul, SP, Brazil
- Party: PRD

Edson Coelho Araújo (born 30 July 1949), better known as Edinho Araújo, is a Brazilian politician. He is the current mayor of São José do Rio Preto, and in the past represented São Paulo as a federal deputy representative from 1995 to 2001 and from 2011 to 2017, as well as serving in the state legislature and as mayor of Santa Fé do Sul from 1977 to 1983.

== Personal life ==
Araújo is the son of Emídio Antonio Araújo and Gabriela Coelho Araújo. He is married to Maria Elza and has three children: Thaysa, Bethina and Edson, and a granddaughter, Maria Victoria. Araújo is a practicing Presbyterian.

== Political career ==
Araújo voted in favor of the impeachment motion of then-president Dilma Rousseff. Araújo voted in favor of tax reform spending and the 2017 Brazilian labor reform.

In May 2018 Araújo was ordered to testify by the courts as part of operation Skala conducted into reports of corruption between politicians of the MDB party, including then-president Michel Temer, and the company Rodrimar. Police eventually said they found no evidence of direct involvement by the politicians, although their public perception was hurt.

In 2018 Araújo ran for and was elected to the position of mayor for the municipality of São José do Rio Preto.
