= Waldez Góes =

Brazilian politician (born 1961)

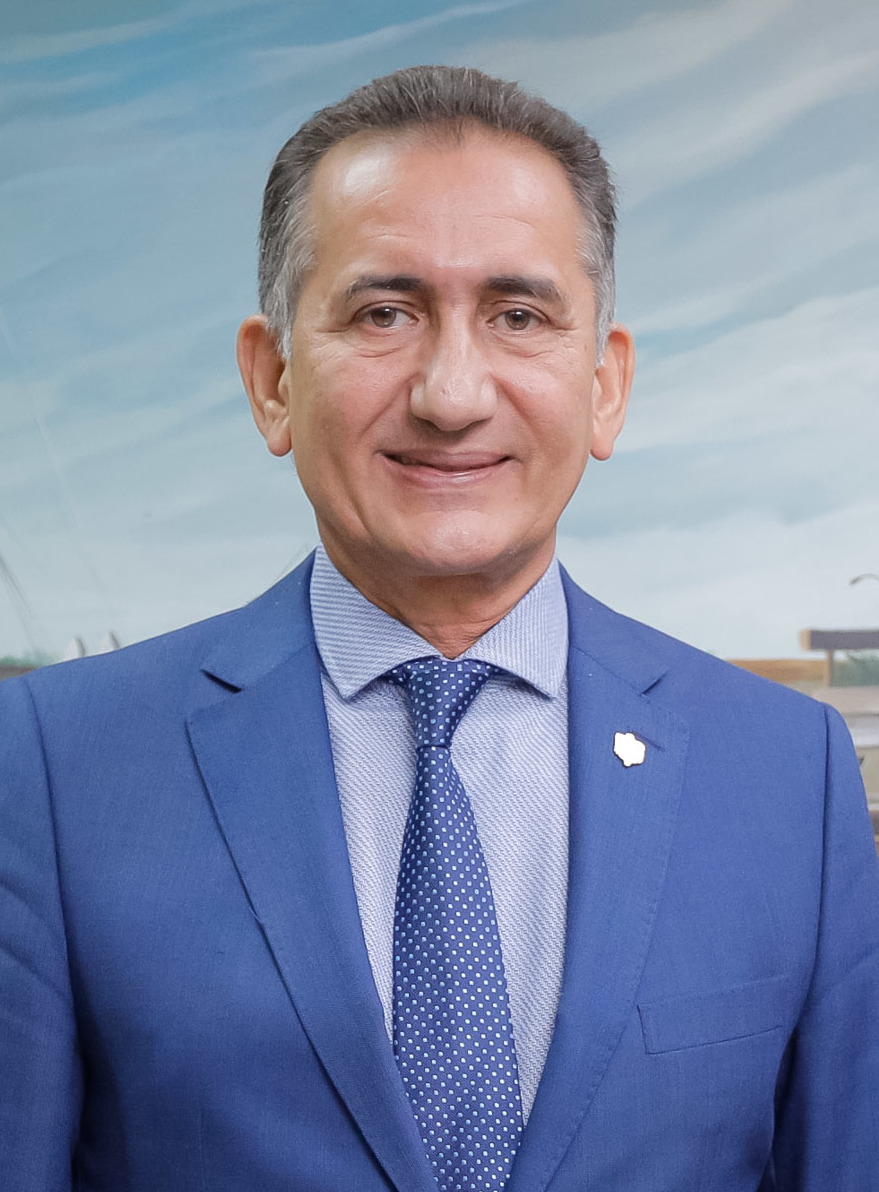
- Góes in 2019

Minister of Integration and Regional Development
- Incumbent
- Assumed office 1 January 2023
- President: Luiz Inácio Lula da Silva
- Preceded by: Daniel Duarte Ferreira

Governor of Amapá
- In office 1 January 2015 – 1 January 2023
- In office 1 January 2003 – 31 March 2010

Personal details
- Born: Antônio Waldez Góes da Silva; 29 October 1961 (age 64) Gurupá, Pará, Brazil
- Party: PDT (1989–present)
- Spouse: Marília Góes
- Children: 4, including João Pedro
- Profession: Politician

Antônio Waldez Góes da Silva (Brazilian Portuguese: [vawˈdɛz ˈɡɔjs]; born 29 October 1961) is a Brazilian politician affiliated with the Democratic Labour Party (PDT). Since 2023, he has served as Ministry of Integration and Regional Development under President Luiz Inácio Lula da Silva. He formerly served as governor of Amapá between 2015 and 2023 and 2003 to 2010.

Political offices
Preceded by Daniel Duarte Ferreira as Minister of Regional Development	Minister of Integration and Regional Development; 2023–present	Incumbent
