= Bruno Araújo =

Brazilian politician

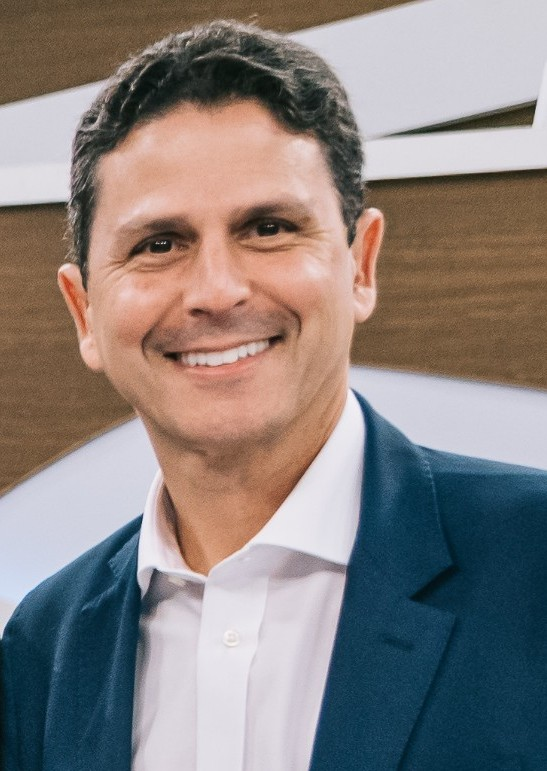

President of the Brazilian Social Democracy Party
- In office 31 May 2019 – 26 January 2023
- Preceded by: Geraldo Alckmin
- Succeeded by: Eduardo Leite

Member of the Chamber of Deputies
- In office 1 February 2007 – 1 February 2019
- Constituency: Pernambuco

Minister of Cities
- In office 12 May 2016 – 14 November 2017
- President: Michel Temer
- Preceded by: Inês da Silva Magalhães
- Succeeded by: Alexandre Baldy

State Deputy of Pernambuco
- In office 1 February 1999 – 1 February 2007
- Constituency: At-large

Personal details
- Born: Bruno Cavalcanti de Araújo; 15 March 1972 (age 54) Recife, Pernambuco, Brazil
- Party: PSDB (1993–present)
- Education: Federal University of Pernambuco
- Occupation: Lawyer

Bruno Cavalcanti de Araújo (born 15 March 1972 in Recife) is a Brazilian lawyer and politician, affiliated with the Brazilian Social Democracy Party (PSDB). He was discharged from his third term as federal deputy for the state of Pernambuco to assume the Ministry of Cities, appointed by the then acting president Michel Temer.

On 17 April 2016, at 11:07 pm (Brasília time zone), Araújo gave the vote 342 that authorized the admissibility of the process of impeachment of president Dilma Rousseff.

He is mentioned in 2017 among the beneficiaries of bribes from the multinational JBS.

Resigned from the office of Minister on 13 November 2017 during a conflict between part of the Brazilian Social Democracy Party and the government.

Araújo was elected National President of the PSDB on 31 May 2019, replacing former Governor of São Paulo, Geraldo Alckmin.

Political offices
Preceded by Inês da Silva Magalhães	Minister of Cities; 2016–2017	Succeeded by Alexandre Baldy
Party political offices
Preceded by Geraldo Alckmin	National President of PSDB; 2019-2023	Succeeded by Eduardo Leite
