= Aguinaldo Ribeiro =

Brazilian politician

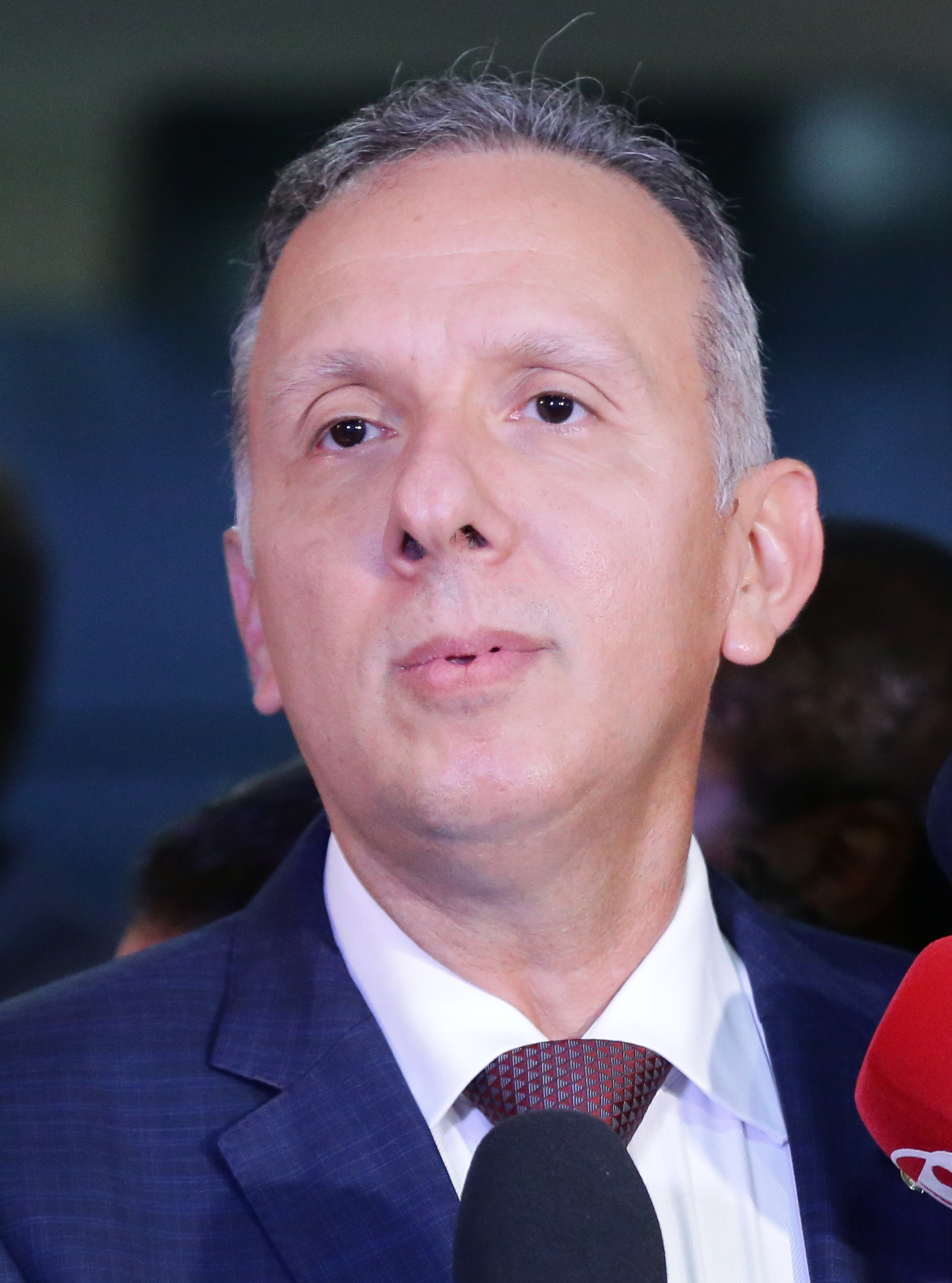
- Ribeiro in 2020

Member of the Chamber of Deputies
- Incumbent
- Assumed office 1 February 2011
- Constituency: Paraíba

Minister of Cities
- In office 7 February 2012 – 17 March 2014
- President: Dilma Rousseff
- Preceded by: Mário Negromonte
- Succeeded by: Gilberto Occhi

Member of the Legislative Assembly of Paraíba
- In office 1 February 2003 – 1 February 2011
- Constituency: At-large

Personal details
- Born: Aguinaldo Velloso Borges Ribeiro; 13 February 1969 (age 57) Campina Grande, Paraíba, Brazil
- Party: PP (1995–present)
- Other political affiliations: PPR (1994–1995)
- Profession: Engineer
- Website: www.aguinaldoribeiro.com.br

Aguinaldo Velloso Borges Ribeiro (born 13 February 1969) is a Brazilian who has served as minister of cities under the Rousseff administration and a member of the champer of deputies from Paraíba.

== Personal life ==
Ribeiro comes from a political family, with his father Enivaldo being the leader of the PP in the state and mayor of Campina Grande from 1977 to 1983; his mother Virgínia was mayor of Pilar, and his sister Daniella is a senator in the local jurisdiction. Ribeiro is a devout Baptist and often takes part with evangelical politicians in campaigning for positions based on Christian values.

Ribeiro was at one time a close ally of Eduardo Cunha, and was one of the few deputies in the senate who did not vote for an investigation into Cunha for corruption. Eventually however Ribeiro relented to pressure from other politicians and voted in favor of the investigation, which lead to Cunha denouncing him as a "traitor, liar, and hypocrite."

== Political career ==
Although initially backing her, Ribeiro would ultimately vote in favor of the impeachment against then-president Dilma Rousseff. He would later back Rousseff's successor Michel Temer against a similar impeachment motion, and also voted in favor of the Brazil labor reform (2017).

=== Controversies ===
Ribeiro has been criticized for promoting his family members to political positions, such as appointing one of his nieces as a manager of a firm where she received 700 hours of paid labor for a job she only had to sporadically come to.

Ribeiro was investigated in Operation Car Wash due to being named by Alberto Youssef. Shortly afterwards Ribeiro and several other politicians were publicly named by Rodrigo Janot in February 2017 as being investigated for taking bribes. In April 2017 it was announced that Ribeiro and 6 politicians were no longer being investigated, with Ribeiro claiming that this was proof of his innocence.

Political offices
Preceded by Mário Negromonte	Minister of Cities; 2012–14	Succeeded by Gilberto Occhi
Chamber of Deputies (Brazil)
Preceded by André Moura	Chamber Government Leader; 2017–19	Succeeded by Vitor Hugo
Preceded by Lelo Coimbra	Chamber Majority Leader; 2019–21	Succeeded by Diego Andrade
Brazilian National Congress
Preceded by Roberto Rocha	Congress Majority Leader; 2021–present	Incumbent
