= Ana Júlia Carepa =

Brazilian politician (born 1957)

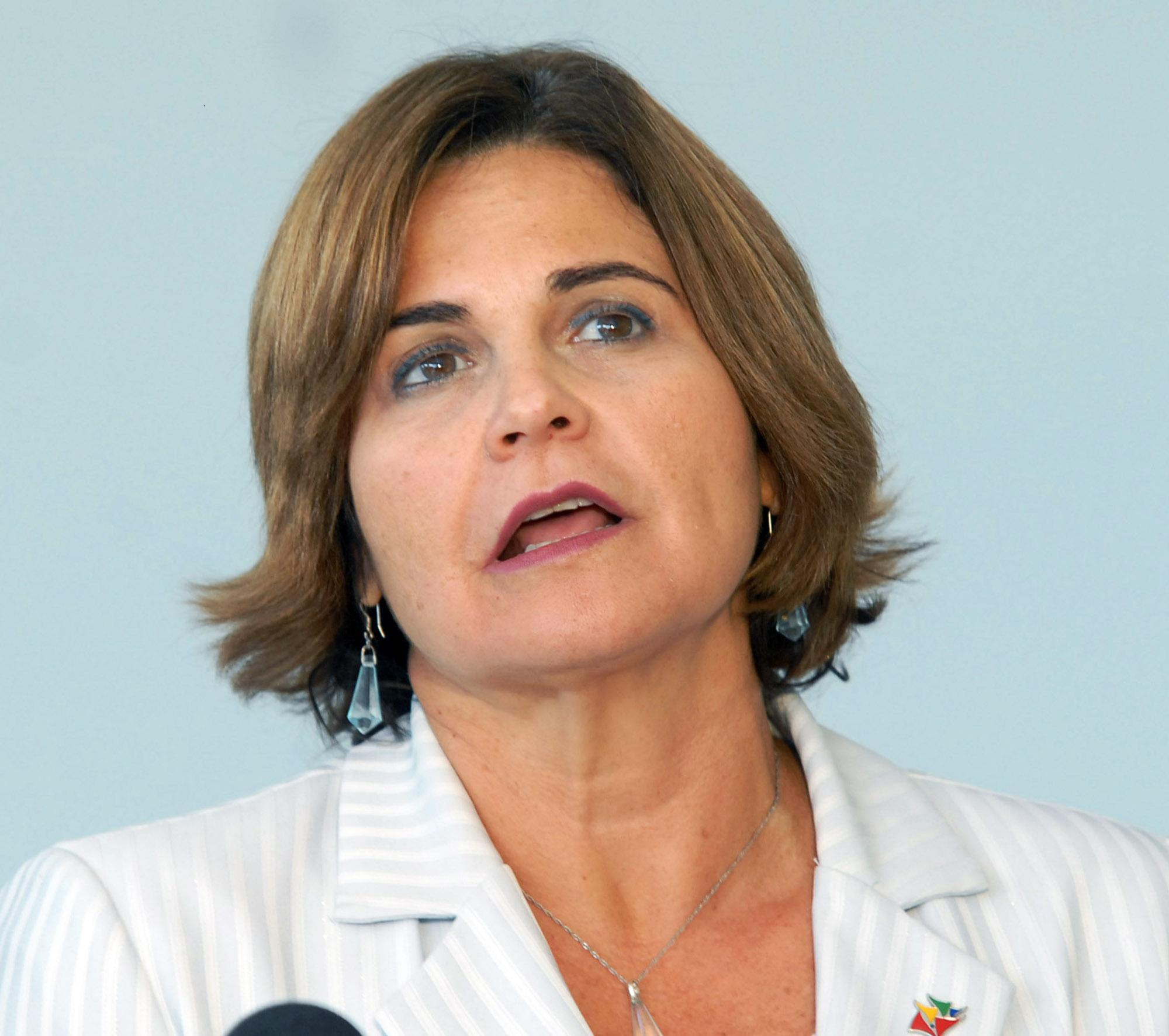

Governor of Pará
- In office 1 January 2007 – 1 January 2011
- Preceded by: Simão Jatene
- Succeeded by: Simão Jatene

Senator for Pará
- In office 1 January 2003 – 31 December 2006

Vice Mayor of Belém
- In office 1 January 1997 – 31 December 2000

Federal Deputy for Pará
- In office 1 February 1995 – 31 December 1996

Personal details
- Born: 12 December 1957 (age 68) Belém, Pará, Brazil
- Party: PT (2022–present)
- Other party: PCdoB (2017–2022); PT (1982–2017)
- Occupation: Politician

Ana Júlia Carepa (born 23 December 1957) is a Brazilian politician and former Governor of the Brazilian state of Pará. She is Pará's first female governor and is a member of the Workers' Party.

== Biography ==
Daughter of Artur Sampaio Carepa and Maria José de Vasconcelos Carepa, Ana Júlia Carepa was born in Belém on December 23, 1957.

Ana Júlia graduated in architecture from the Federal University of Pará (1976–1980). In 1981, she began working at Banco do Brasil and became director of the Brazilian Institute of Architects, Pará department (IAB-PA), where she remained for two years. In 1989 and 1992, she participated in the 1st and 3rd Congresses of Banco do Brasil Employees held in Brasília and São Paulo, respectively, and in 1991, she was elected representative of Pará to the National Council of Banco do Brasil Employees.

In December 2011, she was nominated to assume the position of administrative director at Brasilcap, a bank that operated with capitalization bonds and whose majority shareholder was Banco do Brasil Seguridade. The appointment to the position, for a three-year term, was approved by the Superintendence of Private Insurance (SUSEP), an agency linked to the Ministry of Finance.

Furthermore, Ana Júlia Carepa was married to Rômulo Pais, with whom she had a son, and to Marcílio de Abreu Monteiro, former managing secretary of the Brazilian Institute of Environment and Renewable Natural Resources, with whom she had a daughter.

== Political career ==
A member of the Workers' Party (PT) since 1982, Ana Júlia Carepa ran for her first elected office in the 1992 Belém municipal elections, seeking a seat on the city council. Soon after being elected, she assumed the leadership of the party in the City Council (1993) and chaired the Public Administration Committee (1993–1995).

In the 1994 state elections in Pará, she ran for federal deputy for the PT in coalition with the Green Party (PV) and the Unified Socialist Workers' Party (PSTU). Reaching a total of 31,117 votes (equivalent to 2.97% of valid votes), she resigned her mandate in the Belém City Council and took office in February of the following year. During her term in the Brazilian Chamber of Deputies, she was a full member of the special commission on the irrigation of Marajó Island (1995), and the permanent commissions on Science and Technology, Communication and Informatics (1995 and 1996), and Financial Oversight and Control (1996).

In the 1996 municipal elections, she ran for vice-mayor of Belém on the ticket headed by Edmilson Rodrigues, representing the Frente Belém Popular coalition, composed of the Workers' Party, Green Party, United Socialist Workers' Party, Communist Party of Brazil, Brazilian Communist Party, Popular Socialist Party and Brazilian Socialist Party. In the first round of elections, Ana Júlia Carepa's ticket garnered 244,340 votes (equivalent to 46.51% of valid votes) and advanced to the second round. In the second round, the ticket reached a total of 291,184 votes (equivalent to 57.47% of valid votes) and defeated the Democratic Labour Party candidate, Ramiro Bentes.

In the October 1998 state elections, she ran for senator of Pará as part of the Frente do Povo coalition, composed of the PT, PCdoB, PCB, and PSB parties. Although she received 567,308 votes (equivalent to 34.27% of the valid votes), she was defeated by Luiz Otávio Campos of the Brazilian Progressive Party (PPB).
