= Simão Jatene =

Brazilian politician

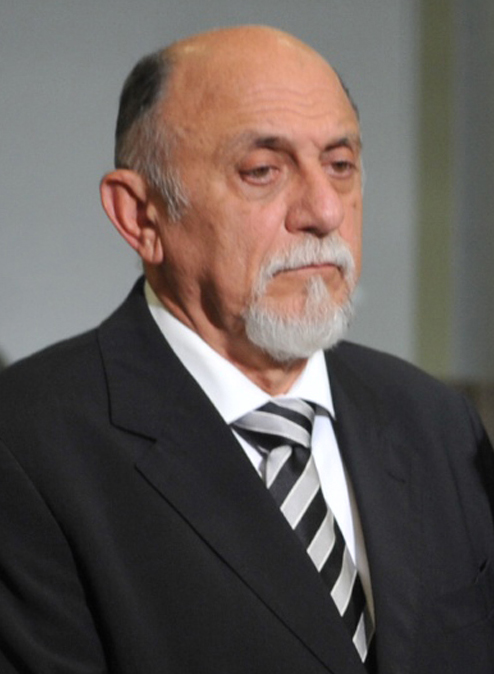

Governor of Pará
- In office 1 January 2011 – 1 January 2019
- Preceded by: Ana Julia Carepa
- Succeeded by: Helder Barbalho
- In office 1 January 2003 – 31 December 2006
- Preceded by: Almir Gabriel
- Succeeded by: Ana Júlia Carepa

Personal details
- Born: 1 April 1949 (age 77) Belém, Pará, Brazil
- Party: PL (2024–present)
- Other political affiliations: PSDB (1988–2021); SOLIDARIEDADE (2022–2024)

Simão Robison Oliveira Jatene is the former Governor of the Brazilian state of Pará.
