= José Priante =

Brazilian politician (born 1963)

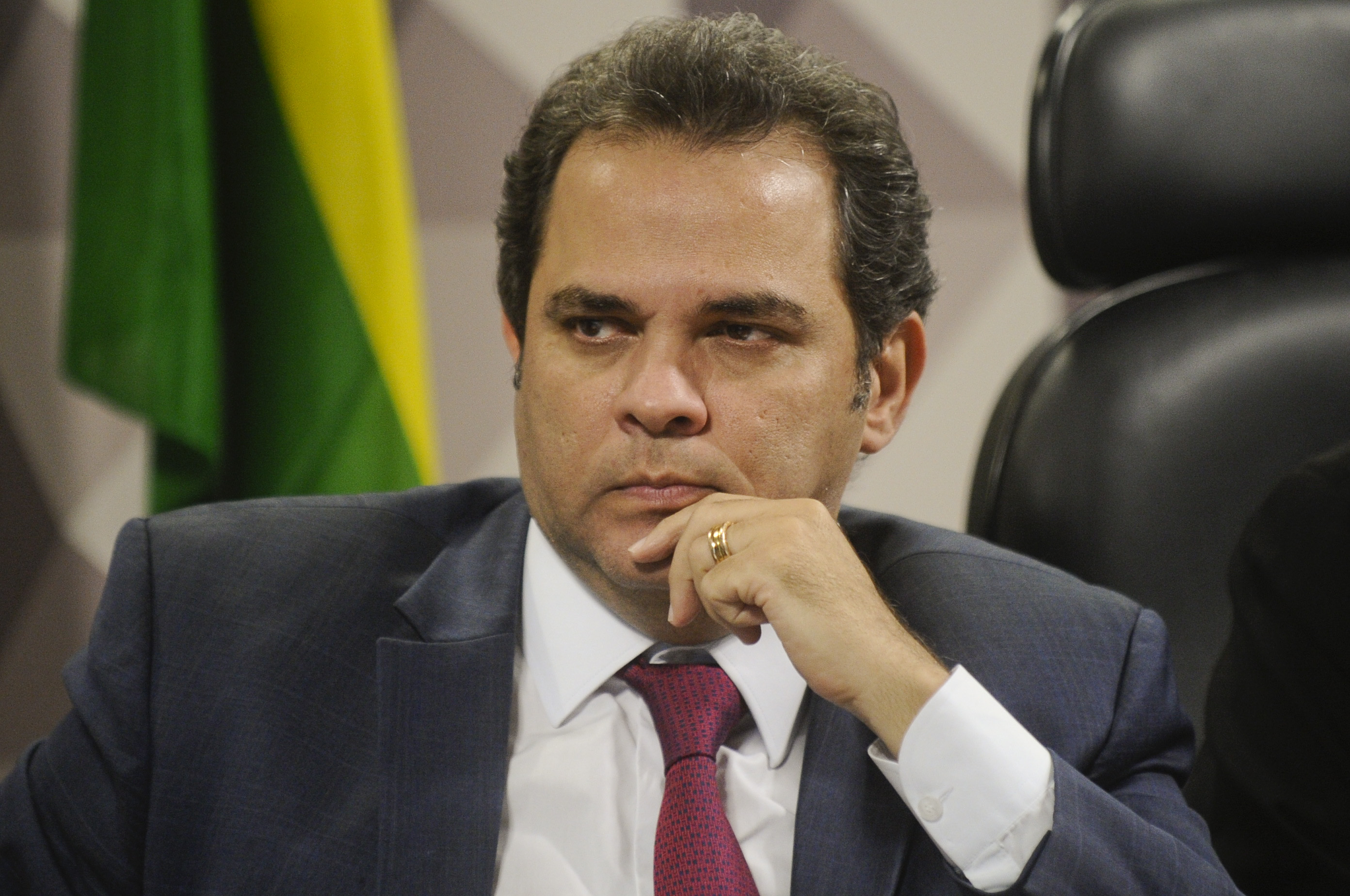
- Priante in 2017

Member of the Chamber of Deputies
- Incumbent
- Assumed office 1 February 2011
- Constituency: Pará
- In office 1 February 1995 – 31 January 2007
- Constituency: Pará

Personal details
- Born: 2 December 1963 (age 62)
- Party: Brazilian Democratic Movement (since 1984)
- Relatives: Helder Barbalho

José Benito Priante Júnior (born 2 December 1963) is a Brazilian politician. He has been a member of the Chamber of Deputies since 2011, having previously served from 1995 to 2007. He is the cousin of Helder Barbalho.
