= João Pedro Góes =

Brazilian politician (born 1998)

Member of the Legislative Assembly of Amapá
- Incumbent
- Assumed office 1 February 2027

Personal details
- Born: 15 May 1998 (age 28)
- Party: Democratic Labour Party
- Parents: Waldez Góes (father); Marília Góes (mother)

João Pedro Brito Xavier Góes (born 15 May 1998) is a Brazilian politician who was elected member of the Legislative Assembly of Amapá in 2026. He is the son of Waldez Góes and Marília Góes.
