= Mário Negromonte =

Brazilian politician (born 1950)

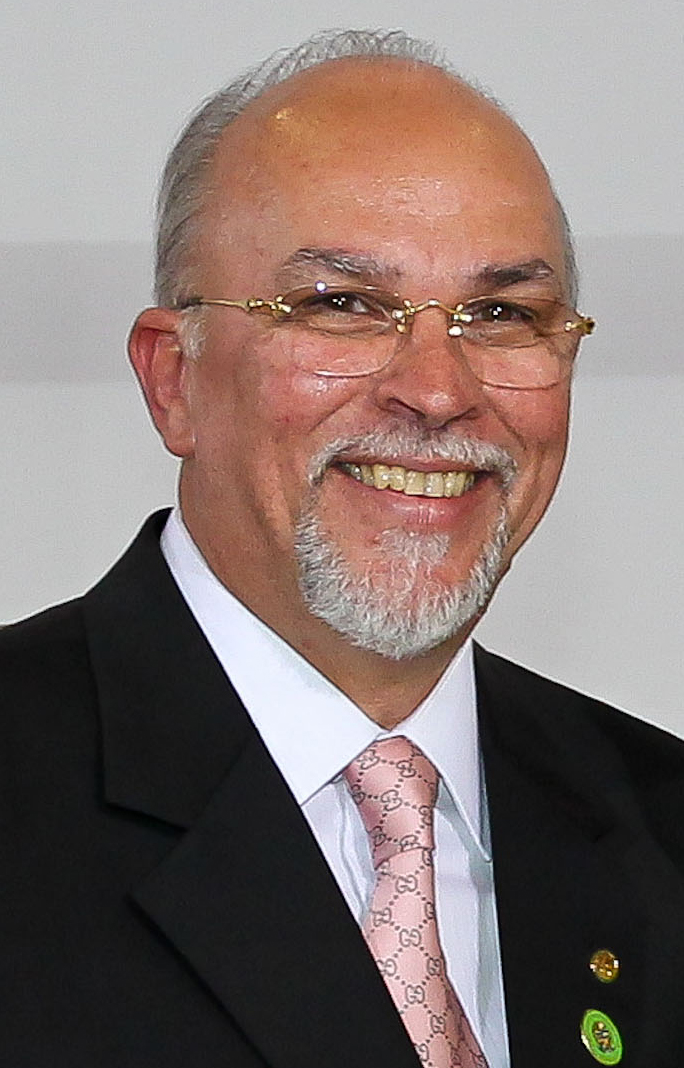
- Negromonte in January 2011

Ministry of Cities
- In office 1 January 2011 – 2 February 2012
- President: Dilma Rousseff
- Preceded by: Márcio Fortes de Almeida
- Succeeded by: Aguinaldo Ribeiro

Federal Deputy from Bahia
- In office 1 February 1995 – 1 February 2015

State Deputy of Bahia
- In office 1 January 1991 – 1 January 1995

Personal details
- Born: 6 July 1950 (age 76) Recife, Pernambuco, Brazil
- Party: PP (2003–present)
- Other political affiliations: PMDB (1986–88); PSDB (1988–2011); PPR (2001–03)

Mário Sílvio Mendes Negromonte (born 6 July 1950) is a Brazilian who has served as minister of cities under the Rousself administration and a member of the chamber of deputies from Bahia. Although born in Pernambuco, he has spent his political career representing the state of Bahia, having served as state representative from 2003 to 2019.

== Personal life ==
Negromonte is married to Vilma Negromonte. His son Mário Negromonte Jr. is also a politician.

== Political career ==
Negromonte was elected state representative of Bahia in 1990 while part of the Brazilian Social Democracy Party. In 1994, he was elected to the federal chamber of deputies, and served for five consecutive terms. He was PP leader in the House of Representatives from 2006 to 2010.

He was appointed minister of cities in December 2010 by then-president Dilma Rousseff. However little more than a year after taking office he was dismissed from the position due to suspected allegations of irregularities in the use of funds.

=== Operation Car Wash ===
Negromonte was investigated in Operation Car Wash due to being named by Alberto Youssef. On 30 March 2016 he was convicted of passive corruption and concealment of more than $25 million that was illegally distributed to fellow politicians. His brother and fellow politician, Adarico Negromonte Filho, was also investigated but ultimately acquitted of charges by the Operation Lava Jato investigation team.

Political offices
Preceded by Márcio Fortes de Almeida	Minister of Cities; 2011–12	Succeeded by Aguinaldo Ribeiro
