= Santa Fé do Sul =

- Municipality
- The Municipality of Santa Fé do Sul
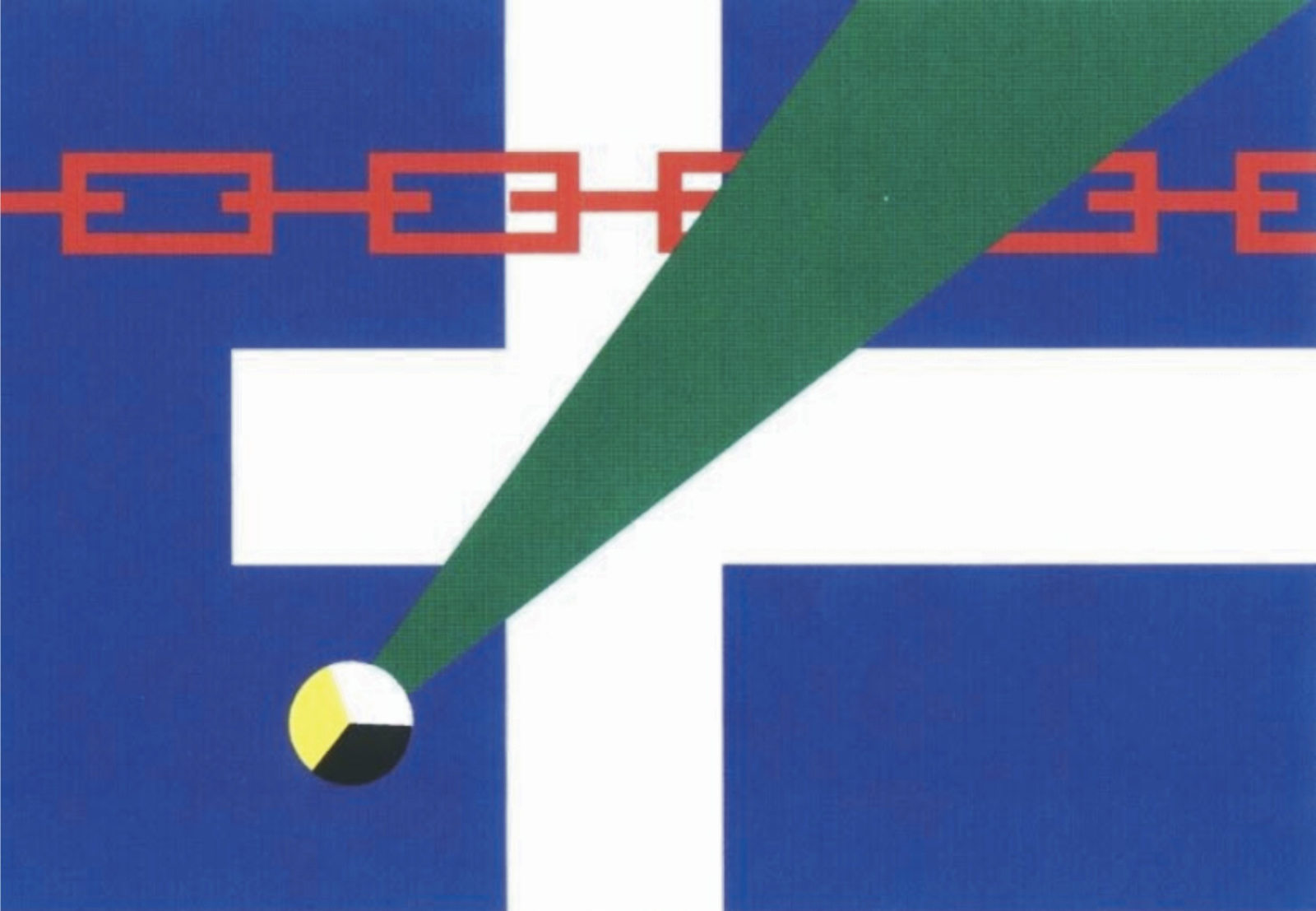
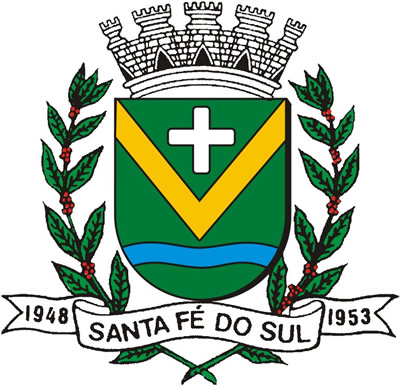
- Flag Coat of arms

- Location of Santa Fé do Sul

- Location within Brazil
- Coordinates: 20°16′08″S 50°32′45″W
- Country: Brazil
- Region: Southeast
- State: São Paulo
- Mesoregion: São José do Rio Preto
- Established: 2009

Government
  - Mayor: Evandro Mura (PSL)

Area
  - Municipality: 208.2 km^{2} (80.4 sq mi)
- Elevation: 370 m (1,210 ft)

Population (2022)
  - Municipality: 34.794
  - Density: 168.46/km^{2} (436.3/sq mi)
  - Urban: 28,088
- Time zone: UTC−3 (BRT)
- Postal Code: 15775-000
- Area code: +55 17
- 'HDI (UNDP/2000): 0.809 – high
- Website: Prefecture of Santa Fé do Sul, São Paulo

Santa Fé do Sul is a municipality in the state of São Paulo, Brazil. The population is of 32,563 (IBGE/2020) and the area is 208.2 km^{2}.

It is located on the northwest of the state, 642 km from the city of São Paulo, and is a tourist resort on the Paraná River. Santa Fé do Sul belongs to the Mesoregion of São José do Rio Preto

== Economy ==
The Tertiary sector is the economic basis of Santa Fé. Commerce, services and public administration corresponds to 63.5% of the city GDP. Industry is relevant, with 34.8% of the GDP, and the Primary sector corresponds to 1.7%.

== Media ==
In telecommunications, the city was served by Telecomunicações de São Paulo. In July 1998, this company was acquired by Telefónica, which adopted the Vivo brand in 2012. The company is currently an operator of cell phones, fixed lines, internet (fiber optics/4G) and television (satellite and cable).

== Geography ==
=== Climate ===
Climate data for Santa Fé do Sul, elevation 412 m (1,352 ft), (2003–2020 normals, extremes 2002–2022)
Month	Jan	Feb	Mar	Apr	May	Jun	Jul	Aug	Sep	Oct	Nov	Dec	Year
Record high °C (°F)	34.0 (93.2)	36.8 (98.2)	35.5 (95.9)	34.8 (94.6)	32.6 (90.7)	33.2 (91.8)	33.3 (91.9)	35.2 (95.4)	36.6 (97.9)	36.6 (97.9)	35.5 (95.9)	35.8 (96.4)	36.8 (98.2)
Mean daily maximum °C (°F)	31.9 (89.4)	32.4 (90.3)	31.9 (89.4)	31.3 (88.3)	28.6 (83.5)	28.4 (83.1)	28.8 (83.8)	30.8 (87.4)	32.6 (90.7)	32.9 (91.2)	32.1 (89.8)	32.0 (89.6)	31.1 (88.0)
Daily mean °C (°F)	26.8 (80.2)	26.9 (80.4)	26.5 (79.7)	25.5 (77.9)	22.4 (72.3)	21.9 (71.4)	21.8 (71.2)	23.2 (73.8)	25.6 (78.1)	26.7 (80.1)	26.5 (79.7)	26.8 (80.2)	25.0 (77.1)
Mean daily minimum °C (°F)	21.6 (70.9)	21.4 (70.5)	21.0 (69.8)	19.6 (67.3)	16.2 (61.2)	15.5 (59.9)	14.8 (58.6)	15.7 (60.3)	18.6 (65.5)	20.5 (68.9)	20.9 (69.6)	21.5 (70.7)	18.9 (66.1)
Record low °C (°F)	16.0 (60.8)	17.0 (62.6)	14.8 (58.6)	10.0 (50.0)	8.0 (46.4)	6.3 (43.3)	5.4 (41.7)	5.9 (42.6)	7.9 (46.2)	12.6 (54.7)	14.4 (57.9)	13.9 (57.0)	5.4 (41.7)
Average precipitation mm (inches)	247.2 (9.73)	138.8 (5.46)	137.7 (5.42)	57.6 (2.27)	57.3 (2.26)	32.4 (1.28)	13.1 (0.52)	17.1 (0.67)	56.6 (2.23)	98.8 (3.89)	117.8 (4.64)	162.8 (6.41)	1,137.2 (44.78)
Average precipitation days (≥ 1.0 mm)	17.4	11.4	10.8	6.3	5.9	3.7	3.1	3.1	5.6	9.3	11.5	14.9	103
Source: Centro Integrado de Informações Agrometeorológicas

== See also ==
- List of municipalities in São Paulo
- Interior of São Paulo
