= Superintendência do Desenvolvimento da Amazônia =

Sudam logo

Superintendência do Desenvolvimento da Amazônia (SUDAM; English: Superintendency of Development for the Amazon) is a local authority of the federal government of Brazil aiming to promote the development of the Amazon region by creating special financial and tax incentives.

== History ==
SUDAM was established in 1966 (60 years ago) during the government of Humberto de Alencar Castelo Branco. Its purpose was to promote the development of the Amazon region, creating special financial and tax incentives to attract private investors, national and international. SUDAM replaced another municipality called the Superintendency of Economic Recovery Plan of the Amazon (Superintendência do Plano de Valorização Econômica da Amazônia, the SPVEA), created by Getúlio Vargas in 1953. The SPVEA also had the objective of developing the Amazon region.

On August 24, 2001, President Fernando Henrique Cardoso, in Interim Measure No. 2.157-5, abolished SUDAM, thanks to the numerous allegations of corruption surrounding the organization. (Reportedly nearly 2 billion dollars were stolen from SUDAM.) In its place, he created by the Amazon Development Agency (Agência de Desenvolvimento da Amazônia, the ADA). The ADA is responsible for the management of development programs relating to the Amazônia Legal region.

In August 2003, President Luiz Inácio Lula da Silva announced the recreation of SUDAM.
