= Elcione Zahluth Barbalho =

Brazilian politician (Federal Deputy)

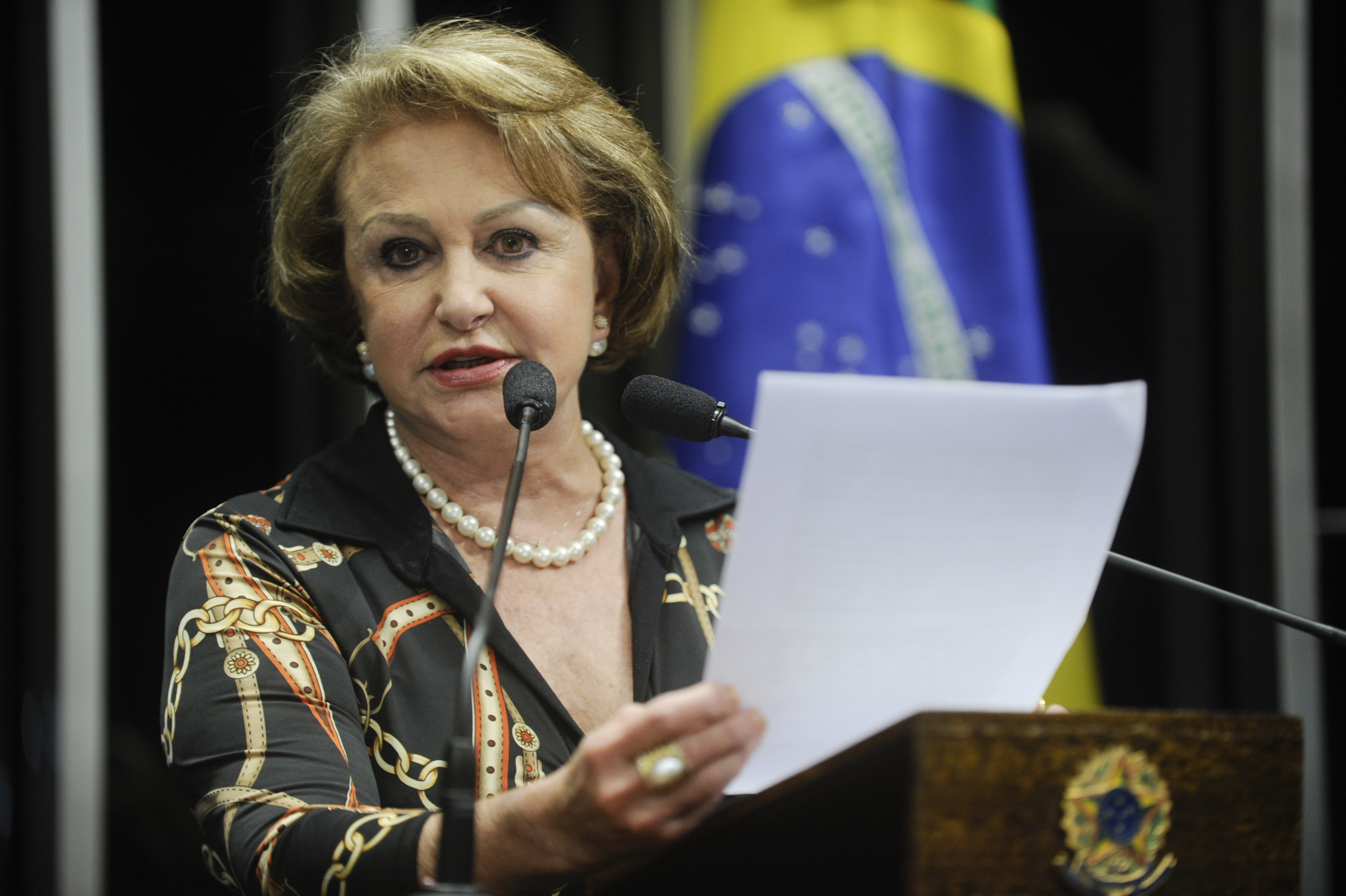

Federal Deputy for Pará
- Incumbent
- Assumed office 1 February 2007
- In office 1 February 1995 – 1 February 2003

Personal details
- Born: Elcione Therezinha Zahluth; 5 December 1944 (age 81) Belém, Pará, Brazil
- Party: Brazilian Democratic Movement
- Spouse: Jader Barbalho (divorced)
- Children: Helder and Jader
- Parents: Domingos Salim Zahluth (father); Nair Rodrigues de Brito Zahluth (mother)
- Education: Federal University of Pará (Bachelor in Pedagogy)
- Profession: Pedagogue
- Website: elcionebarbalho.com.br

Elcione Therezinha Zahluth Barbalho is a Brazilian pedagogue, politician, current Federal Deputy for the Brazilian state of Pará, president of the legislature's Defense of Women Rights Committee, former first lady of the state of Pará during both of her ex-husband's terms as governor (1983–1987 and 1991–1994) and mother of the current governor of the state.
