= Jader Barbalho =

Brazilian politician (born 1944)

- Official portrait

Senator for Pará
- Incumbent
- Assumed office 7 April 2015
- Preceded by: Fernando Ribeiro
- In office 28 December 2011 – 30 January 2015
- Preceded by: José Nery
- Succeeded by: Fernando Ribeiro
- In office 1 February 1995 – 5 October 2001
- Preceded by: Almir Gabriel
- Succeeded by: Fernando Ribeiro

Federal Deputy for Pará
- In office 1 February 2003 – 1 February 2011
- Constituency: At-large
- In office 1 February 1975 – 14 May 1981
- Constituency: At-large

President of the Federal Senate
- In office 14 February 2001 – 19 September 2001
- Preceded by: Antônio Carlos Magalhães
- Succeeded by: Ramez Tebet

Governor of Pará
- In office 1 January 1991 – 3 April 1994
- Vice Governor: Carlos Santos
- Preceded by: Hélio Gueiros
- Succeeded by: Carlos Santos
- In office 15 March 1983 – 15 March 1987
- Vice Governor: Laércio Franco
- Preceded by: Alacid Nunes
- Succeeded by: Hélio Gueiros

Minister of Social Security
- In office 29 July 1988 – 15 March 1990
- President: José Sarney
- Preceded by: Renato Archer
- Succeeded by: Antônio Rogério Magri

Minister of Agrarian Development
- In office 22 September 1987 – 29 July 1988
- President: José Sarney
- Preceded by: Marcos Freire
- Succeeded by: Leopoldo Pacheco Bessone

Personal details
- Born: 27 October 1944 (age 81) Belém, Pará, Brazil
- Party: MDB

Jader Fontenelle Barbalho (born 27 October 1944) is a Brazilian politician, businessman and landowner from the state of Pará. He is currently a member of the PMDB party and a Senator for Pará. He is the father of Hélder Barbalho, former mayor of Ananindeua, Pará, Pará and currently governor of this state. Also, he is the former husband of Federal Deputy Elcione Zahluth Barbalho.

Barbalho is a national figure, known throughout Brazil, albeit a controversial one. There have been raised numerous allegations of corruption and mismanagement of public funds against Barbalho, who owns newspaper Diário do Pará and is part owner of a local TV station (TV Tapajós) of the leading Globo Television network. Starting a political career in Belém with humble possessions, Barbalho became a millionaire after decades in public office. He has held the offices of Federal Deputy over four terms, State Governor twice, Senator thrice and Minister twice.

In 2000, Barbalho was the President of the PMDB party and Senator when a wave of corruption allegations against him took national headlines, involving embezzlement of public funds at the Superintendência de Desenvolvimento da Amazônia (SUDAM - Superintendence for Amazon's Development) development agency and the Instituto Nacional de Colonização e Reforma Agrária (INCRA - National Institute for Colonization and Agrarian Reform). Barbalho was forced to resign the office, later briefly arrested, and the SUDAM was closed. However, he was subsequently elected Federal Deputy in 2002 and 2006 and Senator in 2010.

== Biography ==
=== Youth and education ===
Jader (as he now spells his first name, not Jáder), was born in Belém, capital of Pará. Jader's parents are Laércio Wilson Barbalho (father) and Joanelle Fontenelle Barbalho (mother). Jader studied law at the Federal University of Pará (Universidade Federal do Pará), graduating in 1971, and he became a student leader during Brazil's repressive military dictatorship that was installed after the military coup of 1964.

=== Public offices held ===
- Belém city alderman (Vereador) from 1967 to 1971
- Pará state deputy (Deputado Estadual) from 1971 to 1975
- Federal deputy of Pará (Deputado Federal) from 1975 to 1983, and from 2003 to 2010
- Pará state governor (Governador do Pará) from 1983 to 1987 and from 1991 to 1994
- Senator of Pará (Senador) from 1995 to 2001 and in this position again since 2011.

He was also the federal minister of agrarian development and reform and of social welfare (1988–1990).

=== Scandals ===
In the 1990s, Jader was involved in several corruption scandals and risked impeachment. Facing the threat of impeachment in connection with fraud and corruption scandals, he resigned from the Senate in October 2001.

Barbalho was implicated in a funding scandal at the regional development agency the Superintendency for Development of the Amazon (SUDAM) where over 2 billion dollars went missing. He is alleged to have used his power base in the Amazonian state of Para to influence which projects were approved by SUDAM. SUDAM was closed down in 2001 by President Fernando Henrique Cardoso because of the corruption allegations.

On 22 February 2001, Senator Antônio Carlos Magalhães gave an interview to state prosecutors in which he hinted at corruption involving Cardoso, Barbalho, the PMDB, the PFL, and the Supreme Court. The interview, which was leaked to the press, prompted Cardoso to begin sacking government appointments linked to Magalhães, most notably cabinet ministers Rodolpho Tourinho (mines and energy) and Waldeck Ornelas (social security) on 23 February.

In 2001, with public opinion favouring investigation into allegations of government corruption, the opposition sought the votes of 27 Senators and 171 Federal Deputies in Congress necessary to constitute a joint working committee (CPI) against Barbalho. On 8 May 2001, after the opposition had apparently secured these votes, Barbalho canceled a joint session of Congress and thereby prevented the opposition from bringing the issue to the floor. Afterward, political maneuverings persuaded enough legislators to change their minds, and the CPI threat was ended. On 16 May Saturnino Braga, the rapporteur of the Senate Ethics Committee, concluded that Magalhães and the government leader in the Senate, José Roberto Arruda of the Federal District, were guilty of having violated secrecy rules in the June 2000 vote that expelled Federal District Sen. Luis Estevão from Congress. After damaging testimony from the director of the Senate data-processing system, who stated that she broke into the voting system under orders from Magalhães and Arruda, the Senate Ethics Committee recommended the impeachment of Magalhães and Arruda for having broken Senate decorum. Rather than risk impeachment and a loss of political rights for eight years, Arruda resigned on 24 May; Magalhães followed suit on 30 May 2001.

With Arruda and Magalhães out of office, Congress, at risk of becoming ineffectual, continued to be mired in scandal as more allegations of past corruption involving Barbalho surfaced. A growing number of investigations into fraud in the state Bank of Pará, SUDAM, and the National Land Reform Institute revealed the involvement of Barbalho when he was governor of Pará and minister of land reform. Barbalho took a leave of absence from his post as senate president on 20 July. In the face of mounting evidence and the likelihood of impeachment, he resigned from the Senate on 4 October 2001, following the same path of Magalhães and Arruda.

== Other sources ==
- Manda Bala (Send a Bullet) (2007), a film documentary about crime in São Paulo; Barbalho is a principal subject.
