= Jorge Amado University Center =

Centro Universitário Jorge Amado
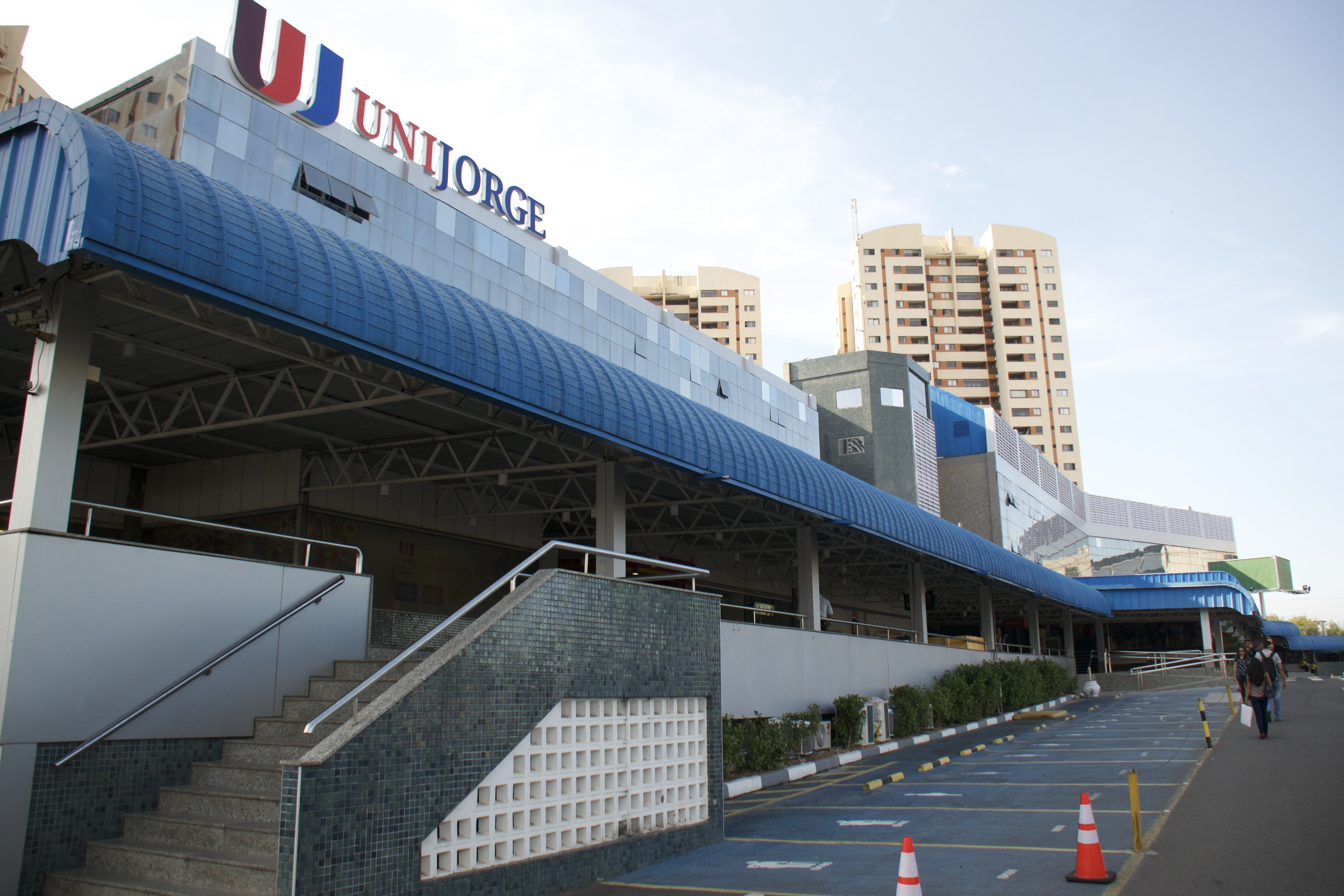
- Type: University
- Established: 1999
- Dean: Professor Paloma Modesto
- Location: Salvador, Bahia, Brazil; 12°56′16″S 38°24′36″W
- Website: Official website

The Centro Universitário Jorge Amado (Jorge Amado University Center, often abbreviated as Unijorge) is a private institution founded in 1999 and located in the city of Salvador, Bahia, Brazil. It has more than 30 undergraduate courses and some post-graduate courses.

== About the institution ==
Located in Salvador, Brazil, a colonial city in the northeastern part of the country, Unijorge is the largest private post-secondary institution in the State of Bahía. Founded 12 years ago, it serves around 20,000 students on its main campus (Paralela Avenue) and three branch campuses via face-to-face (Comércio & Plataforma) and distance learning mode of instruction also in other state (Curitiba/PR).

Unijorge provides undergraduate and graduate degrees as well as continuing education courses in fields including health care, education, technology, engineering, business and tourism, all accredited by the Ministry of Education. 15 percent of Unijorge’s students are enrolled in distance learning programs.

The institution has been recognized in a national survey for its quality of instruction in a distance learning modality by the Brazilian Association of Students in Distance Learning (ABE-EAD).

In 2006, Unijorge became a member of Whitney University System, an organization dedicated to expanding access to post-secondary education to Spanish- and Portuguese-speaking populations through collaborative relationships with Latin American universities.

== Infrastructure ==
Unijorge has a modern campus comprising two buildings, located in the heart of Salvador.

- Digital Labs
- Science Labs
- Auditoriums for 680 people
- Sports facilities
- Radio, Photograph and TV studios
- Library

== Exchange programmes ==
Unijorge has partnership programmes with institutions in Europe and Latin America, as well as with AIESEC and some Brazilian exchange agencies.

== Partner schools ==
- European University (EU) - Barcelona, Geneve, Montreux and Munich
- Institución Universitaria Politécnico Grancolombiano - Bogotá (Colombia)
- ISC Paris – School of Management - Paris (France)
- Universidad Empresarial Siglo 21 - Córdoba (Argentina)
- Universidade Mayor - Santiago (Chile)
- Universidad de Viña del Mar (UVM) - Viña del Mar (Chile)
- Universidad Anáhuac México Sur - Mexico City (Mexico)
- Universidad de Ibagué - Ibagué (Colombia)
- University of Seville - Seville (Spain)
- Universidad Sergio Arboleda - Bogotá (Colombia)
- Universidad Privada Santa Cruz de la Sierra - Santa Cruz de la Sierra (Bolivia)
- Escuela de Artes y Letras - Bogotá (Colombia)
- Universidad de las Palmas de Gran Canaria - Las palmas de Gran Canaria (Spain)
- Amiens School of Management - Amiens (France)
- Escola de Arte e Superior de Deseño Ourense Antonio Failde - Ourense, Galícia (Spain)

== Undergraduate programmes ==
=== Bachelor degree ===
- Management- General
- Management - Systems Analysis
- Management - Finance
- Management - Hospital
- Management - Marketing
- Architecture
- Biological Sciences
- Accounting
- Social Communication - Journalism
- Social Communication - Publicity and Advertisement
- Social Communication - Radio & TV
- Graphic Design
- Law
- Physical Education
- Nursing
- Engineering - Ambiental
- Engineering - Civil
- Engineering - Electrical
- Engineering - Oil and Gas
- Engineering - Production / Industrial
- Engineering - Telecommunications
- Physics
- Physiotherapy
- Speech Therapy
- History
- Nutrition
- Psychology
- International Relations
- Information Systems
- Tourism
- Biological Sciences
- Physics (Teaching)
- Geography (Teaching)
- History (Teaching)
- English Language
- Spanish Language
- Portuguese Language
- Mathematics
- Pedagogy
