= Ministry of Cities =

Federal ministry of Brazil

- Portuguese: Ministério das Cidades
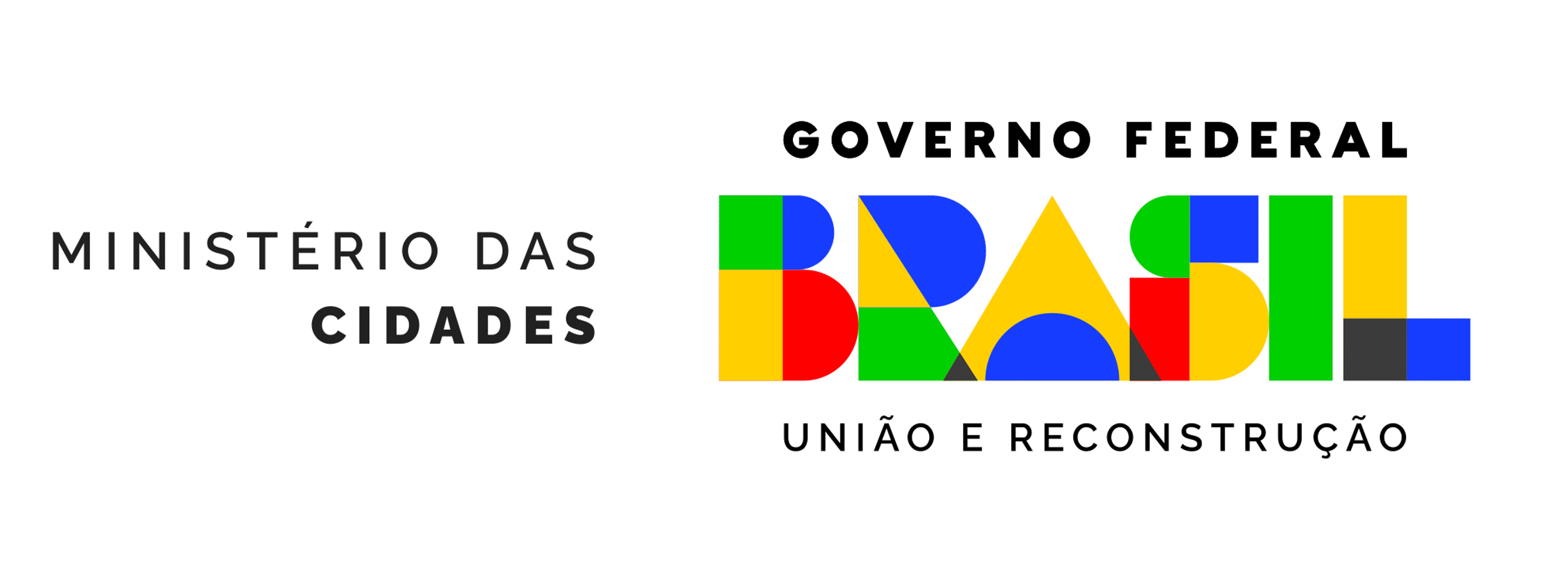

Agency overview
- Formed: 1 January 2003; 23 years ago
- Type: Ministry
- Jurisdiction: Federal government of Brazil
- Headquarters: Esplanada dos Ministérios, Bloco A Brasília, Federal District
- Annual budget: $20.39 b BRL (2023)
- Agency executives: Jader Barbalho Filho, Minister; Sérgio Duarte, Executive-Secretary; Carlos Tome Junior, Secretary of Urban and Metropolitan Development; Hailton Madureira, Secretary of Housing; Denis Andia, Secretary of Urban Mobility; Leonardo Picciani, Secretary of Environmental Sanitation; Guilherme Simões Pereira, Secretary of Suburbs
- Website: www.gov.br/cidades/

The Ministry of Cities (Portuguese: Ministério das Cidades) is a cabinet-level federal ministry in Brazil, created on January 1, 2003.

== History ==
The ministry was created on January 1, 2003, at the start of the first presidency of Luiz Inácio Lula da Silva (Lula). According to The Guardian, "the ministry was set up to tackle the urban chaos of Brazil’s traffic-clogged megacities."

The post was maintained under the subsequent presidencies of Dilma Rousseff and Michel Temer. When Jair Bolsonaro became president on 1 January 2019, he merged the position with the Ministry of National Integration to form the Ministry of Regional Development, under minister Gustavo Canuto.

When Lula became president for the second time, he re-established the ministry on January 1, 2023. Jader Barbalho Filho was appointed Minister of Cities, who pledged to rebuild the Minha Casa, Minha Vida public housing program.

== Structure ==
- National Secretariat for Urban and Metropolitan Development
- National Secretariat for Urban Mobility
- National Housing Secretariat
- National Secretariat for Environmental Sanitation
- National Secretariat of Peripheries

=== Collegiate bodies ===
- Council of Cities (ConCidades)
- Board of Trustees of the Social Development Fund
- Management Council of the National Social Housing Fund
- Interministerial Committee on Basic Sanitation
- Participation Committee of the Residential Leasing Fund

=== Linked agencies ===
- Brazilian Urban Train Company (CBTU)
- Porto Alegre Urban Train Company (Trensurb)

== List of ministers ==
No.	Portrait	Minister	Took office	Left office	Time in office	Party	President
1	Olívio Dutra	Olívio Dutra (born 1941)	1 January 2003	20 July 2005	2 years, 200 days	PT	Luiz Inácio Lula da Silva (PT)
2	Márcio Fortes de Almeida	Márcio Fortes de Almeida (born 1941)	20 July 2005	1 January 2011	5 years, 165 days	Independent	Luiz Inácio Lula da Silva (PT)
3	Mário Negromonte	Mário Negromonte (born 1950)	1 January 2011	2 February 2012	1 year, 32 days	PP	Dilma Rousseff (PT)
4	Aguinaldo Ribeiro	Aguinaldo Ribeiro (born 1969)	7 February 2012	17 March 2014	2 years, 38 days	PP	Dilma Rousseff (PT)
5	Gilberto Occhi	Gilberto Occhi (born 1958)	17 March 2014	1 January 2015	290 days	PP	Dilma Rousseff (PT)
6	Gilberto Kassab	Gilberto Kassab (born 1960)	1 January 2015	15 April 2016	1 year, 105 days	PSD	Dilma Rousseff (PT)
7	Inês da Silva Magalhães	Inês da Silva Magalhães (born 1963)	15 April 2016	12 May 2016	27 days	Independent	Dilma Rousseff (PT)
8	Bruno Araújo	Bruno Araújo (born 1972)	12 May 2016	13 November 2017	1 year, 185 days	PSDB	Michel Temer (MDB)
9	Alexandre Baldy	Alexandre Baldy (born 1980)	22 November 2017	1 January 2019	1 year, 40 days	PP	Michel Temer (MDB)
-	Merged into the Ministry of Regional Development	Merged into the Ministry of Regional Development	1 January 2019	1 January 2023	4 years, 0 days	N/A	Jair Bolsonaro (PL)
10	Jader Barbalho Filho	Jader Barbalho Filho (born 1976)	1 January 2023	Incumbent	3 years, 206 days	MDB	Luiz Inácio Lula da Silva (PT)
