= Ministry of Integration and Regional Development =

Integration ministry body Brazil

- Portuguese: Ministério da Integração e Desenvolvimento Regional
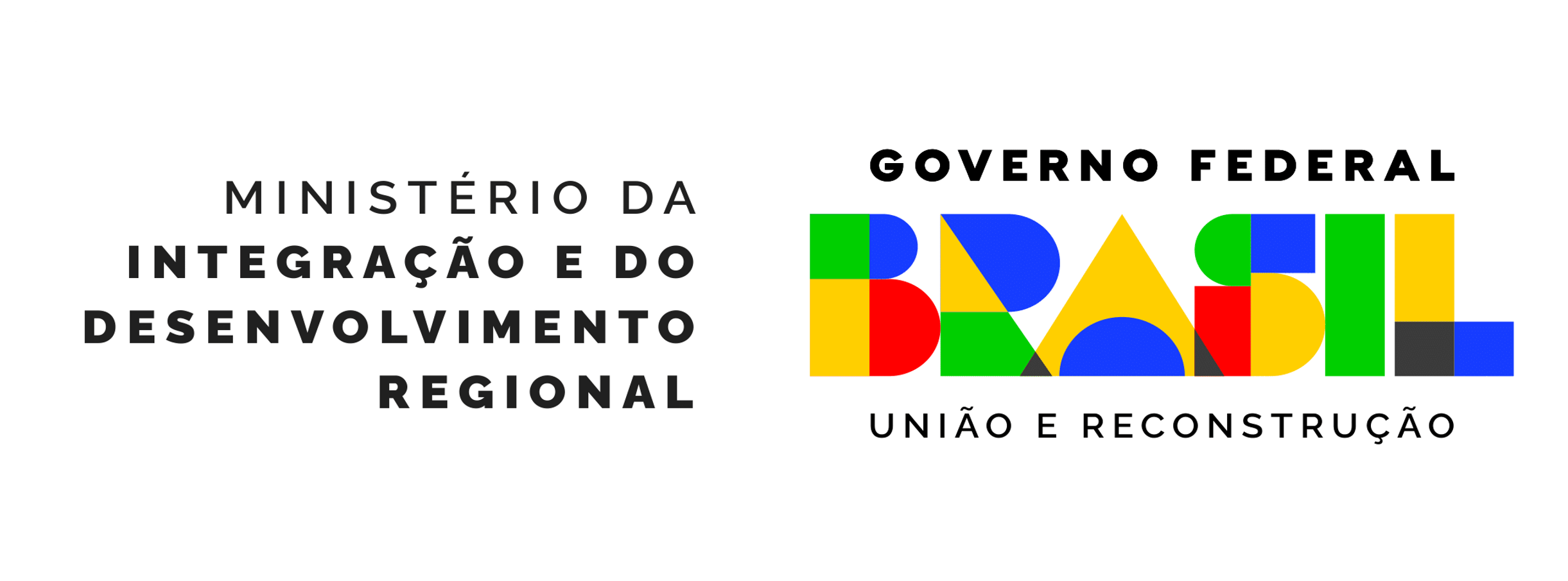

Agency overview
- Formed: 19 July 1999; 25 years ago
- Type: Ministry
- Jurisdiction: Federal government of Brazil
- Headquarters: Esplanada dos Ministérios, Bloco E Brasília, Federal District
- Annual budget: $11.46 b BRL (2023)
- Agency executives: Waldez Góes, Minister; Valder Ribeiro, Executive-Secretary; Adriana Melo, Secretary of Regional and Territorial Development Policies; Wolnei Wolff, Secretary of Protection and Civil Defense; Giuseppe Seca Vieira, Secretary of Water Security; Eduardo Tavares, Secretary of Funds and Financial Resources
- Website: www.gov.br/mdr/

The Ministry of Integration and Regional Development (Portuguese: Ministério da Integração e Desenvolvimento Regional, abbreviated MIDR) is a cabinet-level federal ministry in Brazil, established in 1999. On 1 January 2019 the Ministry of National Integration and the Ministry of Cities were merged and transformed into the Ministry of Regional Development. It was recreated on 1 January 2023.

== Responsibilities ==
The ministry oversees following responsibilities:

- Formulate and conduct the integrated national development policy
- Formulate regional development plans and programs
- Establish integration strategies for regional economies
- Establish guidelines and priorities in the application of resources from financing programs referred to in the Federal Constitution
- Establish guidelines and priorities in the application of resources from the Amazon Development Fund and the Northeast Development Fund
- Establish norms for compliance with the financing programs of constitutional funds and the budgetary schedules of regional investment funds
- Monitor and evaluate integrated national development programs
- Civil defense
- Works against droughts and water infrastructure
- Formulate and conduct the national irrigation policy
- Public works in border strips

== List of ministers ==
No.	Portrait	Minister	Took office	Left office	Time in office	Party	President
1	Fernando Bezerra	Fernando Bezerra (born 1941)	19 July 1999	20 June 2001	1 year, 336 days	PTB	Fernando Henrique Cardoso (PSDB)
2	Ramez Tebet	Ramez Tebet (1936–2006)	20 June 2001	15 September 2001	87 days	MDB	Fernando Henrique Cardoso (PSDB)
3	Ney Suassuna	Ney Suassuna (born 1941)	15 September 2001	5 April 2002	202 days	MDB	Fernando Henrique Cardoso (PSDB)
4	Luciano Barbosa	Luciano Barbosa (born 1958)	5 April 2002	1 January 2003	271 days	MDB	Fernando Henrique Cardoso (PSDB)
5	Ciro Gomes	Ciro Gomes (born 1957)	1 January 2003	31 March 2006	3 years, 89 days	PPS	Luiz Inácio Lula da Silva (PT)
6	Pedro Brito	Pedro Brito (born 1943)	3 April 2006	16 March 2007	347 days	PSB	Luiz Inácio Lula da Silva (PT)
7	Geddel Vieira Lima	Geddel Vieira Lima (born 1959)	16 March 2007	31 March 2010	3 years, 15 days	MDB	Luiz Inácio Lula da Silva (PT)
8	João Santana	João Santana (born 1944)	31 March 2010	1 January 2011	276 days	MDB	Luiz Inácio Lula da Silva (PT)
9	Fernando Bezerra Coelho	Fernando Bezerra Coelho (born 1957)	1 January 2011	1 October 2013	2 years, 273 days	PSB	Dilma Rousseff (PT)
10	Francisco Teixeira	Francisco Teixeira (born 1960)	1 October 2013	1 January 2015	1 year, 92 days	Independent	Dilma Rousseff (PT)
11	Gilberto Occhi	Gilberto Occhi (born 1958)	1 January 2015	13 April 2016	1 year, 103 days	PP	Dilma Rousseff (PT)
12	Helder Barbalho	Helder Barbalho (born 1979)	12 May 2016	6 April 2018	1 year, 329 days	MDB	Michel Temer (MDB)
13	Pádua Andrade	Pádua Andrade (born 1966)	10 April 2018	1 January 2019	266 days	MDB	Michel Temer (MDB)
14	Waldez Góes	Waldez Góes (born 1961)	1 January 2023	Incumbent	2 years, 160 days	PDT	Luiz Inácio Lula da Silva (PT)
