= Alexandre Baldy =

Brazilian politician

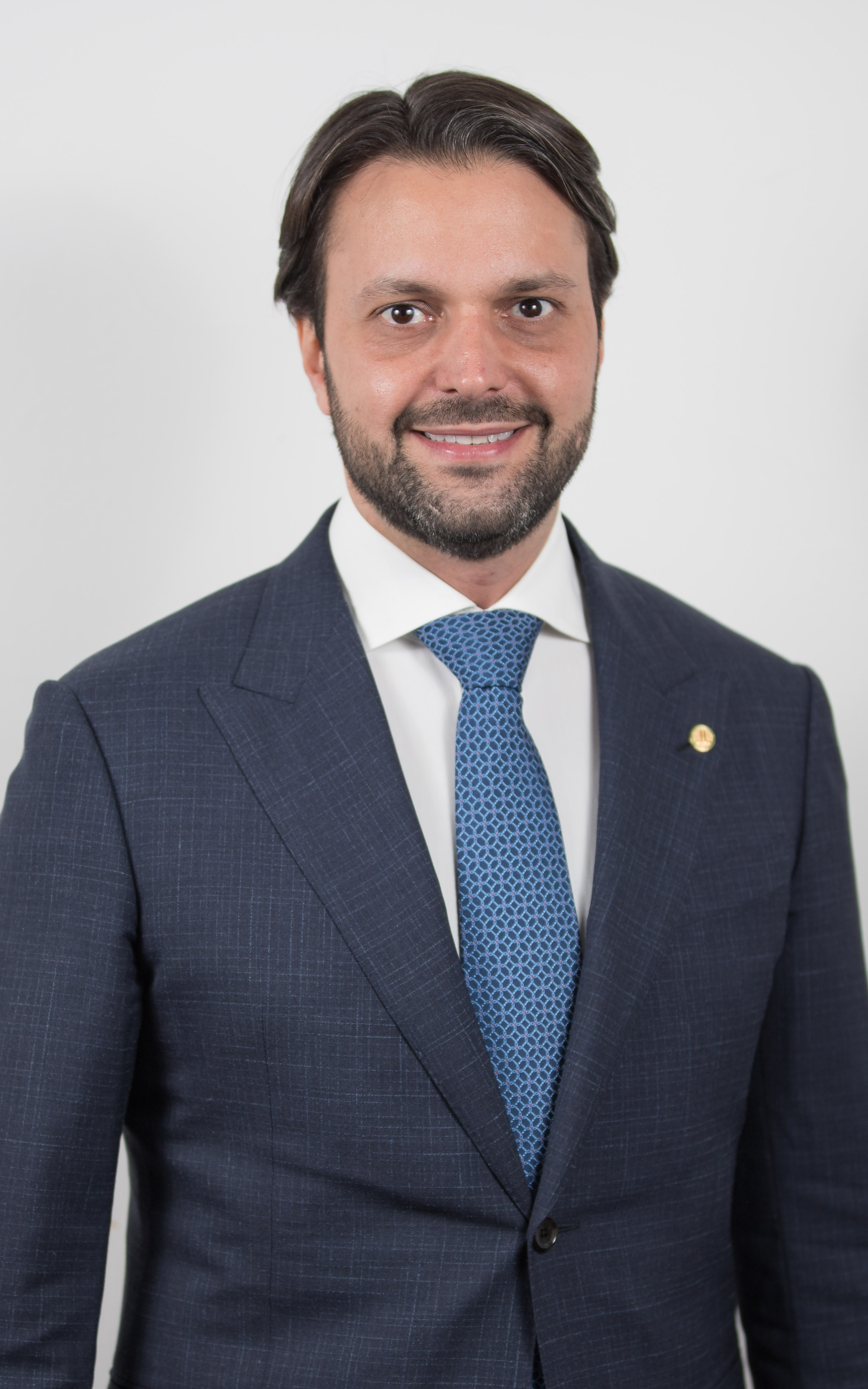

State Secretary of Metropolitan Transports of São Paulo
- In office 1 January 2019 – 18 October 2021
- Governor: João Doria
- Preceded by: Clodoaldo Pelissioni
- Succeeded by: Paulo Galli

Minister of Cities
- In office 22 November 2017 – 1 January 2019
- President: Michel Temer
- Preceded by: Bruno Araújo
- Succeeded by: Office abolished

Federal Deputy from Goiás
- In office 1 February 2015 – 22 November 2017

State Secretary of Industry and Trading of Goiás
- In office 2011–2013
- Governor: Marconi Perillo

Personal details
- Born: Alexandre Baldy de Sant'Anna Braga; 21 July 1980 (age 46) Goiânia, Goiás, Brazil
- Party: PP (2018–present)
- Other political affiliations: PSDB (Before 2016); PODE (2016–2018)
- Education: Pontifical Catholic University of Goiás (PUC-GO)
- Occupation: Politician

Alexandre Baldy de Sant'Anna Braga (born July 21, 1980) is a Brazilian industrialist and politician affiliated with Progressistas (PP). He is currently secretary of Metropolitan Transport in the state of São Paulo, under the João Doria (PSDB) government.

Baldy had been federal congressperson in Goiás and Minister of Cities in Brazil. Between 2011 and 2013, he was Secretary of Industry and Commerce in Goiás, appointed by Governador Marconi Perillo.

On August 6, 2020, Baldy was arrested at his home, at Haddock Lobo Street (São Paulo-SP), during an action by the Federal Police as a result of Operation Lava-Jato, which was cancelled the following day by the STF minister, Gilmar Mendes. According to the Supreme Court's text, "In the case of the procedural records, the possibility of decreeing the claimant's preventive detention was expressly ruled out in the contested decision, given the absolute lack of contemporaneity of the investigated facts.".

== Biography ==
In the 2014 elections, held on 5 October 2014, Baldy was elected Federal Deputy as member of the Brazilian Social Democracy Party (PSDB) from Goiás for the 55th Legislature (2015–2019). During the Legislature, joined Podemos (PODE, former PTN).

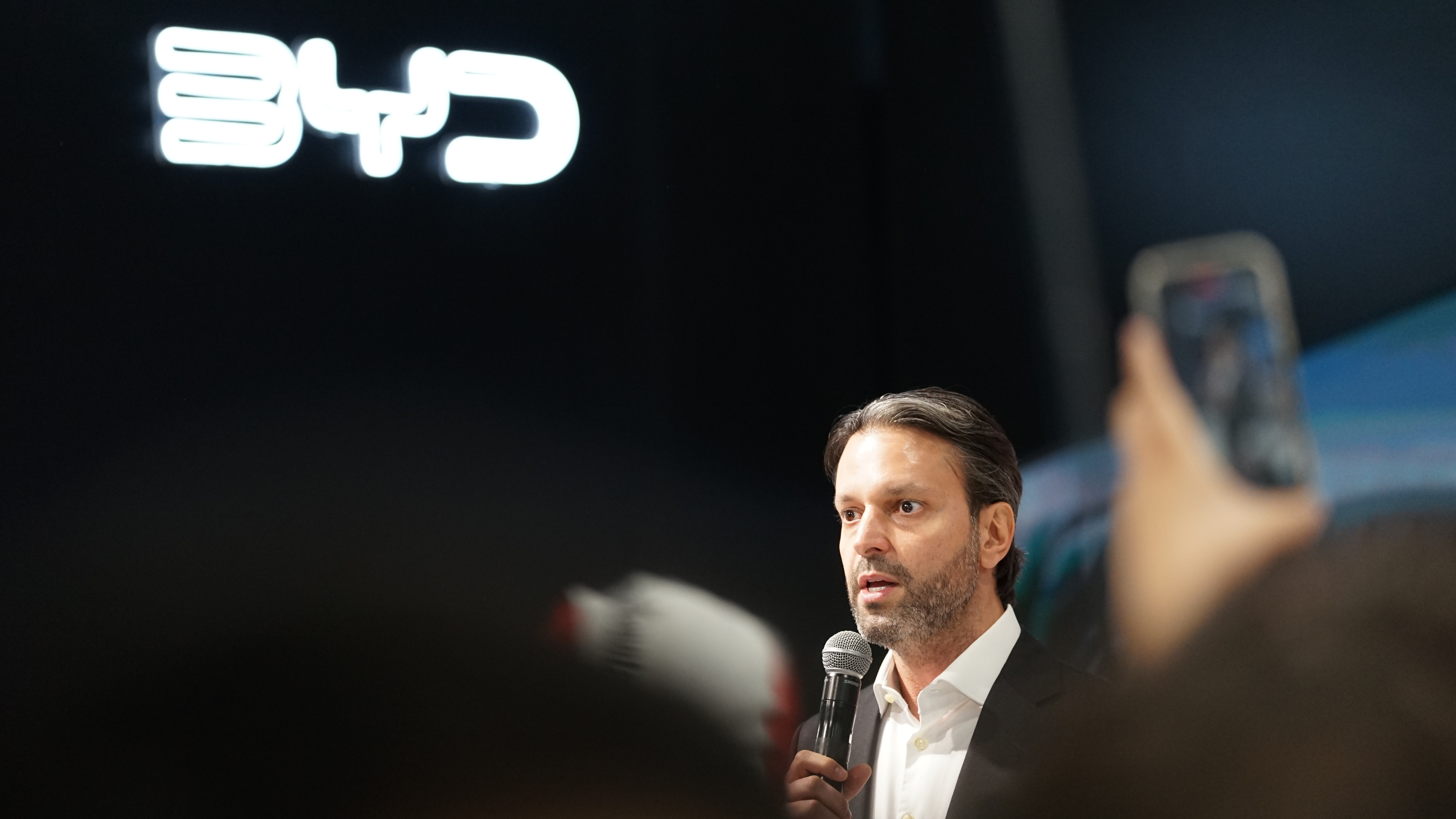
Baldy at Salão do Automóvel de São Paulo (2025)

Voted "Yes" during the Impeachment of Dilma Rousseff. Later, helped the approval of the Constitutional Amendment No. 95 of 2016 (Constitutional Amendment Project of "Ceiling" of Public Expenditure). In April 2017 supported the Labor Reform. On 2 August 2017 he voted against the process which asked for opening of investigation of president Michel Temer, helping discontinue the complaint from the Federal Public Prosecutor's Office.

On the same day, Alexandre was withdrawn from the leadership of Podemos. Later, announced his leaving from the party. Months later, president Michel Temer nominated him for the Ministry of Cities, replacing Bruno Araújo. With the announcement, Baldy said he will join the Progressive Party (PP) to take office as Minister.

Political offices
Preceded by Bruno Araújo	Minister of Cities; 2017–2019	Office abolished
Preceded by Clodoaldo Pelissioni	State Secretary of Metropolitan Transports of São Paulo; 2019–2021	Succeeded by Paulo Galli
