= Ministry of Regional Development (Brazil) =

Regional Development ministry body Brazil

Ministry overview
- Formed: 2019
- Dissolved: 1 January 2023
- Jurisdiction: Federal government of Brazil
- Headquarters: Brasília, Distrito Federal
- Annual budget: R$ 6 billion (2015)
- Minister responsible: Rogério Simonetti Marinho
- Website: www.mdr.gov.br

The Ministry of Regional Development (Portuguese: Ministério do Desenvolvimento Regional, abbreviated MDR) was a cabinet-level federal ministry in Brazil, established in 2019 by the fusion of the Ministry of Integration and Regional Development and the Ministry of Cities. It was dissolved on January 1, 2023 and both of the ministries were recreated.

The MDR was particularly tasked with reducing regional inequality, housing, emergency management, water resources, urban mobility and development, integration and development of the regions of Brazil.
