= Anelis Kaiser =

Swiss neuroscientist

- Education: University of Basel, Switzerland
- Known for: Co-founder of The NeuroGenderings Network
- Scientific career
- Fields: Gender studies, social psychology and social neuroscience
- Workplaces: University of Freiburg, Germany; University of Bern, Switzerland
- Thesis: Geschlecht in der Hirnforschung am Beispiel von fMRI-Sprachexperimenten [Gender in brain research using the example of fMRI language experiments] (2008)
- Website: Official website

Anelis Kaiser is professor of gender studies at MINT, University of Freiburg, Germany. She is also on the lecturer within the social psychology and social neuroscience department at the University of Bern, Switzerland. Along with Isabelle Dussauge, Kaiser was a guest editor of a special issue on Neuroscience and sex/gender of the journal Neuroethics, they also co-founded The NeuroGenderings Network together.

== Education ==
Kaiser gained her PhD from the University of Basel in 2008.

== Research ==
Her work explores the influence of heteronormative notions of sexual orientation and the bias, by some within the scientific community, to demonstrate sex/gender determinism and led her to become a co-founder of The NeuroGenderings Network.

== Bibliography ==
=== Chapters in books ===
- Kaiser, Anelis; Dussauge, Isabelle (2014), "Re-queering the brain", in Bluhm, Robyn; Jaap Jacobson, Anne; Maibom, Heidi Lene (eds.), Neurofeminism: issues at the intersection of feminist theory and cognitive science, Hampshire New York: Palgrave Macmillan, pp. 121–144, ISBN 9781349333929.
- Kaiser, Anelis (2014), "On the (im)possibility of a feminist and queer neuroexperiment", in Schmitz, Sigrid; Höppner, Grit (eds.), Gendered neurocultures: feminist and queer perspectives on current brain discourses, challenge GENDER, 2, Wien: Zaglossus, pp. 41–66, ISBN 9783902902122.
- Kaiser, Anelis; Schmitz, Sigrid (2016), "Neuroscience, brain research, and sexuality", in Naples, Nancy; Hoogland, Renee C.; Wickramasinghe, Maithree; Wong, Wai Ching Angela (eds.), The Wiley Blackwell encyclopedia of gender and sexuality studies: volume 4 J–R, Malden, Massachusetts: Wiley-Blackwell, pp. 1–7, ISBN 9781118663219. doi:10.1002/9781118663219.wbegss233
- Kaiser, Anelis (2016), "Sex/gender matters and sex/gender materialities in the brain", in Pitts-Taylor, Victoria (ed.), Mattering: feminism, science, and materialism, New York: NYU Press, pp. 122–139, ISBN 9781479845439.
- Kaiser, Anelis; Schellenberg, Diana (2017), "The sex–gender distinction: beyond F and M", in Travis, Cheryl; White, Jacquelyn W. (eds.), APA handbook of the psychology of women: volume 1: History, theory, and battlegrounds, Washington, DC: American Psychological Association, ISBN 9781433827921.

=== Journal articles ===
- Kaiser, Anelis; Kuenzli, Esther; Zappatore, Daniela; Nitsch, Cordula (February 2007). "On females' lateral and males' bilateral activation during language production: A fMRI study". International Journal of Psychophysiology. 63 (2): 192–198. doi:10.1016/j.ijpsycho.2006.03.008. PMID 16797758.
- Kaiser, Anelis; Haller, Sven; Schmitz, Sigrid; Nitsch, Cordula (October 2009). "On sex/gender related similarities and differences in fMRI language research". Brain Research Reviews. 61 (2): 49–59. doi:10.1016/j.brainresrev.2009.03.005. PMID 19406148. S2CID 17275248.
- Kaiser, Anelis (2012). "Re-conceptualizing sex and gender in the human brain". Zeitschrift für Psychologie. 220 (2): 130–136. doi:10.1027/2151-2604/a000104.
- Kaiser, Anelis; Dussauge, Isabelle (December 2012). "Neuroscience and sex/gender". Neuroethics. 5 (3): 211–216. doi:10.1007/s12152-012-9165-5.
- Kaiser, Anelis; Fine, Cordelia; Jordan-Young, Rebecca; Rippon, Gina (November 2013). "Plasticity, plasticity, plasticity…and the problem of sex" (PDF). Trends in Cognitive Sciences. 17 (11): 550–551. doi:10.1016/j.tics.2013.08.010. PMID 24176517. S2CID 27589924.
- Kaiser, Anelis; Fine, Cordelia; Joel, Daphna; Jordan-Young, Rebecca; Rippon, Gina (November–December 2014). "Reaction to "Equal ≠ The Same: Sex Differences in the Human Brain"". Cerebrum. 2014. Archived from the original on 2019-02-16.

See also: Cahill, Larry (March–April 2014). "Equal ≠ The Same: Sex Differences in the Human Brain". Cerebrum. 2014: 5. PMC 4087190. PMID 25009695. Archived from the original on 2019-03-10.

- Kaiser, Anelis; Rippon, Gina; Jordan-Young, Rebecca; Fine, Cordelia (28 August 2014). "Recommendations for sex/gender neuroimaging research: key principles and implications for research design, analysis and interpretation". Frontiers in Human Neuroscience. 8 (650): 650. doi:10.3389/fnhum.2014.00650. PMC 4147717. PMID 25221493.
- Kaiser, Anelis; Stein, Maria; Winkler, Carmen; Dierks, Thomas (2 October 2014). "Structural brain changes related to bilingualism: Does immersion make a difference?". Frontiers in Psychology. 5 (1116): 1116. doi:10.3389/fpsyg.2014.01116. PMC 4183087. PMID 25324816.
- Kaiser, Anelis; Rippon, Gina; Jordan-Young, Rebecca; Joel, Daphna; Fine, Cordelia (July 2017). "Journal of Neuroscience Research policy on addressing sex as a biological variable: Comments, clarifications, and elaborations". Journal of Neuroscience Research. 95 (7): 1357–1359. doi:10.1002/jnr.24045. hdl:11343/292471. PMID 28225166. S2CID 45664076.

== See also ==
- Cognitive neuroscience
- Gender essentialism
- Neuroscience of sex differences
- List of cognitive neuroscientists
- List of developmental psychologists
