= The NeuroGenderings Network =

International group of researchers in neuroscience and gender studies

- Formation: September 15, 2012; 13 years ago
- Founders: Isabelle Dussauge and Anelis Kaiser
- Founded at: Uppsala, Sweden
- Purpose: To critically examine neuroscientific knowledge production and to develop differentiated approaches for a more gender adequate neuroscientific research.
- Fields: Critical neuroscientific research into sex differences
- Website: Official website

The NeuroGenderings Network is an international group of researchers in neuroscience and gender studies. Members of the network study how the complexities of social norms, varied life experiences, details of laboratory conditions and biology interact to affect the results of neuroscientific research. Working under the label of "neurofeminism", they aim to critically analyze how the field of neuroscience operates, and to build an understanding of brain and gender that goes beyond gender essentialism while still treating the brain as fundamentally material. Its founding was part of a period of increased interest and activity in interdisciplinary research connecting neuroscience and the social sciences.

== History ==
The group, comprising scholars who specialized in feminism, queer theory and gender studies, formed to tackle "neurosexism" as defined by Cordelia Fine in her 2010 book Delusions of Gender: "uncritical biases in [neuroscientific] research and public perception, and their societal impacts on an individual, structural, and symbolic level." Research can suffer from neurosexism by failing to include the social factors and expectations that shape sex differences, which possibly leads to making inferences based on flawed data.

By contrast, the network members advocate "neurofeminism", aiming to critically evaluate heteronormative assumptions of contemporary brain research and examine the impact and cultural significance of neuroscientific research on society's views about gender. This includes placing greater emphasis on neuroplasticity rather than biological determinism.

=== Conferences ===
In March 2010, the first conference – NeuroGenderings: Critical Studies of the Sexed Brain – was held in Uppsala, Sweden. Organisers Anelis Kaiser and Isabelle Dussauge described its long terms goals "to elaborate a new conceptual approach of the relation between gender and the brain, one that could help to head gender theorists and neuroscientists to an innovative interdisciplinary place, far away from social and biological determinisms but still engaging with the materiality of the brain." The NeuroGenderings Network was established at this event, with the group's first results published in a special issue of the journal Neuroethics.

Further conferences have since been held on a biennial basis: NeuroCultures — NeuroGenderings II, September 2012 at the University of Vienna's physics department; NeuroGenderings III – The First International Dissensus Conference on Brain and Gender, May 2014 in Lausanne, Switzerland; and NeuroGenderings IV in March 2016, at Barnard College, New York City.

== Members ==
The members of the NeuroGenderings Network are:

- Robyn Bluhm
- Tabea Cornel
- Isabelle Dussauge
- Gillian Einstein
- Cordelia Fine
- Hannah Fitsch
- Giordana Grossi
- Christel Gumy
- Nur Zeynep Gungor
- Daphna Joel
- Rebecca Jordan-Young
- Anelis Kaiser
- Emily Ngubia Kessé
- Cynthia Kraus
- Victoria Pitts-Taylor
- Gina Rippon
- Deboleena Roy
- Raffaella Rumiati
- Sigrid Schmitz
- Catherine Vidal
- Katherine Bryant

== Bibliography ==
Books

- Fine, Cordelia (2010). Delusions of gender: how our minds, society, and neurosexism create difference. New York: W.W. Norton. ISBN 9780393068382.
- Bluhm, Robyn; Maibom, Heidi Lene; Jaap Jacobson, Anne (2012). Neurofeminism: issues at the intersection of feminist theory and cognitive science. New York: Palgrave Macmillan. ISBN 9780230296732. Also available to view by chapter online.
- Schmitz, Sigrid; Höppner, Grit, eds. (2014). Gendered neurocultures: feminist and queer perspectives on current brain discourses. challenge GENDER, 2. Wien: Zaglossus. ISBN 9783902902122.
- Rippon, Gina (2019). Gender and Our Brains: How New Neuroscience Explodes the Myths of the Male and Female Minds. New York: Knopf Doubleday. ISBN 9781524747039.

Book chapters

- Kaiser, Anelis (2010). "Sex/Gender and neuroscience: focusing on current research". In Blomqvist, Martha; Ehnsmyr, Ester (eds.). Never mind the gap! Gendering science in transgressive encounters. Uppsala Sweden: Skrifter från Centrum för genusvetenskap. University Printers. pp. 189–210. ISBN 9789197818636.
- Schmitz, Sigrid (2014). "Sex, gender, and the brain – biological determinism versus socio-cultural constructivism". In Klinge, Ineke; Wiesemann, Claudia (eds.). Sex and gender in biomedicine: theories, methodologies, results. Akron, Ohio: University Of Akron Press. pp. 57–76. ISBN 9781935603689.
- Kaiser, Anelis; Dussauge, Isabelle (2014). "Re-queering the brain". In Bluhm, Robyn; Japp Jacobson, Anne; Maibom, Heidi Lene (eds.). Neurofeminism: issues at the intersection of feminist theory and cognitive science. Hampshire New York: Palgrave Macmillan. pp. 121–144. ISBN 9781349333929.
- Kraus, Cynthia (2016), "What is the feminist critique of neuroscience? A call for dissensus studies", in de Vos, Jan; Pluth, Ed, eds. (2016). Neuroscience and critique: exploring the limits of the neurological turn. London New York: Routledge. pp. 100–116. ISBN 9781138887350.

Journal articles

- Hyde, Janet Shibley (September 2005). "The gender similarities hypothesis". American Psychologist. 60 (6): 581–592. CiteSeerX 10.1.1.374.1723. doi:10.1037/0003-066X.60.6.581. PMID 16173891.
- Nash, Alison; Grossi, Giordana (2007). "Picking Barbie™'s brain: inherent sex differences in scientific ability?". Journal of Interdisciplinary Feminist Thought. 2 (1): 5. Pdf.
- Schmitz, Sigrid; Höppner, Grit (25 July 2014). "Neurofeminism and feminist neurosciences: a critical review of contemporary brain research". Frontiers in Human Neuroscience. 8 (article 546): 546. doi:10.3389/fnhum.2014.00546. PMC 4111126. PMID 25120450.
- Roy, Deboleena (Spring 2016). "Neuroscience and feminist theory: a new directions essay". Signs. 41 (3): 531–552. doi:10.1086/684266. S2CID 146995854.

Opposing publications

Below is a list of works which cause the network concern due to their "neurodeterminist notions of a ‘sexed brain’ [which] are being transported into public discourse [..] without reflecting the biases in empirical work."

- Pease, Allan; Pease, Barbara (2001). Why men don't listen & women can't read maps. Sydney, NSW: Pease International. ISBN 9780957810815.
- Cahill, Larry (October 1, 2012). "His brain, her brain". Scientific American. 292 (5): 22–29. PMID 15882020.
- Cahill, Larry (January–February 2017). "An issue whose time has come (editorial)". Journal of Neuroscience Research. 95 (1–2): 12–13. doi:10.1002/jnr.23972. PMID 27870429.
- Brizendine, Louann (2009). The female brain. London: Bantham. ISBN 9781407039510.
- Brizendine, Louann (2011). The male brain. Edinburgh: Harmony. ISBN 9780767927543.
- Gray, John (2004). Men are from Mars, women are from Venus: the classic guide to understanding the opposite sex. New York: HarperCollins Publishers. ISBN 9780060574215.

== See also ==
- Feminist movements and ideologies
- Gender essentialism
- Heteronormativity
- Neuroscience of sex differences
- Neurogender
- Neuroqueer theory
