= Gina Rippon =

Professor of cognitive neuroimaging

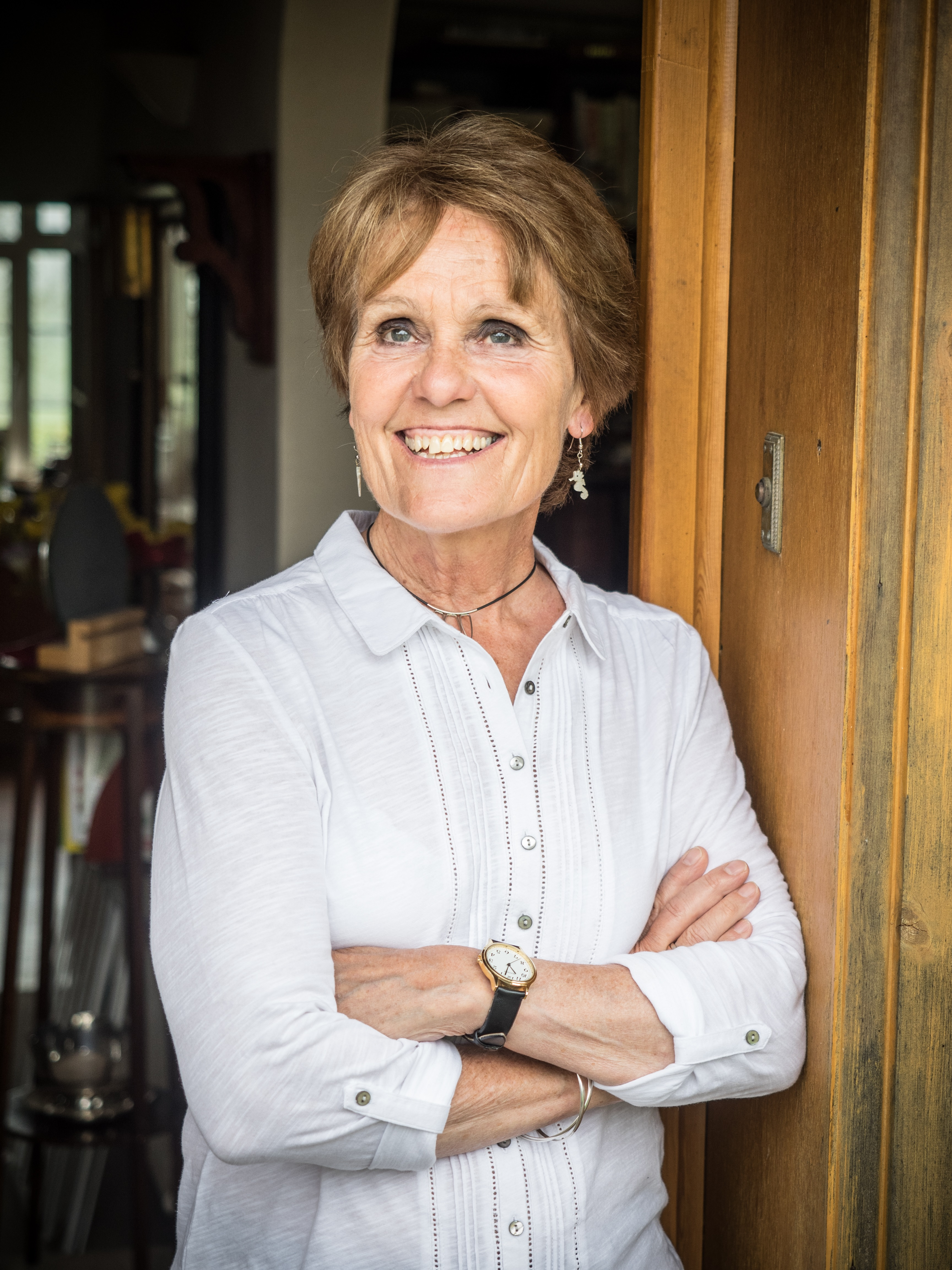
- Rippon in 2016
- Born: Georgina Mary Jane Rippon; 1950 (age 75–76)
- Scientific career
- Fields: Cognitive neuroimaging
- Workplaces: Aston University, Birmingham
- Thesis: The orienting reflex in normal and in schizophrenic subjects (1982)
- Website: Official website

Gina Rippon (born 1950) is a British neurobiologist and feminist. She is a professor emeritus of cognitive neuroimaging at the Aston Brain Centre, Aston University, Birmingham. Rippon has also sat on the editorial board of the International Journal of Psychophysiology. In 2019, Rippon published her book, Gendered Brain: The New Neuroscience that Shatters the Myth of the Female Brain, which investigates the role of life experiences and biology in brain development.

== Career ==
=== Researcher ===
Rippon gained her PhD in 1982 in physiological psychology, and then focused on brain processes and schizophrenia. Rippon's research applies brain imaging techniques, particularly electroencephalography (EEG) and magnetoencephalography (MEG), and uses cognitive neuroscience paradigms to study normal and abnormal cognitive processes. Her work has also focused on Autistic Spectrum Disorders and to developmental dyslexia.

=== Gendered Brain ===
In 2019, Rippon released her book, Gendered Brain: The New Neuroscience that Shatters the Myth of the Female Brain.

==== Reviews ====
In a review for Nature, neuroscientist Lise Elliot wrote that Rippon's book accomplishes its goal of debunking the concept of a gendered brain. Rhonda Voskuhl and Sabra Klein, of the Organization for the Study of Sex Differences, responded in Nature to Eliot's review, arguing against the idea that sex differences in behavior are due only to culture, and criticizing Eliot's claim that the brain is "no more gendered than the liver or kidneys or heart". They state that biological and cultural effects are not mutually exclusive, and that sex differences occur also in animals, who are not affected by culture. In a review for The Times, psychologist Simon Baron-Cohen stated that "most biologists and neuroscientists agree that prenatal biology and culture combine to explain average sex differences in the brain". He argues that Rippon "[boxes] herself into an extremist position by arguing that it’s all culture and no biology". Writing for The Guardian, Rachel Cooke writes that the book is a "brilliant debunking of the notion of a ‘female brain’". In a mixed review at The New York Journal of Books, Jane Hale noted the book could be improved by finding "a social scientist to partner with".

== Views ==
=== Criticism of 'neurotrash' ===
Rippon is critical of what she sees as the misrepresentation and hijacking of neuroscience, what she calls 'neurotrash'. "The logic of their argument is that males and females are biologically different, men and women are behaviourally different, so their behavioural differences are biologically caused and cannot and, more importantly, should not be challenged or changed. I aim to... produce a guide to spotting such ‘neurononsense’." Neurotrashers, she says, "extrapolate wildly" from their data and believes that their science can be used for "social engineering" to reinforce perceived male and female roles and status. She says that neurotrashers perpetuate the idea "that biology is destiny. If you are biologically different that's it and if you fight against it in any particular way that's going to be damaging." Rippon cites the work of Louann Brizendine as examples of neurotrash and has also criticized experiments done by Simon Baron-Cohen.

=== Sex differences in the brain ===
Rippon does not believe that there is a "single item type as a male brain or a female brain", instead that "everybody is actually made up of a whole pattern of things, which is maybe due to their biology and maybe due to their different experiences in life." She puts forward the idea that "every brain is different from every other brain".

Rippon is also opposed to the "continued emphasis on 'essentialist', brain-based explanations in both public communication of, and research into, many forms of gender imbalance." When asked for a comparable "watershed" moment in science to compare her findings to, Rippon responded "the idea of the Earth circling around the sun".

Rippon states that "I do think there are sex differences in the brain; there are bound to be, with respect to different roles in the reproductive process". She expanded that, when discussing brain differences, "there are sex differences that we should pay attention to, but the power that’s attributed to biology is what needs challenging".

== Media appearances ==
Rippon appeared on BBC Radio 4's Today programme alongside professor Robert Winston and BBC's No More Boys And Girls: Can Our Kids Go Gender Free?. She was interviewed on the podcast NOUS on the publication of her book The Gendered Brain, where she responded to her critics.

== Bibliography ==
Books

- Rippon, Gina (2019). Gendered Brain: the new neuroscience that shatters the myth of the female brain. London: The Bodley Head Ltd. ISBN 9781847924759.

Journal articles

- Rippon, Gina (September 2008). "Atypical connectivity in autistic spectrum disorders". International Journal of Psychophysiology. 69 (3): 204. doi:10.1016/j.ijpsycho.2008.05.577.
- Rippon, Gina; Longe, Olivia A.; Senior, Carl (January 2009). "The lateral and ventromedial prefrontal cortex work as a dynamic integrated system: evidence from FMRI connectivity analysis" (PDF). Journal of Cognitive Neuroscience. 21 (1): 141–154. doi:10.1162/jocn.2009.21012. PMID 18476765. S2CID 7696695.
- Rippon, Gina; Maratos, Frances A.; Mogg, Karin; Bradley, Brendan P.; Senior, Carl (June 2009). "Coarse threat images reveal theta oscillations in the amygdala: a magnetoencephalography study". Cognitive, Affective, & Behavioral Neuroscience. 9 (2): 133–143. doi:10.3758/CABN.9.2.133. PMID 19403890.
- Rippon, Gina; Longe, Olivia A.; Thai, Ngoc Jade (July 2009). "Disconnected brains: What is the role of fMRI in connectivity research?". International Journal of Psychophysiology. 73 (1): 27–32. doi:10.1016/j.ijpsycho.2008.12.015. PMID 19530277.
- Rippon, Gina; Longe, Olivia A.; Maratos, Frances A.; Gilbert, Paul; Evans, Gaynor; Volker, Faye; Rockliff, Helen (15 January 2010). "Having a word with yourself: Neural correlates of self-criticism and self-reassurance" (PDF). NeuroImage. 49 (2): 1849–1856. doi:10.1016/j.neuroimage.2009.09.019. PMID 19770047. S2CID 9912957.
- Rippon, Gina; Senior, Carl (April–June 2010). "Neuroscience has no role in national security". AJOB Neuroscience. 1 (2): 37–38. doi:10.1080/21507741003699322. S2CID 144059696.
- Rippon, Gina; Foley, Elaine; Thai, Ngoc Jade; Longe, Olivia A.; Senior, Carl (February 2012). "Dynamic facial expressions evoke distinct activation in the face perception network: a connectivity analysis study" (PDF). Journal of Cognitive Neuroscience. 24 (2): 507–520. doi:10.1162/jocn_a_00120. PMID 21861684. S2CID 1737641.
- Rippon, Gina; Brunswick, Nicola; Martin, G. Neil (February 2012). "Early cognitive profiles of emergent readers: A longitudinal study" (PDF). Journal of Experimental Child Psychology. 111 (2): 268–285. doi:10.1016/j.jecp.2011.08.001. PMID 21962459.
- Rippon, Gina; Maratos, Frances A.; Senior, Carl; Mogg, Karin; Bradley, Brendan P. (March 2012). "Early gamma-band activity as a function of threat processing in the extrastriate visual cortex". Cognitive Neuroscience. 3 (1): 62–68. doi:10.1080/17588928.2011.613989. PMC 3259620. PMID 22328903.
- Rippon, Gina; McNab, Fiona; Hillebrand, Arjan; Swithenby, Stephen J. (9 August 2012). "Combining temporal and spectral information with spatial mapping to identify differences between phonological and semantic networks: a magnetoencephalographic approach". Frontiers in Psychology. 3: 273. doi:10.3389/fpsyg.2012.00273. PMC 3415264. PMID 22908001.
- Rippon, Gina; Fine, Cordelia; Jordan-Young, Rebecca; Kaiser, Anelis (November 2013). "Plasticity, plasticity, plasticity…and the rigid problem of sex" (PDF). Trends in Cognitive Sciences. 17 (11): 550–551. doi:10.1016/j.tics.2013.08.010. PMID 24176517. S2CID 27589924.
- Rippon, Gina; Fine, Cordelia; Jordan-Young, Rebecca; Kaiser, Anelis; Joel, Daphna (November–December 2014). "Reaction to "Equal ≠ The Same: Sex Differences in the Human Brain"". Cerebrum. 2014. Dana Foundation. Archived from the original on 16 February 2019.

See also: Cahill, Larry (March–April 2014). "Equal ≠ The Same: Sex Differences in the Human Brain". Cerebrum. 2014: 5. PMC 4087190. PMID 25009695. Archived from the original on 10 March 2019.

- Rippon, Gina; Fine, Cordelia; Jordan-Young, Rebecca; Kaiser, Anelis (28 August 2014). "Recommendations for sex/gender neuroimaging research: key principles and implications for research design, analysis and interpretation". Frontiers in Human Neuroscience. 8 (650): 650. doi:10.3389/fnhum.2014.00650. PMC 4147717. PMID 25221493.
- Rippon, Gina; Kessler, Klaus; Seymour, Robert (December 2016). "Brain oscillations and connectivity in autism spectrum disorders (ASD): new approaches to methodology, measurement and modelling" (PDF). Neuroscience & Biobehavioral Reviews. 71: 601–620. doi:10.1016/j.neubiorev.2016.10.002. PMID 27720724. S2CID 10422858.
- Rippon, Gina; Fine, Cordelia; Jordan-Young, Rebecca; Kaiser, Anelis; Joel, Daphna (July 2017). "Letter to the Editor | Journal of Neuroscience research policy on addressing sex as a biological variable: Comments, clarifications, and elaborations". Journal of Neuroscience Research. 95 (7): 1357–1359. doi:10.1002/jnr.24045. hdl:11343/292471. PMID 28225166. S2CID 45664076.

Other articles

- Rippon, Gina (December 2016). "The trouble with girls?". The Psychologist. 29 (12). British Psychological Society: 918–922. Archived from the original on 11 November 2020.
- Rippon, Gina (30 November 2015). "Greetings, Earthlings". New Scientist. 228 (3050). New Scientist Ltd.: 9. Bibcode:2015NewSc.228....9R. doi:10.1016/S0262-4079(15)31785-1. Available online here. (See also: neuroscience of sex differences.)
- Rippon, Gina; Fine, Cordelia (December 2010). "Forum: Seductive arguments?". The Psychologist. 23 (11). British Psychological Society: 948–949. Archived from the original on 5 March 2016.
  See also: Baron-Cohen, Simon (November 2010). "Delusions of gender – 'neurosexism', biology and politics (book review)". The Psychologist. 23 (11). British Psychological Society: 904–905.

- A review of: Fine, Cordelia (2010). Delusions of Gender. New York: W.W. Norton & Company. ISBN 9780393068382.

Lectures

- Rippon, Gina (18 September 2010). Sexing the brain: How Neurononsense joined Psychobabble to 'Keep Women in Their Place'. Aston University. Archived from the original on 7 January 2016.

Transcript of a lecture given at the British Science Festival, 18 September 2010.

- Dr Anna Zecharia, ScienceGrrl Director (host), Chi Onwurah, MP Newcastle upon Tyne Central (guest) and Gina Rippon (guest) (10 March 2014). WOW 2014 | Fighting The Neurotrash (Video). Southbank Centre via YouTube.

== See also ==
- Neuroscience of sex differences
- List of cognitive neuroscientists
- List of developmental psychologists
