= Giordana Grossi =

American cognitive neuroscientist

- Scientific career
- Fields: Physiological psychology (language and sex differences research)
- Institutions: SUNY New Paltz, New York
- Website: Official website

Giordana Grossi is a cognitive neuroscientist and professor of psychology at SUNY New Paltz, New York, and a member of The NeuroGenderings Network, a group which promotes "neurofeminism".

== Education ==
Giordana Grossi received her Ph.D. from the University of Pavia, Italy, and her B.A. from the University of Padova, Italy.

== Research ==
Her main areas of research are language and sex differences research, in particular the methodological and epistemological problems within sex differences research.

== Publications ==
Book chapters

- Grossi, Giordana; Fine, Cordelia (2014), "The role of fetal testosterone in the development of “the essential difference” between the sexes: Some essential issues", in Bluhm, Robyn; Japp Jacobson, Anne; Maibom, Heidi Lene, eds. (2012-01-01). Neurofeminism: issues at the intersection of feminist theory and cognitive science. Hampshire New York: Palgrave Macmillan. pp. 73–104. ISBN 9781349333929. Pdf.

Journal articles

- Grossi, Giordana; Nash, Alison (2007). "Picking Barbie™'s brain: inherent sex differences in scientific ability?". Journal of Interdisciplinary Feminist Thought. 2 (1): 5. Pdf.
- Grossi, Giordana; Savill, Nicola; Thomas, Enlli; Thierry, Guillaume (18 October 2012). "Electrophysiological cross-language neighborhood density effects in late and early English-Welsh bilinguals". Frontiers in Psychology. 3: 408. doi:10.3389/fpsyg.2012.00408. PMC 3475346. PMID 23087661.

== See also ==
- Cognitive neuroscience
- Gender essentialism
- Neuroscience of sex differences
- List of cognitive neuroscientists
- List of developmental psychologists
