= Daphna Joel =

Israeli neuroscientist

Daphna Joel דפנה יואל
- Born: January 20, 1967 (age 59)
- Known for: The concept of gender mosaic
- Scientific career
- Fields: Behavioral neuroscience, Gender studies
- Institutions: Tel-Aviv University, Israel
- Doctoral students: Yael Niv
- Website: Official website

Daphna Joel (Hebrew: דפנה יואל; born January 20, 1967) is an Israeli neuroscientist and advocate for "neurofeminism". She is best known for her research which claims that there is no such thing as a "male brain" or a "female brain". Joel's research has been criticized by other neuroscientists who argue that male and female brains, on average, show distinct differences and can be classified with a high level of accuracy. Joel is a member of The NeuroGenderings Network, an international group of researchers in gender studies and neuroscience. They are critical of what they call neurosexism in the scientific community. Joel has given lectures on her work in both scientific and lay conventions around the world.

Since 2003, Joel has served as the head of the psychobiology department at Tel Aviv University, and in 2013 was appointed chair of the PhD committee of the School of Psychological Sciences.

== Academic career ==
According to Joel, the brain is a "mosaic" of the male and female

Joel began her academic career during her compulsory military service, in the Talpiot program, which she left after a year and a half. After completing her military service, Joel enrolled in the Tel Aviv University program for outstanding students. She completed a bachelor's degree in medical science, followed by a doctorate in psychobiology (1998), which focused on how connections in the brain are organized. She then joined the faculty of neuroscience, after receiving an Alon fellowship for young Israeli scientists. Her main area of research for 15 years was the cerebral mechanisms of obsessive-compulsive disorder (OCD).

One of the main questions in Joel's research is whether there is a "male brain" and a "female brain"; whether human brains can be divided in a binary way, as is generally done with human genitals. According to Joel's research, the answer is "no".

One of the most important studies on which Joel's theory is based was done by pharmacologist Margaret McCarthy from the University of Maryland. McCarthy found that characteristics in male and female animal brains can cause changes in their shapes as a result of external circumstances such as stress. Joel concluded from the results of this study and other studies she examined that if under pressure certain areas of the brain can turn from their typical "female form" to the typical "male form" – there is no point in talking about a female brain and a male brain, and that this division is meaningless.

According to Joel, the brain has no sex, and the differences between "female" and "male" brains, though they exist, are minor and unrelated to each other. She was the first to talk about correlation in the context of the brain: a particular area of the brain, such as a large amygdala, does not predict anything about a different part of the brain, say, a small hippocampus. Although there are differences in the brain between males and females, they are not organized. Thus, if a "male" characteristic is found in a particular area, it does not actually mean anything about the masculinity or femininity of the other brain characteristics, which are determined by the complex interactions between sex, genetics and the environment.

Joel's conclusions have been challenged by others in the field of neuroscience, and she met with obstacles getting her first study on the subject published in 2011: Male or Female? Brains are Intersex.

Joel is a member of The NeuroGenderings Network and has advocated in the media for a less gender essentialist approach to neuroscience.

== Gender and feminism ==
Joel counts gender and feminism among her research interests. In an interview with The Marker, she said that even as a child and during her military service (ages 18–20) she expressed feminist views. Joel claims that in the gendered western world, males (as identified by their genitals) are channeled into being "boys", and genitally identified females – into "girls". According to Joel, the common social and cultural perception is one that divides the world of possibilities into two parts. In her opinion, in a world without gender, where there is no social and cultural significance to the shape of a person's genitals, there will be many more possibilities for both females and males.

In 2009, Joel began "Women/Men Conflict Groups" for psychology undergraduates, a program created by Prof. Ariella Friedman, according to a model developed in dialog groups of Jews and Arabs in Neve Shalom. Later, she developed a working model for groups dealing with gender issues, which combines the conflict group model with the awareness group model from the 1970s. Based on this model, she began designing a course in psychology and gender – "Is pink a girl color?", which examined social conventions such as what is "feminine" and "masculine," and people's attitudes, often unconscious, towards various things from the perspective of their gender. The preparation of this course led Joel to her research into the "male brain" and "female brain" in the early 2000s.

== Publications ==
=== Select refereed articles ===
- Joel, Daphna; Tarrasch, Ricardo; Berman, Zohar; Mukamel, Maya; Ziv, Effi (2014). "Queering gender: studying gender identity in 'normative' individuals". Psychology and Sexuality. 5 (4): 291–321. doi:10.1080/19419899.2013.830640. S2CID 4127914.
- Joel, Daphna; Yarimi, Dana (January 2014). "Consciousness-raising in a gender conflict group". International Journal of Group Psychotherapy. 64 (1): 48–69. doi:10.1521/ijgp.2014.64.1.48. PMID 24320572. S2CID 207506900.
- Joel, Daphna; Yankelevitch-Yahav, Roni (October 2014). "Reconceptualizing sex, brain and psychopathology: interaction, interaction, interaction". British Journal of Pharmacology. 171 (20): 4620–4635. doi:10.1111/bph.12732. PMC 4209935. PMID 24758640. Pdf.
- Joel, Daphna; Fine, Cordelia; Jordan-Young, Rebecca; Kaiser, Anelis; Rippon, Gina (November–December 2014). "Reaction to "Equal ≠ The Same: Sex Differences in the Human Brain"". Cerebrum. 2014. Dana Foundation. Archived from the original on 2019-02-16.
- Cahill, Larry (March–April 2014). "Equal ≠ The Same: Sex Differences in the Human Brain". Cerebrum. 2014: 5. PMC 4087190. PMID 25009695. Archived from the original on 2019-03-10.
- Joel, Daphna; Hänggi, Jürgen; Pool, Jared (5 April 2016). "Reply to Glezerman: Why differences between brains of females and brains of males do not 'add up' to create two types of brains". Proceedings of the National Academy of Sciences of the United States of America. 113 (14): E1972. Bibcode:2016PNAS..113E1972J. doi:10.1073/pnas.1600791113. PMC 4833225. PMID 26957593.
- Joel, Daphna (August 2016). "Captured in terminology: sex, sex categories, and sex". Feminism & Psychology. 26 (3): 335–345. doi:10.1177/0959353516645367. S2CID 4103598.
- Joel, Daphna; Fine, Cordelia; Jordan-Young, Rebecca; Kaiser, Anelis; Rippon, Gina (July 2017). "Letter to the Editor | Journal of Neuroscience research policy on addressing sex as a biological variable: Comments, clarifications, and elaborations". Journal of Neuroscience Research. 95 (7): 1357–1359. doi:10.1002/jnr.24045. hdl:11343/292471. PMID 28225166. S2CID 45664076.
- Joel, Daphna; Berman, Zohar; Assaf, Yaniv; Tarrasch, Ricardo (4 September 2018). "Assault-related self-blame and its association with PTSD in sexually assaulted women: an MRI inquiry". Social Cognitive and Affective Neuroscience. 13 (7): 775–784. doi:10.1093/scan/nsy044. PMC 6121153. PMID 29939345.
- Joel, Daphna; Hyde, Janet Shibley; Bigler, Rebecca S.; Tate, Charlotte Chucky; van Anders, Sari M. (2019). "The future of sex and gender in psychology: Five challenges to the gender binary". American Psychologist. 74 (2). APA via PsycNET: 171–193. doi:10.1037/amp0000307. PMID 30024214.

=== Chapters in books ===
- Joel, Daphna (2014). "Sex, gender, and brain – a problem of conceptualization". In Schmitz, Sigrid; Höppner, Grit (eds.). Gendered neurocultures: feminist and queer perspectives on current brain discourses. challenge GENDER, 2. Wien: Zaglossus. ISBN 9783902902122.
- Joel, Daphna; Stein, Dan J.; Schreiber, Rudy (2008). "Animal models of obsessive–compulsive disorder: From bench to bedside via endophenotypes and biomarkers". In McArthur, Robert A.; Borsini, Franco (eds.). Animal and translational models for CNS drug discovery. Amsterdam Boston: Elsevier/Academic Press. pp. 133–164. ISBN 9780123738561.
- Joel, Daphna; Weiner, Ina (2002). "Dopamine in schizophrenia: Dysfunctional information processing in basal ganglia-thalamocortical split circuits". In Di Chiara, Gaetano (ed.). Dopamine in the CNS II. Handbook of Experimental Pharmacology Vol. 154. Berlin New York: Springer. pp. 417–472. ISBN 9783540427209.
- Joel, Daphna; Weiner, Ina (2000). "Striatal contention scheduling and the split circuit scheme of basal ganglia-thalamocortical circuitry: From anatomy to behaviour". In Miller, Robert; Wickens, Jeffery R. (eds.). Brain dynamics and the striatal complex. Amsterdam, Netherlands: Harwood Academic. pp. 209–236. ISBN 9789057024788.

=== Non-fiction/science ===
- Joel, Daphna; Vikhanski, Luba (2019). Purple brain: beyond the myth of the male and female brain. New York: Hachette Book Group. ISBN 9780316534611.

== See also ==
- Cognitive neuroscience
- Gender essentialism
- Neuroscience of sex differences
