= Deboleena Roy =

Canadian-born behavioural scientist

- Education: Institute of Medical Science, University of Toronto
- Spouse: Sean Meighoo
- Children: Kheyal Roy-Meighoo, Koan Roy-Meighoo
- Awards: National Science Foundation Scholars Award
- Scientific career
- Fields: Neuroscience, Molecular Biology, Feminist Science and Technology Studies, Feminist Theory, Postcolonial Studies
- Workplaces: Emory University, Georgia
- Thesis: The effects of melatonin and gonadal steroids on gonadotropin-releasing hormone (GnRH) regulation in hypothalamic GT1-7 neuronal cells (2001)
- Doctoral advisor: Denise Belsham
- Website: Official website

Deboleena Roy is professor and chair of Women's, Gender, and Sexuality Studies and Neuroscience and Behavioral Biology at Emory University, former resident research fellow at the Clayman Institute for Gender Research, Stanford University (September 2008 – June 2009), and a member of The NeuroGenderings Network. Previously, she was an assistant professor at San Diego State University. Starting in August 2020, she will be serving as the Senior Associate Dean of Faculty for Emory College of Arts and Sciences.

== Education ==
Roy obtained a Bachelor of Science degree in microbiology, with a minor in South Asian studies at the University of Toronto. She then pursued a Master of Science, studying the photo sensitivity of murine fibrosarcoma cells, at McMaster University. Under the supervision of Denise Belsham, Roy completed her PhD in reproductive neuroendocrinology and molecular biology at the University of Toronto's Institute of Medical Sciences.

== Research ==
Roy's fields of interest include feminist theory, feminist science and technology studies, neuroscience, molecular biology, postcolonial theory, and reproductive justice movements, with her work having been published in a number of journals including: Signs: Journal of Women in Culture and Society, Hypatia and Neuroethics. She serves on the editorial board of Catalyst: Feminism, Theory, and Technoscience, a journal that she helped to found with her Emory colleague Elizabeth A Wilson and University of California, San Diego faculty Lisa Cartwright and David Serlin .

Roy has been cited over 700 times, and has an h-index of 11.

== Bibliography ==
=== Books ===
- Roy, D. (2014), "Developing a new political ecology: neuroscience, feminism, and the case for the estrogen receptor", in Schmitz, Sigrid; Höppner, Grit (eds.), Gendered neurocultures: feminist and queer perspectives on current brain discourses, challenge GENDER, 2, Wien: Zaglossus, pp. 203–222, ISBN 9783902902122.
- Roy, D. (2015). "Science Studies," in Handbook of Feminist Theory ed. by Lisa Disch and Mary Hawkesworth. New York: Oxford University Press. ISBN 9780199328581.
- Roy, D. Molecular Feminisms: Biology, Becomings, and Life in the Lab. University of Washington Press. (Nov 2018). Available through open access: https://uw.manifoldapp.org/projects/molecular-feminisms.

=== Selected publications ===
- Roy, D., Angelini, N.L. and Belsham, D.D. (1999). "Estrogen directly represses gonadotropin-releasing hormone (GnRH) gene expression in estrogen receptor-α (ERα)-and ERβ-expressing GT1–7 GnRH neurons." Endocrinology. 140 (11), 5045–5053.
- Roy, D., Angelini, N.L., Fujieda, H. Brown, G.M. and Belsham, D.D. (2001). "Cyclical regulation of GnRH gene expression in GT1–7 GnRH-secreting neurons by melatonin." Endocrinology. (11), 4711–4720.
- Roy, D. and Belsham, D.D. (2002). "Melatonin Receptor Activation Regulates GnRH Gene Expression and Secretion in GT1–7 GnRH Neurons." Journal of Biological Chemistry. 277 (1), 251–258.
- Roy, D. (2007). "Somatic matters: Becoming molecular in molecular biology. " Rhizomes: Cultural Studies in Emerging Knowledge. 14.
- Roy, D. (2012). "Neuroethics, Gender, and the Response to Difference." Neuroethics 5: 217–230.
- Roy, D. (2016). "Neuroscience and Feminist Theory: A New Directions Essay." Signs. 41(3): 531–552.
