= Neurosexism =

Alleged bias in neuroscience

Neurosexism is an alleged bias in the neuroscience of sex differences towards reinforcing harmful gender stereotypes. The term was coined by feminist scholar Cordelia Fine in a 2008 article and popularised by her 2010 book Delusions of Gender. The concept is now widely used by critics of the neuroscience of sex differences in neuroscience, neuroethics and philosophy.

== Definition ==
Neuroscientist Gina Rippon defines neurosexism as follows: "'Neurosexism' is the practice of claiming that there are fixed differences between female and male brains, which can explain women's inferiority or unsuitability for certain roles." For example, "this includes things such as men being more logical and women being better at languages or nurturing."

Fine and Rippon, along with Daphna Joel, state that "the point of critical enquiry is not to deny differences between the sexes, but to ensure a full understanding of the findings and meaning of any particular report." Many of the issues they discuss to support their position are "serious issues for all areas of behavioral research", but they argue that "in sex/gender differences research... they are often particularly acute." Nonetheless, the common factor influencing logical maturity between males and females is the maturity of the frontal cortex, which matures at the age of 25, at the earliest. The topic of neurosexism is thus closely tied to wider debates about scientific methodology, especially in the behavioral sciences.

== History ==
The history of science contains many examples of scientists and philosophers drawing conclusions about the mental inferiority of women, or their lack of aptitude for certain tasks, on the basis of alleged anatomical differences between male and female brains. In the late 19th century, George J. Romanes used the difference in average brain weight between men and women to explain the "marked inferiority of intellectual power" of the latter. Absent a sexist background assumption about male superiority, there would be nothing to explain here.

Despite these historical pseudo-scientific studies, Becker et al. argue that "for decades" the scientific community has abstained from studying sex-differences. Larry Cahill asserts that today there is a widely held belief in the scientific community that sex-differences do not matter to large parts of biology and neuroscience, apart from explaining reproduction and the workings of reproduction hormones.

Although overtly sexist statements may no longer have a place within the scientific community, Cordelia Fine, Gina Rippon and Daphna Joel contend that similar patterns of reasoning still exist. They claim that many researchers who make claims about gendered brain differences fail to provide sufficient warrant for their position. Philosophers of science who believe in a value-free normative standard for science find the practice of neurosexism particularly problematic. They hold that science should be free from values and biases, and argue that only epistemic values have a legitimate role to play in scientific inquiry. However, contrary to the value-free ideal view, Heather Douglas argues that 'value-free science is inadequate science'

== Examples in science ==
=== Prenatal hormone theory ===
Contemporary research continues in a more subtle vein through Prenatal Hormone Theory. According to the Prenatal Hormone Theory, "male and female foetuses differ in testosterone concentrations beginning as early as week 8 of gestation [and] the early hormone difference exerts permanent influences on brain development and behaviour." Charges of neurosexism may then be moved against the PHT if these alleged hormonal differences are interpreted as causing the male/female brain distinction and in turn are used to reinforce stereotypical behaviours and gender roles.

=== Empathising–systemising theory ===
The notion that there are hard-wired differences between male and female brains is particularly explicit in Simon Baron-Cohen's empathising-systematising (E-S) theory. Empathy is defined as the drive to identify and respond appropriately to emotions and thoughts in others, and systematising is defined as the drive to analyse and explore a system, isolate the underlying rules that govern the behaviour of that system, and build new systems. These two characteristics can be seen amongst young girls and boys. Girls have a tendency to play with baby dolls when they are young, enacting their social and emotional skills. Boys tend to play with plastic cars, illustrating a more mechanical, system-driven mind. This may be of course due simply to the environment and to social norms. However, the empathising-systematising theory posits three broad brain types, or organisation structures: type E, the empathiser; type S, the systematiser; type B, the 'balanced brain'. Given that females are twice as likely to display brain type E, and males are twice as likely to display brain type S, he labels these brain 'types' the 'female brain' and the 'male brain', respectively. This type of analysis suggests therefore that most (or at least some) differences in skills and occupation between males and females can be explained by virtue of them having different brain structures.

Baron Cohen's theory has been criticised because it presents a clear-cut dichotomy between male and female brains, whilst this is not necessarily the case: there are females with 'male brains', and males with 'female brains'. Using the gendered labels makes it significantly more likely that evidence of gendered brain differences will be over-stated in the media, in way that might actively shape the gender norms within society.

=== Neuroimaging ===
In Delusions of Gender, Cordelia Fine criticises work by Ruben and Raquel Gur and collaborators. In the context of explaining the under-representation of women in science and mathematics, she quotes them as claiming that "the greater facility of women with interhemispheric communications may attract them to disciplines that require integration rather than detailed scrutiny of narrowly characterized processes." This contention is however corroborated by a 2014 study about the structural connectome. The study used 949 youths to establish novel sex differences, establishing the key difference that male brains are optimised for intrahemispheric communication, while female brains are optimised for interhemispheric communication. Furthermore, the development timeframe of male and female brain are vastly different. However, this study used youths from age 8 to 22, where the brain is still developing so the results may not be conclusive enough.

In a 1999 study, Gur et al. found a link between the amount of white matter in a person's brain and their performance on spatial tasks. Fine points out that the sample size of ten people is a small sample size, and the researchers tested for thirty-six different relationships in this sample. Fine argues that results like these should be treated with caution, because, given the sample size and the number of relationships tested, the correlation found between white matter volume and performance in the tasks could be a false positive. Fine accuses the researchers of downplaying the risk of a false positive after conducting many statistical analyses of past research projects, she argues that using their results as the basis of an explanation for why women are under-represented in scientific fields is inadequate here.

Fine also discusses a 2004 neuroimaging study by neuroscientist Sandra Witelson and collaborators. This study was taken to support sex differences in emotional processing by Allan and Barbara Pease in their book Why Men Don't Listen and Women Can't Read Maps and by Susan Pinker in her book The Sexual Paradox. Fine argues that, with a sample size of just 16, the results could easily have been false positives. She compares the study to a famous 2009 study in which, to illustrate the risk of false positives in neuroimaging research, researchers showed increased brain activity in a dead salmon during a perspective-taking task.

=== Dispute between Fine and Baron-Cohen ===
A notable dispute in 2010 between Fine and neuroscientist Simon Baron-Cohen in The Psychologist magazine centred on a study into sex differences in the responses of newborn babies to human faces and mechanical mobiles. The research took babies under 24 hours old and showed them a human face, or a mechanical mobile. If they were shown the human face first, they were then shown the mechanical mobile and vice versa. The babies responses were recorded, and judges coded the eye movements of the babies to discern which, if either, of the stimuli the babies looked at for longer. The study concluded that female babies looked at human faces for longer, and male babies looked at mechanical mobiles for longer. Therefore, this study concluded that female brains are programmed towards empathy whereas male brains are more inclined towards practicality and building systems. This theory suggested that an individual can be characterised into having a certain "brain type" where empathising was called the brain type E, and systemising was called the brain type S. However, some individuals can be equally strong at empathising and systemising and therefore, they possess a "balanced brain". This has the brain type B.

Fine criticised the study, arguing that because the babies were shown one stimulus first and then the other, they may have become fatigued, affecting the results of the study. Furthermore, Fine also argued that the panel of judges watching the babies' eye movements may have been able to guess the sex of the baby, for example if the baby was dressed in certain clothing or had particular congratulatory cards present, giving rise to confirmation type biases. Baron-Cohen has countered these criticisms. Baron-Cohen replied to the fatigue argument by explaining that the stimuli were shown in randomised order, so as to avoid the problem of specific stimuli fatigue in either sex. In response to the claim about bias, he argued that the judges were only able to assess the babies' eye movements by watching a video of the eye area of the baby, through which it would have been almost impossible to derive the sex of the baby. Notwithstanding this, Fine argued that the effort to conceal the babies' sex from the experimenters in the room with the babies was "minimal", allowing room for implicit bias, rendering the results unreliable.

=== Congenital adrenal hyperplasia ===
Rebecca Jordan-Young provides a good case study of neurosexism in studies of those with congenital adrenal hyperplasia (CAH). Because Prenatal Hormone Theory posits early steroid hormones during fetal development as conducive to sex-typical behaviours, studies of genetic females with CAH are important to test the feasibility of this hypothesis.

Jordan-Young conducts a comprehensive review of these studies, finding them to neglect four broad categories of variables that plausibly affect psychosexual development: "(1) physiological effects of CAH, including complex disruption of steroid hormones from early development onwards; (2) intensive medical intervention and surveillance, which many women with CAH describe as traumatic; (3) direct effects of genital morphology on sexuality; and (4) expectations of masculinisation that likely affect both the development and evaluation of gender and sexuality in CAH."

Complex and continuous interactions between biological factors, medical intervention, and social pressures suggest a more holistic explanation for atypicalities in the psychological make up and behaviour of those with CAH than the conventional explanation that prenatal hormones "masculinise" the brain. Neglecting these four categories in our methodology of studies into those with CAH then favours the sex difference hypothesis, providing a clear example of neurosexism in scientific research.

However, studies of CAH fail to account for unusual childhood experiences, parental expectations or reporting bias.

== Examples in scientific communication ==
The media reporting of the neuroscience of sex differences has also attracted criticism. A high-profile example was the reporting of a 2014 neuroimaging study on sex differences the structural connectome of the human brain. The study used diffusion tensor imaging to investigate white matter connections in the brains of 949 participants ranging from 8 to 22 years old. The authors claimed to have discovered "fundamental sex differences in the structural architecture of the human brain". The study was widely reported by media organizations around the world. A content analysis of the media coverage investigated the claims made in the original scientific article and in several different types of media reporting. The analysis showed that information from the scientific article was given "increasingly diversified, personalized, and politicized meaning" in media outlets and was widely seen to have vindicated traditional gender stereotypes, even though the neuroimaging technique used could only detect structural differences, not functional differences, between the sexes.

=== The changing media environment ===
The way scientific information is passed from the scientific community into the public consciousness has changed with the development of technology, social media, and news platforms. The traditional route from study, to media, to public consciousness no longer permits. The advent of the "blogosphere" and other forms of social media mean that audiences now actively produce and critique scientific alongside other scientists, whether or not this is a benefit or hindrance to the scientific community is yet to be realised given the infancy of these channels. We should, however, remain alert to the problems arising from greater public involvement in our scientific communication, particularly for the understanding of findings.

Cliodhna O'Connor and Helene Joffe examine how traditional media, blogs, and their comment sections autonomously project prevailing understanding of sex differences (emotion-rationality dualism and traditional role divisions) onto mute findings, construing men as purely rational and women as highly emotional, noting how both social representation theory and system justification theory may be causing bias in the interpretation of these findings. The findings of their study showed significant scope for parties to apply their own personal and cultural agendas onto the findings, and share these through blogs and comments. In projecting prevailing stereotypes on the mute findings, we have a prime example of how neurosexism can arrive in stages outside the domain of science, raising further concerns for the feminist camp for whilst we can apply the necessary checks and balances in the method of our science, once the information is in the public consciousness they can manipulate and construe research however they see fit.

=== Communication and neurological discoveries ===
The interest and coverage generated by neurological studies on sex differences is an instance of a wider phenomenon. It is possible to see the 'neuro-' prefix being widely used: "neuromarketing", "neuroeconomics", "neurodrinks". One study documented in the Journal of Cognitive Neuroscience tested the hypothesis that irrelevant neuroscience explanations accompanying descriptions of psychological phenomena causes people to rate the descriptions as better quality. Results showed that irrelevant neuroscience information does indeed cause people to rate explanations more satisfying than without, even in cases where neuroscience was not useful to explain the phenomenon.

== Methodological issues ==
According to Cordelia Fine and Gina Rippon, there are systematic methodological issues in the neuroscience of sex differences that increase the chances of neurosexism. In other words, questions of neurosexism are not entirely independent of questions about scientific methodology.

=== Reverse inferences ===
A reverse inference infers that activation in a particular brain region causes the presence of a mental process. Fine argues that such inferences are routine in the neuroscience of sex differences, yet "the absence of neat one-to-one mapping between brain regions and mental processes renders reverse inferences logically invalid". She emphasises that mental processes arise from complex interactions between a multiplicity of brain regions; the inference from correlation to causation is invalid, because the interactions between brain regions and mental processes are vastly complex. The invalidity stems from brain region activation being multiply realisable. For example, the mental processes of experiencing visual art and experiencing the taste of food both activate the nucleus accumbens; activation of the nucleus accumbens then doesn't necessarily cause the mental process of tasting food, since activation could be causing another mental process (e.g. experiencing visual art).

=== Plasticity ===
Plasticity refers to the brain's ability to change as a result of experiences in one's life. Because of the brain's plasticity, it is possible in principle for social phenomena related to gender to influence the organization of a person's brain. Fine has argued that the neuroscience of sex differences does not do enough to take plasticity into account. In Fine's view, neuroscientists tend to take a snap-shot comparison (looking at current neural differences) and describe the results as "hard-wired", without considering that the observed patterns could change over time.

To examine one possible example of this, consider the 2014 Ingalhalikar et al. study, which used diffusion tensor imaging to find relatively greater within-hemisphere neural connectivity in males' brains, and relatively greater across-hemisphere connectivity in females' brains. This was then employed to naturalise sex-specific cognitive differences, which then naturalised their suitability for divergent skill-sets. However, given the aforementioned concept of brain plasticity, the notion that these connectivity differences are exclusively a result of natural biology can be challenged. This is because plasticity introduces the alternative possibility that individuals' sex-specific learned behaviours could have also impacted their brain connectome. Thus, the concept of brain plasticity raises the question of whether the observed brain differences from the study are caused by nature or nurture.

=== Sample sizes ===
Fine has criticised the small sample sizes that are typical of Functional Neuroimaging (FNI) studies reporting sex differences in the brain. She supports this claim with a meta-analysis. She takes a sample of thirty-nine studies from Medline, Web of Science, and PsycINFO databases, published between 2009 and 2010, in which sex differences were referred to in the article title. Fine reports that over the entire sample, the mean number of males was 19, and the mean number of females was 18.5. Disregarding the studies making sex-by-age and sex-by-group comparisons (which require larger sample sizes), the average sample sizes were even smaller, with a mean of 13.5 males, and a mean of 13.8 females. She also points out that the second largest study in the group reported a null finding.

Small sample sizes are problematic because they increase the risk of False positives. Not only do false positives misinform, but they also "tend to persist because failures to replicate are inconclusive and unappealing both to attempt by researchers and to publish by journals".

== Criticism ==
Simon Baron-Cohen has defended the neuroscience of sex differences against the charge of neurosexism. In a review of Delusions of Gender, he said that "Ultimately, for me, the biggest weakness of Fine's neurosexism allegation is the mistaken blurring of science with politics", saying that "You can be a scientist interested in the nature of sex differences while being a clear supporter of equal opportunities and a firm opponent of all forms of discrimination in society."

== See also ==
- Cissexism
- Cisnormativity
- Heterosexism
- Monosexism
- Allonormativity
- Intersexism
- Transmedicalism
