= Robyn Bluhm =

Philosopher

- Born: 1969 (age 56–57)

Education
- Education: University of Western Ontario
- Thesis: The hierarchy of evidence and the structure of medical research: implications for evidence-based medicine (2005)

Philosophical work
- Main interests: The use of functional neuroimaging in psychiatry
- Website: Official website

Robyn Bluhm (born 1969), is associate professor at the Department of Philosophy and Lyman Briggs College, Michigan State University, as well as a member of The NeuroGenderings Network – a group which promotes "neurofeminism". She is the current joint editor of the IJFAB: International Journal of Feminist Approaches to Bioethics

== Research ==
Bluhm's research interests include the philosophy of evidence-based practice and the use of functional neuroimaging in psychiatry.

== Books ==
- Bluhm, Robyn; Maibom, Heidi Lene; Jaap Jacobson, Anne (2012). Neurofeminism: issues at the intersection of feminist theory and cognitive science. New York: Palgrave Macmillan. doi:10.1057/9780230368385. ISBN 9780230296732.
- Bluhm, Robyn (2017). Knowing and acting in medicine. London Lanham, Maryland: Rowman & Littlefield International Ltd. ISBN 9781783488100.

== See also ==
- Cognitive neuroscience
- Gender essentialism
- Neuroscience of sex differences
- List of cognitive neuroscientists
