= Isabelle Dussauge =

Swedish technology researcher

- Education: KTH Royal Institute of Technology
- Known for: Co-founder of The NeuroGenderings Network
- Scientific career
- Fields: Science, technology and society (STS)
- Workplaces: Department of History of Science and Ideas, Uppsala University
- Thesis: Technomedical Visions: Magnetic Resonance Imaging in 1980s Sweden (2008)
- Website: Official website

Isabelle Dussauge is a science, technology and society (STS) researcher at the Department of History of Science and Ideas, Uppsala University, Sweden and former assistant professor at the Department of Thematic Studies (technology and social change), Linköping University, Sweden. She is also the co-founder, with Anelis Kaiser, of The NeuroGenderings Network, and acted as guest editor, again with Kaiser on the journal Neuroethics.

== Education ==
Dussauge gained her doctorate in the history of technology from the KTH Royal Institute of Technology in 2008.

== Research ==
Dussauge's areas of research include: technomedical visions, computerization and health care, brain desires feminism and science, and values.

== Books ==
- Dussauge, Isabelle; Berner, Boel (2014). Kön, kropp, materialitet: perspektiv från fransk genusforskning [Gender, body, materiality: perspectives from French research] (in Swedish). Lund, Sweden: Arkiv. ISBN 9789179242619.
- Dussauge, Isabelle; Helgesson, Claes-Fredrik; Lee, Francis (2015). Value practices in the life sciences and medicine. Oxford, United Kingdom: Oxford University Press. ISBN 9780199689583.
