= Biological essentialism =

Biological essentialism may refer to:

- Biological determinism, the belief that human behavior is biologically predetermined
- Gender essentialism, the belief that human genders are biologically innate
- Biological essentialism, the belief that species are unchanging throughout time
