= Rebecca Jordan-Young =

American sociomedical scientist

- Born: Rebecca M. Jordan-Young; 1963 (age 62–63)
- Education: Columbia University
- Known for: Author of Brain Storm: The Flaws in the Science of Sex Differences
- Awards: Guggenheim Fellowship (2016)
- Scientific career
- Fields: Sex, gender and sexuality
- Workplaces: Barnard College

Rebecca M. Jordan-Young (born 1963), is an American feminist scientist and gender studies scholar. Her research focuses on social medical science, sex, gender, sexuality, and epidemiology. She is the Ann Whitney Olin Professor of Women's, Gender, and Sexuality Studies at Barnard College.

== Life and career ==
Jordan-Young completed her undergraduate work at Bryn Mawr College, receiving her bachelor's degree in political science. She earned her master's degree and Ph.D. from Columbia University.

Jordan-Young was a principal investigator and deputy director of the Social Theory Core at the Center for Drug Use and HIV Research of the National Development and Research Institutes. She has served as a health disparities scholar sponsored by the National Institutes of Health. In 2008, Jordan-Young was a visiting scholar in cognitive neuroscience at the International School for Advanced Studies.

She is the author of Brain Storm: The Flaws in the Science of Sex Differences, a critical analysis of scientific research supporting the theory that psychological sex differences in humans are "hard-wired" into the brain. Jordan-Young argues that studies of "human brain organization theory," fail to meet scientific standards.

In Out of Bounds? A Critique of the New Policies on Hyperandrogenism in Elite Female Athletes, a collaborative article with Katrina Karkazis, Georgiann Davis, and Silvia Camporesi, published in 2012 in the American Journal of Bioethics, the authors argue that a new sex testing policy by the International Association of Athletics Federations aimed at intersex women athletes will not protect against breaches of privacy, will require athletes to undergo unnecessary treatment in order to compete, and will intensify "gender policing". They recommend that athletes be able to compete in accordance with their legal gender.

In 2016, Jordan-Young was awarded a Guggenheim Fellowship to work on a book on testosterone, "T: The Unauthorized Biography", with co-author Katrina Karkazis.

== Selected bibliography ==
=== Books ===
- Brain Storm: The Flaws in the Science of Sex Differences. Harvard University Press. 2011. ISBN 978-0-674-06351-8.
- Jordan-Young, Rebecca; Karkazis, Katrina (2019). Testosterone: An Unauthorized Biography. Harvard University Press. ISBN 978-0-674-72532-4.

=== Journals ===
- Karkazis, Katrina; Jordan-Young, Rebecca (April 2018). "The Powers of Testosterone: Obscuring Race and Regional Bias in the Regulation of Women Athletes". Feminist Formations. 30 (2): 1–39. doi:10.1353/ff.2018.0017. S2CID 149739328.
- Jordan-Young, Rebecca; Fine, Cordelia; Rippon, Gina; Kaiser, Anelis; Joel, Daphna (July 2017). "Letter to the Editor | Journal of Neuroscience research policy on addressing sex as a biological variable: Comments, clarifications, and elaborations". Journal of Neuroscience Research. 95 (7). Wiley: 1357–1359. doi:10.1002/jnr.24045. hdl:11343/292471. PMID 28225166. S2CID 45664076.
- Jordan-Young, Rebecca; Karkazis, Katrina (22 May 2015). "Debating a testosterone "sex gap"". Science. 348 (6237). American Association for the Advancement of Science: 858–886. Bibcode:2015Sci...348..858K. doi:10.1126/science.aab1057. PMID 25999490.
- Jordan-Young, Rebecca; Rippon, Gina; Fine, Cordelia; Kaiser, Anelis; Joel, Daphna (November–December 2014). "Reaction to "Equal ≠ The Same: Sex Differences in the Human Brain"". Cerebrum. 2014. Dana Foundation. Archived from the original on 2019-02-16.

See also: Cahill, Larry (March–April 2014). "Equal ≠ The Same: Sex Differences in the Human Brain". Cerebrum. 2014. Dana Foundation: 5. PMC 4087190. PMID 25009695. Archived from the original on 2019-03-10.

- Jordan-Young, Rebecca; Fine, Cordelia; Rippon, Gina; Kaiser, Anelis (28 August 2014). "Recommendations for sex/gender neuroimaging research: key principles and implications for research design, analysis and interpretation". Frontiers in Human Neuroscience. 8. Frontiers: 650. doi:10.3389/fnhum.2014.00650. PMC 4147717. PMID 25221493.
- Jordan-Young, Rebecca; Sonksen, Peter H.; Karkazis, Katrina (28 April 2014). "Sex, health, and athletes". BMJ. 348 (248) g2926. BMA. doi:10.1136/bmj.g2926. PMID 24776640. S2CID 2198650.
- Jordan-Young, Rebecca; Fine, Cordelia; Rippon, Gina; Kaiser, Anelis (November 2013). "Plasticity, plasticity, plasticity…and the rigid problem of sex" (PDF). Trends in Cognitive Sciences. 17 (11). Elsevier: 550–551. doi:10.1016/j.tics.2013.08.010. PMID 24176517. S2CID 27589924.
- Jordan-Young, Rebecca; Rumiati, Raffaella I. (December 2012). "Hardwired for sexism? Approaches to sex/gender in neuroscience". Neuroethics. 5 (3). Springer: 305–315. doi:10.1007/s12152-011-9134-4. S2CID 143860351.
- Jordan-Young, Rebecca; Karkazis, Katrina; Davis, Georgiann; Camporesi, Silvia (July 2012). "Out of Bounds? A Critique of the New Policies on Hyperandrogenism in Elite Female Athletes". American Journal of Bioethics. 12 (7): 3–16. doi:10.1080/15265161.2012.680533. PMC 5152729. PMID 22694023.
- Jordan-Young, Rebecca (June 2012). "Hormones, context, and "Brain Gender": A review of evidence from congenital adrenal hyperplasia". Social Science & Medicine. 74 (11): 1738–1744. doi:10.1016/j.socscimed.2011.08.026. PMID 21962724.

=== Editorials ===
- Karkazis, Katrina; Jordan-Young, Rebecca (April 26, 2018). "The testosterone rule targets global south athletes like Caster Semenya". The Guardian.
- Karkazis, Katrina; Jordan-Young, Rebecca (April 2014). "The Trouble With Too Much T". The New York Times.
- Karkazis, Katrina; Jordan-Young, Rebecca (June 2012). "You Say You're a Woman? That Should Be Enough". The New York Times.
