= List of cognitive neuroscientists =

Below are some notable researchers in cognitive neuroscience listed by topic of interest.

Language

- Steven Pinker
- Elizabeth Bates
- Brian MacWhinney
- Thomas Bever
- Marta Kutas
- Laura-Ann Petitto
- Morton Gernsbacher
- Angela D. Friederici
- Giordana Grossi

Memory

- Brenda Milner
- Daniel Schacter
- Endel Tulving
- Nancy Kanwisher
- James McGaugh
- Alexander Luria
- Morris Moscovitch
- Larry Squire

Vision

- David Marr
- Stephen Kosslyn
- Roger Shepard
- Brian Wandell
- Jerome Lettvin
- David Hubel
- Torsten Wiesel
- Leslie Ungerleider

Learning and Connectionism

- Joshua Vogelstein
- Cornelia Bargmann
- David Rumelhart
- James McClelland
- Jeffrey Elman
- Eric Kandel
- Annette Karmiloff-Smith
- Yuko Munakata
- Mark Johnson
- Donald O. Hebb
- Gina Rippon
- Daphna Joel

Laterality

- Roger Wolcott Sperry
- Michael Gazzaniga
- Wilder Penfield
- Stephen Kosslyn
- Elkhonon Goldberg
- Norman Geschwind

Emotion

- John Cacioppo
- C. Sue Carter
- António Damásio
- Richard Davidson
- Jean Decety
- Joseph E. LeDoux
- Jaak Panksepp
- Stephen Porges
- Robyn Bluhm

Other/Misc. Categories

- Brian Butterworth
- Gail Carpenter
- Stanislas Dehaene
- Stephen Grossberg
- Sam Harris
- Daniel Levitin
- Edvard Moser
- May-Britt Moser
- John O'Keefe (neuroscientist)
- George Ojemann
- Isabelle Peretz
- Michael Posner
- Vilayanur S. Ramachandran

== See also ==
- List of cognitive scientists
- List of neuroscientists
- List of psychologists
