= Transmedicalism =

Belief that being transgender is a medical issue characterized by gender dysphoria

Transmedicalism is the belief that only those diagnosed with gender dysphoria are transgender and medical transition (i.e., hormone therapy or sex reassignment surgery) should be restricted based on this criterion. Transmedicalists (or transmeds) believe trans people who do not experience dysphoria or desire medical assistance are not authentically transgender, and some label them transtrenders. They may also exclude non-binary people. There are divides and debates among transmedicalists on the exact definition of who counts as transgender.

Transmedicalists are sometimes referred to as truscum, a term coined on Tumblr meaning "true transsexual scum" which they have since reappropriated. Those who believe that gender dysphoria is not required to be transgender are sometimes called tucute, meaning "too cute to be cisgender". Both transtrender and truscum are sometimes seen as derogatory terms.

Some critics view transmedicalism akin to the medical model of disability in that it medicalizes an attribute that contains both medical and social components.

== See also ==
- Causes of gender incongruence
- Gender essentialism
- Medicalisation of sexuality
- Neurosexism
- Psychic determinism
- Social construction of gender
- Respectability politics
- The Transsexual Phenomenon
