= Neuroscience and sexual orientation =

Mechanisms of sexual orientation development in humans

Sexual orientation is an enduring pattern of romantic or sexual attraction (or a combination of these) to persons of the opposite sex or gender, the same sex or gender, or to both sexes or more than one gender, or none of the aforementioned at all. The ultimate causes and mechanisms of sexual orientation development in humans remain unclear and many theories are speculative and controversial. However, advances in neuroscience explain and illustrate characteristics linked to sexual orientation. Studies have explored structural neural-correlates, functional and/or cognitive relationships, and developmental theories relating to sexual orientation in humans.

== Developmental neurobiology ==
Many theories concerning the development of sexual orientation involve fetal neural development, with proposed models illustrating prenatal hormone exposure, maternal immunity, and developmental instability. Other proposed factors include genetic control of sexual orientation. No conclusive evidence has been shown that environmental or learned effects are responsible for the development of non-heterosexual orientation.

As of 2005, sexual dimorphisms in the brain and behavior among vertebrates were accounted for by the influence of gonadal steroidal androgens as demonstrated in animal models over the prior few decades. The prenatal androgen model of homosexuality describes the neuro-developmental effects of fetal exposure to these hormones. In 1985, Geschwind and Galaburda proposed that homosexual men are exposed to high androgen levels early in development and proposed that temporal and local variations in androgen exposure to a fetus's developing brain is a factor in the pathways determining homosexuality. This led scientists to look for somatic markers for prenatal hormonal exposure that could be easily, and non-invasively, explored in otherwise endocrinologically normal populations. Various somatic markers (including 2D:4D finger ratios, auditory evoked potentials, fingerprint patterns and eye-blink patterns) have since been found to show variation based on sexual orientation in healthy adult individuals.

Other evidence supporting the role of testosterone and prenatal hormones in sexual orientation development include observations of male subjects with cloacal exstrophy who were sex-assigned as female during birth only later to declare themselves male. This supports the theory that the prenatal testosterone surge is crucial for gender identity development. Additionally, females whose mothers were exposed to diethylstilbestrol (DES) during pregnancy show higher rates of bi- and homosexuality.

Variations in the hypothalamus may have some influence on sexual orientation. Studies show that factors such as cell number and size of various nuclei in the hypothalamus may impact one's sexual orientation.

== Brain structure ==
There are multiple areas of the brain which have been found to display differences based on sexual orientation. Several of these can be found in the hypothalamus, including the sexually dimorphic nucleus of the preoptic area (SDN-POA) present in several mammalian species. Researchers have shown that the SDN-POA aides in sex-dimorphic mating behavior in some mammals, which is representative of human sexual orientation. The human equivalent to the SDN-POA is the interstitial nucleus of the anterior hypothalamus, which is also sexually dimorphic and has demonstrated dissimilar sizes between sexualities. There are also other POA-like brain structures in the human brain which differ between sexual orientations, such as the suprachiasmatic nucleus and the anterior hypothalamus. Using meta-analysis of neuroimaging, researchers have concluded that these areas are linked to sexual preferences in humans, which would explain why they may differ based on sexual orientation.

Another area of the brain which demonstrates sexual orientation differentiation is the thalamus, which is a structure involved in sexual arousal and reward. The thalamus of heterosexual individuals was found to be bigger than that of homosexual individuals. The placement of connections in the amygdala have been demonstrated to differ between heterosexual and homosexual individuals. The posterior cingulate cortex, a part of the occipital lobe, the region of the brain that processes visual information, has also been demonstrated to have differences based on sexual orientation.

Research has shown that a couple of the areas of connection between the hemispheres of the brain have differences in their size depending on sexual orientation. The front commission was found to be wider in homosexual men than heterosexual men, and the corpus callosum was found to be larger in homosexual men than heterosexual men.

Some areas of the brain which researchers looked at but did not find differences in structure between sexualities are the temporal cortex, hippocampus and putamen.

== Fraternal birth order effect ==
Neuroscience has been implicated in the study of birth order and male sexual orientation. A significant volume of research has found that the more older brothers a man has from the same mother, the greater the probability he will have a homosexual orientation. Estimates indicate that there is a 33-48% increase in chances of homosexuality in a male child with each older brother, and the effect is not observed in those with older adoptive or step-brothers, indicative of a prenatal biological mechanism. Ray Blanchard and Anthony Bogaert discovered the association in the 1990s, and named it the fraternal birth order (FBO) effect. The mechanism by which the effect is believed to operate states that a mother develops an immune response against a substance important in male fetal development during pregnancy, and that this immune effect becomes increasingly likely with each male fetus gestated by the mother. This immune effect is thought to cause an alteration in (some) later born males' prenatal brain development. The target of the immune response are molecules (specifically Y-linked proteins, which are thought to play a role in fetal brain sex-differentiation) on the surface of male fetal brain cells, including in sites of the anterior hypothalamus (which has been linked to sexual orientation in other research). Antibodies produced during the immune response are thought to cross the placental barrier and enter the fetal compartment where they bind to the Y-linked molecules and thus alter their role in sexual differentiation, leading some males to be attracted to men as opposed to women. Biochemical evidence to support this hypothesis was identified in 2017, finding mothers of gay sons, particularly those with older brothers, had significantly higher anti-NLGN4Y levels than other samples of women, including mothers of heterosexual sons.

The effect does not mean that all or most sons will be gay after several male pregnancies, but rather, the odds of having a gay son increase from approximately 2% for the firstborn son, to 4% for the second, 6% for the third and so on. Scientists have estimated that 15-29% of gay men owe their sexual orientation to this effect, but the number may be higher, as prior miscarriages and terminations of male pregnancies may have exposed their mothers to Y-linked antigens. In addition, the effect is nullified in left-handed men. As it is contingent on handedness and handedness is a prenatally determined trait, it further attributes the effect to be biological, rather than psychosocial. The fraternal birth order effect does not apply to the development of female homosexuality. Blanchard does not believe the same antibody response would cause homosexuality in firstborn gay sons – instead, they may owe their orientation to genes, prenatal hormones and other maternal immune responses which also influence fetal brain development.

The few studies which have not observed a correlation between gay men and birth order have generally been criticized for methodological errors and sampling methods. J. Michael Bailey has said that no plausible hypothesis other than a maternal immune response has been identified.

== Research directions ==
As of 2005, research directions included:

- finding markers for sex steroid levels in the brains of fetuses that highlight features of early neuro-development leading to certain sexual orientations
- determine the precise neural circuitry underlying direction of sexual preference
- use animal models to explore genetic and developmental factors that influence sexual orientation
- further population studies, genetic studies, and serological markers to clarify and definitively determine the effect of maternal immunity
- neuroimaging studies to quantify sexual-orientation-related differences in structure and function in vivo
- neurochemical studies to investigate the roles of sex steroids upon neural circuitry involved in sexual attraction

=== Karolinska Institutet study (2021) ===
A large-scale MRI brain imaging study by researchers at Karolinska Institutet, analysing data from over 18,000 individuals in the UK Biobank, found that brain structures of non-heterosexual men and women were shifted toward those of the opposite sex: a so-called cross-sex shift. These differences occurred primarily in areas involved in the processing of sensory and visual information. The researchers also found that a polygenic score for same-sex sexual behaviour correlated with brain structure, suggesting a genetic component to the observed differences. The study found no evidence for a neurobiological link between same-sex sexual behaviour and psychiatric disorders.

=== History of neuroscience research on sexual orientation ===
A 2024 historical review published in Frontiers in Human Neuroscience traced neuroscientific research on sexual and gender diversity from its first identified publication in 1917. The review identified that prior to 1973, research largely focused on pathological associations between sexual diversity and psychopathology. The 1990s marked a peak in scientific output and a shift toward non-pathologising frameworks. The review concluded that research in the 2000s moved increasingly toward documenting the negative health impacts of stigmatisation of LGBTQIA+ people, rather than seeking biological "causes" of homosexuality. The authors also noted a significant lack of studies on lesbian, bisexual, and intersex people within the neuroscience literature.

=== Neurocognitive differences ===
A meta-analysis of 106 samples totalling 254,231 participants found that homosexual men performed similarly to heterosexual women on both male-favouring tests (e.g. spatial cognition) and female-favouring tests (e.g. verbal fluency), while homosexual women performed similarly to heterosexual men only on male-favouring tests. The magnitude of differences was largest for spatial abilities and in studies comparing exclusive heterosexuals with exclusive homosexuals.

=== Multifactorial synthesis (2025) ===
A 2025 review synthesised biological, genetic, neurological, and environmental research on homosexuality, concluding that it is "an intricate and multifactorial phenomenon affected by the interaction of biological, genetic, neurological and environmental factors," with no single causal explanation sufficient to explain variation in sexual orientation.

== See also ==
- Biology and sexual orientation
- Neuroanatomy of intimacy
- Neuroscience of sex differences
- Heterosexuality
- Homosexuality and psychology
