= Glyn W. Humphreys =

British cognitive neuropsychologist

- Born: 24 December 1954; Ormskirk, Lancashire
- Died: 14 January 2016 (aged 61)
- Education: Merchant Taylors' Boys' School, Crosby; University of Bristol
- Scientific career
- Fields: Cognitive neuropsychology
- Workplaces: Oxford University

Glyn W. Humphreys (28 December 1954 – 14 January 2016) was a British cognitive neuropsychologist and academic. He was the Watts Professor of Experimental Psychology and principal investigator for the CNN Lab at Oxford University. He had previously worked at the University of Birmingham in the School of Psychology, where he held an honorary professorship of Cognitive Psychology. He died on 14 January 2016.

== Early life ==
Glyn Humphreys was born on 28 December 1954 in Ormskirk, Lancashire, the son of Glyn Humphreys Sr, a lecturer in building project management at Liverpool University, and Dorothy (née Cross). He was educated at Merchant Taylors' Boys' School, Crosby followed by the University of Bristol where he gained both his bachelor's degree in 1976 and PhD in 1980.

== Academic career ==
Humphreys was previously a professor of cognitive psychology at the University of Birmingham, where he still holds an honorary professorship.

Humphreys was the Watts Professor of Experimental Psychology, head of the psychology department and principal investigator for the CNN Lab at Oxford University. He was also Fellow of Wolfson College, Oxford.

He was special professor at the University of Leipzig, University of Peking and the National Academy of Sciences China.

He edited the Quarterly Journal of Experimental Psychology, Visual Cognition and the Journal of Experimental Psychology: Human Perception and Performance.

He was a president of the Experimental Psychology Society and the president of the British Neuropsychology Society.

== Research background ==
His research interests covered a broad range of topics, from the diagnosis and management of cognitive problems after brain injury, as well as visual attention, perception, social cognition, language and the control of action. His work covers a wide range of neuropsychological disorders including agnosia, apraxia, action disorganisation syndrome, alexia and amnesia, and includes the development of new clinical screening instruments for detecting cognitive problems after brain injury.

Humphreys published over 500 journal articles and 16 books.

== Honours and awards ==
Humphreys held the Spearman Medal and Presidents' Award from the British Psychological Society, as well as the society's Cognitive Psychology Prize in 1998 and 2012. He was awarded the Donald Broadbent Prize for cognitive psychology research from the European Society for Cognitive Psychology (2012). He was a Fellow of the Royal Society of Medicine, the Humboldt Foundation and the British Academy. He was awarded an Honorary Life Fellowship of the Belgian Association for Psychological Science in 2002 and the British Psychological Society in 2012.

== Obituary ==
- Rumiati, Raffaella (February 2016). "Obituary for Professor Glyn Humphreys". Cortex. 75. Elsevier: A1–A2. doi:10.1016/j.cortex.2016.01.014. PMID 27299169. S2CID 42466556.
