= Feminist Approaches to Bioethics =

Academic network

Feminist Approaches to Bioethics (FAB)
- Formation: 1992
- Legal status: Network
- Purpose: Bioethics
- Key people: Mary C. Rawlinson; Anne Donchin
- Subsidiaries: Journal:
- Affiliations: International Association of Bioethics; International Journal of Feminist Approaches to Bioethics (IJFAB)
- Website: www.ijfab.org

Feminist Approaches to Bioethics (International Network on Feminist Approaches to Bioethics), or FAB, is a network of feminists in bioethics, adding feminist perspectives to ethical issues in health care and the biosciences. It publishes a journal, IJFAB: International Journal of Feminist Approaches to Bioethics, and is affiliated with the International Association of Bioethics, with which it meets.

== History ==
FAB was formed in 1992 at the inaugural meeting of the IAB. Its aims are to create a more inclusive bioethical theory from the viewpoint of disadvantaged groups such as women. It critiques bioethical theory that privileges groups with power.

As IJFAB editor Mary C. Rawlinson writes of the general state of bioethics in the introduction to the journal's inaugural issue,

It was as if the masculine marking of the subject in the history of ethics and politics made no difference. Just as medicine has often assumed that it could approach the female body through nosologies and clinical practices drawn from a study of the male body, philosophers and theorists in ethics and politics seemed to think that if feminism requires an extension of the rights of man, it does not require any rethinking of the basic concepts and strategies of bioethics itself.

This assessment assumes that man, the subject of both the sciences of man and the rights of man, supplies an absolute generic. Thus, women's experience is either a special case, whose logic may apply only to itself, or its difference is irrelevant and can be subsumed without harm or loss under the generic man.

From the beginning, feminist bioethics was suspicious of this logic of abstraction in both medicine and bioethics. Its approaches were informed by the feminist critique of this sleight of hand, in which a specific historical experience is installed as the absolute universal in science or ethics. As Anne Donchin and Margrit Shildrik note in this volume, early on feminist bioethics disputed the adequacy of abstract universal norms. Feminist approaches to bioethics challenged the field for its reliance on abstract principles disconnected from the material conditions of action and the specificities of the relationships in which ethical urgencies arise. Feminist bioethics continues to contribute significantly to this critique of abstraction in ethics by exposing the complicity of its supposedly generic subject with concepts of property, propriety (norms), and privilege, as well as with the material practices that these concepts authorize in relation to others.

Co-founding member Anne Donchin writes this on the occasion of FAB's 20th anniversary:

So what has FAB accomplished in its initial twenty years? We should take heart in our influence on the development of feminist bioethics. Through a shared vision and cross-fertilization of theoretical orientations, we have brought fresh perspectives to bioethical theory and major topics in bioethics. Our contributions are distinctive insofar as treatment of these topics is grounded in feminist scholarship that draws on background norms and prevailing conditions that shape health options. We look toward a future when feminist thought has a more profound influence on bioethics, when the voices of the socially marginalized are more fully recognized, and the needs of all social groups are integrated into a system of health-care justice that is responsive to the diverse needs of humans across the globe. That we’ve made it to our twentieth anniversary and continue to have such able leadership gives me fresh confidence that FAB’s future is assured.

Gendered Perspectives in Moral Development

The subordination of feminine moral perspectives became evident in the 1970s through early research on moral development and ethical reasoning. These studies, which primarily involved male researchers and participants, established a framework in which moral maturity was defined according to male-oriented standards. Consequently, women were often portrayed as morally underdeveloped and expected to conform to these dominant norms. Later feminist scholars challenged this bias, arguing that men and women may approach ethical decision-making differently, men tending toward an ethics of justice and women toward an ethics of care. This contrast between justice and care ethics highlights the need to reconsider prevailing standards of moral reasoning and to recognize the diversity of moral voices essential to contemporary ethical thought.

=== Autonomy and Reproductive Ethics ===
It is essential to critically examine the application of the autonomy principle, particularly in the context of women undergoing invasive reproductive procedures, to ensure that coercion is not obscured by rhetoric that perpetuates harm. Ethical evaluation should consider not only the choices made but also the processes through which those choices are formed. In clinical settings characterized by paternalism, where patients often receive insufficient information about their conditions, treatment options, and possible outcomes. decision-making tends to remain in the hands of professionals. As a result, patients’ lived experiences, emotions, and perspectives are frequently excluded from the ethical conversation.

=== Care-Based Feminist Approaches to Global Bioethics ===
A major contribution to understanding what might make bioethics genuinely global comes from feminist scholars who identify as care-based thinkers. These philosophers contrast the dominant rights- and justice-centered models of ethics with approaches grounded in relationships, empathy, and interdependence. Among them, Eva Feder Kittay has articulated this distinction particularly clearly.

According to Kittay (2006), rights- or justice-based ethics conceptualize moral agents as autonomous and independent individuals who interact as equals, guided by principles of fairness and rational deliberation. Moral reasoning within this framework typically occurs in formal settings, seeks universal applicability, and aims to resolve conflicts and balance competing claims. The central moral harm in this model arises from clashes between individuals.

By contrast, care-based ethics view moral agents as fundamentally relational and interdependent beings who exist within networks of trust, responsibility, and emotional connection. Deliberation in this context is narrative, contextual, and open to emotional understanding rather than abstract reasoning. Partiality and sensitivity to specific circumstances are valued rather than rejected, and the primary moral goal is the preservation of human relationships. The most significant moral failure in this framework is the rupture of connection, the breakdown of care and mutual recognition.

Care-based feminist approaches thus expand global bioethics by emphasizing the moral significance of interdependence and context. Rather than applying universal rules detached from lived experience, these frameworks seek to sustain relationships and recognize vulnerability as a shared human condition, offering a more inclusive and humane foundation for ethical decision-making across diverse cultural settings.

== See also ==
- Bioethics
- IJFAB: International Journal of Feminist Approaches to Bioethics
