= IJFAB: International Journal of Feminist Approaches to Bioethics =

- Discipline: Women's studies
- Language: English
- Edited by: Robyn Bluhm, Hilde Lindemann, Jamie Lindemann Nelson, Jackie Leach Scully

Publication details
- History: 2008–present
- Publisher: University of Toronto Press (Canada)
- Frequency: Biannually
- Impact factor: 0.488 (2015)

Standard abbreviations
- ISO 4: Int. J. Fem. Approaches Bioeth.

Indexing
- ISSN: 1937-4585 (print); 1937-4577 (web)
- LCCN: 2007212560
- JSTOR: 19374585
- OCLC no.: 750998848

Links
- Journal homepage; Online archive; Online access at Project MUSE

IJFAB: International Journal of Feminist Approaches to Bioethics is a biannual peer-reviewed academic journal providing a forum in bioethics for feminist thought and debate. The journal (pronounced "I-Jay-Fab") is a publication of the International Network on Feminist Approaches to Bioethics. Mary C. Rawlinson (of Stony Brook University) was its inaugural editor (2006) and served in that capacity until she stepped down in 2016. She was replaced by a team of editors including Robyn Bluhm, Hilde Lindemann, Jamie Lindemann Nelson (all of Michigan State University) and Jackie Leach Scully (of Newcastle University). Kate Caras as an employee of Indiana University Press was the journal's publisher from 2006 to 2014. She then transitioned to the position of senior managing editor when production was taken over by the University of Toronto Press in 2014.

A number of IJFAB's published articles include original contributions in French and Spanish; as well, some articles have been "specifically written and translated for IJFAB." The journal's fee structure is set up in such a way that copies can be made available for free to members in the Global South. The IJFAB Blog was started in 2013. Alison Reiheld is the editor.

== Scope ==
In its mission statement, IJFAB states that it "welcomes feminist scholarship from any discipline on ethical issues related to health, health care, and the biomedical sciences, or to the social, economic, and environmental determinants of health." The first call for papers was issued by Wendy Rogers and Carolyn McLeod (FAB Co-coordinators) and was published in 2008 as a special issue entitled, "Doing Feminist Bioethics." This issue addressed the contributions of feminist scholars to bioethics, aiming to show why gender matters in bioethics, and how feminist scholarship contributes to the field by shaping its methods, problems, and concepts. According to Mary C. Rawlinson, "[v]irtually every issue includes an array of global perspectives, as well as essays ...that clearly situate bioethical issues in their transnational context."

== Abstracting and indexing ==
The journal is abstracted and indexed in:

- Bibliography of Bioethics
- Current Contents/Social and Behavioural Sciences
- ETHXWeb
- GenETHX
- Scopus
- Social Sciences Citation Index
- Studies on Women and Gender Abstracts
- The Philosopher's Index

According to the Journal Citation Reports, the journal has a 2015 impact factor of 0.488, ranking it 30th out of 40 journals in the category "Women's Studies", and 38th out of 51 journals in the category "Ethics".

== See also ==
- List of ethics journals
- List of women's studies journals
