= Cognitive Neuroscience (journal) =

- Discipline: Neuroscience
- Language: English
- Edited by: Jamie Ward, Sharon Thompson-Schill

Publication details
- History: 2010–present
- Publisher: Taylor & Francis Group (United Kingdom)
- Frequency: Quarterly

Standard abbreviations
- ISO 4: Cogn. Neurosci.

Indexing
- ISSN: 1758-8928 (print); 1758-8936 (web)

Links
- Journal homepage

Cognitive Neuroscience is a peer-reviewed academic journal published four times a year by the Taylor & Francis Group. It publishes empirical and theoretical articles on all topics in the field of cognitive neuroscience. These include perception, attention, memory, language, action, decision-making, emotion, and social cognition. It is co-Edited by Jamie Ward of the University of Sussex and Sharon Thompson-Schill of the University of Pennsylvania.

== Aims and scope ==
The focus of the journal is undergraduate and graduate level neuroscience. The intended audience is college and university neuroscience teachers and students, as well as clinical practitioners and researchers in the field.

The journal's format is unusual in publishing shorter articles (of up to 4000 words) that are rapidly reviewed and published online. It also publishes longer (8000 word) discussion and review articles that evaluate current topics in the field, with critical analysis in the form of peer commentaries (800 words). The journal's stated aim is to publish accepted discussion papers and short report articles in uncorrected form online within 7 days of acceptance. The journal also pledges to publish the final form of these articles online within 6 weeks of acceptance.

== Abstracting and indexing ==
The journal is indexed in the following databases:

- Journal Citation Reports/Science Edition
- Neuroscience Citation Index
- PASCAL database, Institut de l’Information Scientifique et Technique (INIST)
- PsycINFO
- Science Citation Index Expanded
- SCOPUS
