= Yuko Munakata =

American psychologist

Yuko Munakata is a professor of psychology at the University of California, Davis.

== Professional career ==
She has specialized in developmental cognitive neuroscience, taking a connectionist approach to cognitive development. Her research investigates the processing mechanisms underlying cognitive development, using converging evidence from behavior, computational modeling, and cognitive neuroscience. She also focuses on understanding the prevalence of task-dependent behaviors during the first years of life. Munakata received a B.S. in symbolic systems at Stanford University in 1991 and a PhD in psychology at Carnegie Mellon University in 1996 under James McClelland; and completed a postdoctoral fellowship at the Massachusetts Institute of Technology from 1996–1997. She worked at the University of Denver from 1997–2001, University of Colorado Boulder from 2002-2019, and UC Davis from 2019-present
