= Rhonda Voskuhl =

American physician and academic

Rhonda Renee Voskuhl is an American physician, research scientist, and professor. She is a member of the Brain Research Institute (BRI) at the David Geffen School of Medicine at UCLA and is the director of its Multiple Sclerosis Program. She is widely recognized for pioneering work on sex-based differences in multiple sclerosis and advancing hormone-based neuroprotection research. Voskuhl has published numerous scientific articles in academic journals and has served in the role of principal investigator for several treatment trials investigating potential treatments for multiple sclerosis (MS).

== Research ==
=== Approach and Research Model ===
Voskuhl has described her research as "bedside to bench to bedside", meaning observations made in clinical settings are used as a basis for the investigation of the relevant biological mechanisms of action. The information discovered is then applied in a clinical setting, typically through a drug therapy.

=== MS and Female Sex Hormones ===
Due to well-documented differences in prevalence of MS in males and females, significant research on the autoimmune condition has turned to the neuropreservative effects of sex hormones. Evidence of suppression of MS symptoms in pregnant women in the third trimester ultimately led to a focus on the female sex hormone estriol.

==== The Mouse Model: Experimental Autoimmune Encephalomyelitis (EAE) ====
In 2001, Voskuhl published an article outlining discrepancies in EAE between male and female mice; she noted that females were more susceptible to EAE, mirroring the sex-based difference in MS in humans. It was found that the neuroprotective effects of testosterone contributed most to this discrepancy in mice. However, this sex difference is reduced during late pregnancy in females, when estriol levels are significantly higher than other periods of life. Her article established high levels of estriol as a possible explanation for the reduction in EAE symptoms observed during late pregnancy.

==== Estriol Treatment for Women with MS ====
In 2002, Voskuhl was part of the investigative team that found that treating non-pregnant women with 8mg/day estriol helped to relieve symptoms, including lesion number and volume. Upon cessation of treatment, lesion number and volume returned to pre-treatment levels. After reinstituting treatment, lesion number and volume again decreased significantly. Cognitive ability, evaluated by the Paced Auditory Serial Addition Test (PASAT), also improved in those treated with estriol. In the authors' abstract, they indicated that this result warranted further experimentation through a placebo-controlled clinical trial. This experiment was small, with only six women with relapse remitting MS (RRMS) and four women with secondary progressive MS (SPMS) finishing the trial. The authors noted that estriol generally improved symptoms in women with RRMS, but not in those with SPMS.

==== Molecular Basis for Estrogen's Neuroprotective Activity ====
In a 2011 research article, Voskuhl published data revealing that the estrogen receptor α (ERα) on astrocytes, not neurons, was responsible for the reduction of clinical EAE symptoms in mice. Using a gene knockout system Cre-Lox, the research team was able to remove ERα from neurons and in separate mice, remove ERα from astrocytes. It was found that the mice with ERα knocked out in astrocytes experienced an increase in clinical disease symptoms, macrophage and T-cell inflammation in the central nervous system, and axonal loss. These symptoms were not observed in those mice who had ERα removed from neurons.

==== Phase II Trial of Estriol as a Treatment for Women with RRMS ====
In 2016, the results of a Phase II Trial, in which Voskuhl participated, were released, detailing an experiment in which women with RRMS were treated daily with 8mg estriol or placebo, combined with 20 mg injectable glatiramer acetate - an immunomodulator currently used to treat MS. It was found that women with the estriol treatment had significantly less relapses than the placebo group (0.25 relapses/year and 0.37 relapses/year, respectively), with similar amounts of serious adverse health events. The success of this trial convinced the authors to report that a Phase III Trial was warranted.

=== MS and Male Sex Hormones ===
In 2008, Voskuhl, together with Dr. Stefan Gold et al., published a study that revealed the effects of treating men with MS with a 10g gel containing 100mg testosterone. Based upon the shift in cellular and chemical composition, particularly a decrease in IL-2 cell production, an increase in production growth factor TGFβ1, a decrease in CD4+ T cells, and an increase in NK (natural killer) cells, it was found that testosterone may play an important role in immunomodulation and neuroprotection.

In a 2009 review article discussing the effects of sex hormones on MS, Voskuhl and Gold noted that one small trial conducted by a research team headed by Dr. Nancy Sicotte suggested testosterone could be effective in preserving cognitive performance and reducing brain atrophy. However, this trial yielded no significant effect on the formation of brain lesions.

== In Media ==
=== NPR Morning Edition ===
In 2014, Voskuhl participated in an interview discussing estriol as a potential treatment for women with MS. The article discussed how estriol was identified as a potential candidate for drug treatment, including an anecdote about Melissa Glasser, a woman who experienced a reduction in her MS symptoms during each of her four pregnancies.

=== NPR Berlin ===
In 2016, Voskuhl was quoted in an article addressing gender bias in scientific study; she noted that male and female mice had different disease progression in the animal MS model.
