= Raffaella Rumiati =

Italian neuroscientist

- Born: Raffaella Ida Rumiati
- Scientific career
- Institutions: International School for Advanced Studies [Scuola Internazionale Superiore di Studi Avanzati], (SISSA), Italy
- Website: Official website

Raffaella Ida Rumiati is professor of cognitive neuroscience at the International School for Advanced Studies [Scuola Internazionale Superiore di Studi Avanzati], (SISSA), Italy. She sits on the editorial board of the journal Cognitive Neuropsychology, and is an action editor for the journal Brain and Cognition. Rumiati is also a member of the steering committee of the European Workshop on Cognitive Neuropsychology. and a member of The NeuroGenderings Network.

== Biography ==
After enrolling at the University of Bologna, she graduated in 1990 with a degree in philosophy, specializing in Psychology, with a thesis in experimental psychology on the memory of places. Continuing her studies, she conducted scientific research at the Faculty of Psychology at the University of Birmingham under the supervision of Glyn Humphreys and in 1995 she obtained her PhD from the University of Bologna with a thesis on the relationship between objects, words, and actions. In November of the same year, she joined the International School for Advanced Studies (SISSA) in Trieste as a researcher in Tim Shallice's laboratory.

In December 2003, she was appointed associate professor until 2011, when she became extraordinary professor; since December 2014, she has been full professor at SISSA, where she is also coordinator of the PhD program in Cognitive neuroscience.

In November 2015, she was appointed vice president of the ANVUR.

== Education ==
Rumiati trained for her PhD under the tutelage of professor Glyn W. Humphreys.
