= Victoria Pitts-Taylor =

- Born: Victoria Leigh Pitts

Academic background
- Education: Brandeis University
- Thesis: Body strategies: signifying the body in subculture (1999)

Academic work
- Main interests: Sociology, women's studies

Victoria Pitts-Taylor (née Pitts) is a Professor of Feminist, Gender, and Sexuality Studies, as well as Professor of Science in Society and Sociology, at Wesleyan University, Connecticut. She previously taught sociology at Queens College and the Graduate Center, CUNY, New York, and was a visiting fellow at the Centre for the Study of Social Difference, Columbia University, New York. Pitts-Taylor is also a former co-editor of the journal Women's Studies Quarterly. She is the recipient of the Robert K. Merton Book Award from the Science, Knowledge and Technology section of the American Sociological Association, and the Feminist Philosophy of Science Prize from the Women's Caucus of the Philosophy of Science Association.

== Education ==
Pitts-Taylor received her PhD in Sociology in 1999 from Brandeis University.

== Publications ==
- Pitts-Taylor, Victoria (2003). In the flesh: the cultural politics of body modification. New York: Palgrave Macmillan. ISBN 9780312293116.
- Pitts-Taylor, Victoria (2007). Surgery junkies: wellness and pathology in cosmetic culture. New Brunswick, New Jersey: Rutgers University Press. ISBN 9780813541624.
- Pitts-Taylor, Victoria, ed. (2008). The cultural encyclopedia of the body, Vol. I and 2. Westport, CT: Greenwood Press. ISBN 978-0313341458.
- Pitts-Taylor, Victoria, ed. (2016). Mattering: feminism, science and materialism. New York: New York University Press. ISBN 9781479845439.
- Pitts-Taylor, Victoria (2016). The brain's body: neuroscience and corporeal politics. Durham: Duke University Press. ISBN 9780822361268.
