= Sigrid Schmitz =

- Born: 1961 (age 64–65); Aachen, West Germany
- Education: Department of Biology, University of Marburg
- Scientific career
- Fields: Gender and science technology studies
- Workplaces: Humboldt University of Berlin
- Thesis: Influence of domestication on genetically fixed learning dispositions: a comparative analysis of wild Mallard and domesticated Peking ducks (1992)
- Website: Official website

Sigrid Schmitz (born 1961, Aachen, West Germany) is a visiting professor at the Humboldt University of Berlin, and was formerly the chair of gender studies and scientific head of the Gender Research Office [Referat Genderforschung] at the University of Vienna. Schmitz is also a member of The NeuroGenderings Network.

== Education ==
Schmitz gained her PhD in behavioral physiology from the Department of Biology, University of Marburg in 1992.

== Research ==
Schmitz main areas of research are gender and science technology studies with a particular focus in brain sciences and contemporary neurocultures.

== Books ==
- Schmitz, Sigrid; Höppner, Grit, eds. (2014). Gendered neurocultures: feminist and queer perspectives on current brain discourses. challenge GENDER, 2. Wien: Zaglossus. ISBN 9783902902122.

== See also ==
- Cognitive neuroscience
- Gender essentialism
- Neuroscience of sex differences
