= International Journal of Psychophysiology =

- Discipline: Psychophysiology
- Language: English
- Edited by: Michael J. Larson

Publication details
- History: 1983-present
- Publisher: International Organization of Psychophysiology and Elsevier
- Frequency: Monthly
- Open access: Yes
- Impact factor: 2.882 (2014)

Standard abbreviations
- ISO 4: Int. J. Psychophysiol.

Indexing
- ISSN: 0167-8760
- OCLC no.: 39038007

Links
- Journal homepage; Online access

The International Journal of Psychophysiology is a peer-reviewed official journal of the International Organization of Psychophysiology The subjects covered by the journal includes sensation and perception, evolution and development of behaviour, interhemispheric relations, learning and memory, sleep, stress, motivation and emotion, aggression and defence, information processing, psychopharmacology and psychophysiological disorders. It is currently published by the International Organization of Psychophysiology, Elsevier and edited by Michael J. Larson (Brigham Young University).

== Indexing and abstracting ==
According to the Journal Citation Reports, the journal has a 2014 impact factor of 2.882. The journal in indexing in the following bibliographic databases:

- Elsevier BIOBASE
- Cambridge Scientific Abstracts
- Current Contents/Life Sciences
- MEDLINE
- EMBASE
- PsycINFO Psychological Abstracts
- Reference Update
- Social and Behavioural Sciences
- Scopus
