= Journal of Neuroscience Research =

- Discipline: Neuroscience
- Language: English
- Edited by: Cristina A. Ghiani and J. Paula Warrington

Publication details
- History: 1975–present
- Publisher: Wiley-Liss
- Frequency: Monthly
- Impact factor: 4.164 (2020)

Standard abbreviations
- ISO 4: J. Neurosci. Res.

Indexing
- CODEN: JNREDK
- ISSN: 0360-4012 (print); 1097-4547 (web)
- LCCN: 75649019
- OCLC no.: 02244695

Links
- Journal homepage; Online access; Online archive

The Journal of Neuroscience Research is a monthly peer-reviewed scientific journal covering all aspects of neuroscience. It was established in 1975 and is published by Wiley-Liss. The editors-in-chief are Cristina A. Ghiani and J. Paula Warrington. The journal publishes full-length papers, reviews, mini-reviews, and commentaries.

According to the Journal Citation Reports, the journal has a 2020 impact factor of 4.164.

== Abstracting and indexing ==
The journal is abstracted and indexed in:

- Biological Abstracts
- BIOSIS Previews
- CAB Direct
- CAB HEALTH
- Cambridge Scientific Abstracts
- Chemical Abstracts Service
- Chemoreception Abstracts
- CSA Animal Behavior Abstracts
- CSA Biological Sciences Database
- Current Awareness in Biological Sciences
- Current Contents/Life Sciences
- Elsevier BIOBASE
- EMBASE
- Index Medicus/MEDLINE/PubMed
- International Bibliographic Information on Dietary Supplements
- Neuroscience Citation Index
- Neurosciences Abstracts
- Psychological Abstracts/PsycINFO
- Science Citation Index
- Scopus
- VINITI Database RAS
