= Heidi Maibom =

Philosophy professor

Heidi L. Maibom
- Education: University College London (Ph.D. in Philosophy, 2000)
- Occupation: Philosopher
- Known for: Work on empathy, moral emotions, psychopathy, imagination, responsibility, theory of mind
- Title: Professor of Philosophy

Heidi L. Maibom is a philosophy professor with dual appointments at the University of Cincinnati and the University of the Basque Country. Her research focuses on empathy, responsibility, imagination, psychopathy, moral emotions and theory of mind.

== Career ==
She received her Ph.D. in Philosophy from University College London in 2000. She has held various research positions, including Carlsberg Research Fellow at Lucy Cavendish College, Cambridge University (1993–1994); Postdoctoral Fellow in the Philosophy-Neuroscience-Psychology Program at Washington University in St. Louis (2001–2003); Laurence S. Rockefeller Visiting Fellow at the University Center for Human Values, Princeton University (2007–2008); and TAFT Center Research Fellow at the University of Cincinnati (2017–2018). Prior to her appointment at the University of Cincinnati, Maibom served as an assistant and associate professor of philosophy and cognitive science at Carleton University from 2003 to 2013.

== Publications ==
Maibom is the author of The Space Between. How Empathy Really Works and Empathy.

Maibom is also the editor of Empathy and Morality (2014) and of The Routledge Handbook of Philosophy of Empathy (2017), as well as the co-editor of "Neurofeminism" (2012) with R. Bluhm and A.J. Jacobsen, and Empathy and Morality (2014).

Maibom appeared in several podcasts, including "unSILOed", "In the Cave", "Choice", and "The Veritas Forum".

Peer-reviewed publications are:

- Maibom, Heidi L. (2001) – Tacit Knowledge & Folk Psychology. Danish Yearbook of Philosophy, 35, 95–114.
- Maibom, Heidi L. (2003) – The Mindreader and the Scientist. Mind & Language, 18, 296–315.
- Maibom, Heidi L. (2007) – Social Systems. Philosophical Psychology, 20, 557–578.
- Maibom, Heidi L. (2007) – The Presence of Others. Philosophical Studies, 132, 161–190.
- Maibom, Heidi L. (2009) – Feeling for Others: Empathy, Sympathy, and Morality. Inquiry, 52, 483–499.
- Maibom, Heidi L. (2009) – In Defence of (Model) Theory Theory. Journal of Consciousness Studies, 16, 360–378.
- Maibom, Heidi L. (2010) – Imagining Others. Atelier de l’Ethique, 5(1), 34–49.
- Maibom, Heidi L. (2012) – The Many Faces of Empathy and Their Relation to Prosocial Action and Aggression Inhibition. Wiley Interdisciplinary Reviews: Cognitive Science (WIRE), 3, 253–263. doi: 10.1002/wcs.1168
- Maibom, Heidi L. (2013) – Folk Psychology. In H. Pashler (Ed.), The Encyclopedia of the Mind (pp. 334–336) – SAGE Publications.
- Maibom, Heidi L. (2013) – Theory Theory. In B. Kaldis (Ed.), Encyclopedia of Philosophy and the Social Sciences (pp. 1010–1012) – SAGE Publications.
- Maibom, Heidi L. (2014) – (Almost) Everything You Ever Wanted to Know About Empathy. In H. L. Maibom (Ed.), Empathy and Morality (pp. 1–40) – New York: Oxford University Press.
- Maibom, Heidi L. (2014) – Without Fellow Feeling. In T. Schramme (Ed.), Being Immoral: Psychopaths and Moral Indifference (pp. 91–114) – Cambridge, MA: MIT Press.
- Maibom, Heidi L. (Ed.) (2014) – Empathy and Morality. New York: Oxford University Press.
- Maibom, Heidi L. (2016) – Knowing Me, Knowing You: Failure to Forecast and the Empathic Imagination. In A. Kind & P. Kung (Eds.), Knowledge Through Imagination (pp. 185–206) – New York: Oxford University Press.
- Maibom, Heidi L. (2017) – Affective Empathy. In H. L. Maibom (Ed.), The Routledge Handbook of Philosophy of Empathy (pp. 22–35) – London: Routledge.
- Maibom, Heidi L. (2017) – Introduction. In H. L. Maibom (Ed.), The Routledge Handbook of Philosophy of Empathy (pp. 1–10) – London: Routledge.
- Maibom, Heidi L. (Ed.) (2017) – The Routledge Handbook of Philosophy of Empathy. London: Routledge.
- Maibom, Heidi L. (2018) – Self-Simulation and Empathy. In T. Schramme & N. Roughley (Eds.), Forms of Fellow Feeling: Empathy, Sympathy, Concern and Moral Agency (pp. 109–132) – Cambridge University Press.
- Maibom, Heidi L. (2018) – What can we learn from taking another’s perspective? In D. Matravers & A. Waldoff (Eds.), Empathy: Between Einfühlung and Attunement (pp. 74–90) – London: Routledge.
- Maibom, Heidi L. (2019) – Empathy and Emotion Regulation. Philosophical Topics, 47(2), 149–163.
- Maibom, Heidi L. (2019) – Empathy. In T. Polger (Ed.), Routledge Encyclopedia of Philosophy. London: Routledge. doi: 10.4324/9780415249126-L154-1
