= Neuroscience of sex differences =

Characteristics of the brain that differentiate the male brain and the female brain

Human brain. Hypothalamus Amygdala Hippocampus and fornix Pons Pituitary gland

The neuroscience of sex differences is the study of characteristics that separate brains of different sexes. Psychological sex differences are generally thought to reflect the interaction of genes, hormones, and social learning on brain development throughout the lifespan.

A 2021 meta-synthesis led by Lise Eliot found that sex accounted for less than 1% of the brain's structure or laterality, finding large group-level differences only in total brain volume. A subsequent 2021 study led by Camille Michèle Williams contradicted Eliot's conclusions, finding that sex differences in total brain volume are not accounted for merely by sex differences in height, and that once global brain size is taken into account, there remain numerous regional sex differences in both directions. In 2022 Alex DeCasien analyzed the studies from both Eliot and Williams, concluding that "The human brain shows highly reproducible sex differences in regional brain anatomy above and beyond sex differences in overall brain size" and that these differences are of a "small-moderate effect size." In 2024 Eliot responded by showing that those small-moderate differences have not reproduced across 6 large recent studies, including Williams et al., and concluding that species-wide regional brain sex differences have not been found to exist in humans.

An earlier review from 2006 and meta-analysis from 2014 stated that male and female brains cannot always be assumed to be identical from either structural or functional perspective, calling them sexually dimorphic, a term that Williams, DeCasien and Eliot agree does not accurately describe the human brain.

== History ==
The ideas of differences between the male and female brains have circulated since the time of Ancient Greek philosophers around 850 BC. In 1854, German anatomist Emil Huschke discovered a size difference in the frontal lobe, where male frontal lobes are 1% larger than those of females. As the 19th century progressed, scientists began researching sexual dimorphisms in the brain significantly more. Until recent decades, scientists knew of several structural sexual dimorphisms of the brain, but they did not think that sex had any impact on how the human brain performs daily tasks. Through molecular, animal, and neuroimaging studies, a great deal of information regarding the differences between male and female brains in regards to both structure and function has been uncovered.

== Evolutionary explanations ==
=== Sexual selection ===
Females show enhanced information recall compared with males. This may be due to the fact that females have a more intricate evaluation of risk–scenario contemplation, based on a prefrontal cortical control of the amygdala. For example, the ability to recall information better than males most likely originated from sexual selective pressures on females during competition with other females in mate selection. Recognition of social cues was an advantageous characteristic, because it ultimately maximized offspring and was therefore selected for during evolution.

Oxytocin is a hormone that induces contraction of the uterus and lactation in mammals and is also a characteristic hormone of nursing mothers. Studies have found that oxytocin improves spatial memory. Through activation of the MAP kinase pathway, oxytocin plays a role in the enhancement of long-term synaptic plasticity, which is a change in strength between two neurons over a synapse that lasts for minutes or longer, and long-term memory. This hormone may have helped mothers remember the location of distant food sources so they could better nurture their offspring.

According to certain studies, men on average have one standard deviation higher spatial cognition than women. This domain is one of the few where clear sex differences in cognition appear. Researchers at the University of Toronto found that differences between men and women on some tasks that require spatial skills are largely eliminated after both groups play a video game for only a few hours. Although Herman Witkin had claimed women are more "visually dependent" than men, this has recently been disputed.

The gender difference in spatial ability was found in one small study to be associated with different morphological findings in male and female brains. The parietal lobe is a part of the brain that is recognized to be involved in spatial ability, especially for mental rotation. Researchers at the University of Iowa found that the thicker grey matter in the parietal lobe of females led to a disadvantage in mental rotations, and that the larger surface areas of the parietal lobe of males led to an advantage in mental rotations. These odd findings were argued to support the notion that gender differences in spatial abilities arose during human evolution, however, they have not been replicated, and the effect of socialization and experience on the difference in spatial ability is likely strong. Eliot et al. reviewed 19 functional imaging studies that collectively showed similar patterns of parietal lobe activation in both men and women during mental rotation tasks, with no reliable sex differences.

== Male and female brain anatomy ==
A 2021 meta-synthesis of existing literature found that sex accounted for 1% of the brain's structure or laterality, finding large group-level differences only in total brain volume. A 2022 follow-up study challenged these findings and concluded that "The human brain shows highly reproducible sex differences in regional brain anatomy above and beyond sex differences in overall brain size" and that these differences were of a "small-to-moderate effect size." In another study, men were found to have a total myelinated fiber length of 176 000 km at the age of 20, whereas in women the total length was 149 000 km (approx. 15% less).

Many similarities and differences in structure, neurotransmitters, and function have been identified, but some academics, such as Cordelia Fine and Anelis Kaiser, Sven Haller, Sigrid Schmitz, and Cordula Nitsch dispute the existence of significant sex differences in the brain, arguing that innate differences in the neurobiology of women and men have not been conclusively identified due to factors such as alleged neurosexism, methodological flaws and publication bias. Clinical psychologist Simon Baron-Cohen has defended the neuroscience of sex differences against charges of neurosexism, arguing that "Fine's neurosexism allegation is the mistaken blurring of science with politics," adding that "you can be a scientist interested in the nature of sex differences while being a clear supporter of equal opportunities and a firm opponent of all forms of discrimination in society."

Males and females differ in some aspects of their brains, notably the overall difference in size, with men having larger brains on average (between 8% and 13% larger), but a relationship between brain volume or density and brain function is not established. Additionally, there are differences in activation patterns that suggest functional differences which could arise as a result of experience.

There are anatomical differences between the male and female brains (described below), but in most cases, these are more evident in adulthood than at birth. It is unclear whether sex differences reflect gender identity or are a consequence of it. Therefore, although current evidence supports some involvement of early, even prenatal, factors in these processes, their cause and relative importance remain unknown.

=== Volume ===
Structurally, adult male brains are on average 11–12% heavier and 10% bigger than female brains. Though statistically there are sex differences in white matter and gray matter percentage, this ratio is directly related to brain size, and some argue these sex differences in gray and white matter percentage are caused by the average size difference between men and women. Others argue that these differences partly remain after controlling for brain volume.

Researchers also found greater cortical thickness and cortical complexity in females before and after adjusting for overall brain volume. In contrast, surface area, brain volume and fractional anisotropy was found to be greater in males before and after adjusting for overall brain volume. Despite attributes remaining greater for both male and female, the overall difference in these attributes decreased after adjusting for overall brain volume, except the cortical thickness in females, which increased. Given that cortical complexity and cortical features have had some evidence of positive correlation with intelligence, researchers postulated that these differences might have evolved for females to compensate for smaller brain size and equalize overall cognitive abilities with males, though the reason for environmental selection of that trait is unknown.

Researchers further analyzed the differences in brain volume, surface area and cortical thickness by testing the men and women on verbal-numerical reasoning and reaction time in separate groups. It was found that the group of men slightly outperformed the women in both the verbal-numerical reasoning and reaction time tests. Subsequently, the researchers tested to what extent the differences in performance was mediated by the varying attributes of the male and female brain (e.g. surface area) using two mixed sample groups. In verbal-numerical reasoning tests, surface area and brain volume mediated performance by >82% in both groups, and cortical thickness mediated performance far less, by 7.1% and 5.4% in each group. In reaction time tests, total brain and white matter volumes mediated performance by >27%, but the other attributes all mediated performance by smaller percentages (<15.3%), particularly mean cortical thickness (mediating <3% of performance).

According to the neuroscience journal review series Progress in Brain Research, it has been found that males have larger and longer planum temporale and Sylvian fissure while females have significantly larger proportionate volumes to total brain volume in the superior temporal cortex, Broca's area, the hippocampus and the caudate nucleus. The midsagittal and fiber numbers in the anterior commissure that connect the temporal poles and mass intermedia that connects the thalami is also larger in women.

=== Lateralization ===
Lateralization may differ between the sexes, with men often being said to have a more lateralized brain, because they tend to use one hemisphere for a behavior more consistently than females. One factor supporting this idea is the higher rate of left-handedness among males. Another example is that language is typically more strongly left-lateralized in males than in females. Additionally, males show stronger right-lateralization in emotional-face processing tasks, suggesting sex differences in brain lateralization go beyond just language. These differences may be linked to factors like how the two brain hemispheres interact and differences in the corpus callosum, rather than directly to sex hormones. Other biological factors, such as cortisol levels and dopamine asymmetries, may also play a role in these differences, particularly in decision-making and emotional responses.

Further evidence comes from studies using turning preferences as a way to measure brain lateralization. While no major sex differences were found in the direction or strength of laterality, males showed more consistent lateralization across different situations. This suggests that males may have stronger and more stable brain lateralization. However, the relationship between brain lateralization and cognitive abilities remains unclear and is likely influenced by many biological factors.

Overall, the evidence for sex difference in human brain lateralization remains weak. A 2008 meta-analysis found no significant difference between males and females in either planum temporale asymmetry or functional language lateralization. Moreover, a 2019 review of 40 years of research concluded that sex differences in laterality are consistently observed but "very small" (Cohen's d = 0.05 to 0.15) and "... certainly not the driving force behind sex differences in cognitive functioning."

=== Amygdala ===
The amygdala (red) in a human brain

There are behavioral differences between males and females that may suggest a difference in amygdala size or function. A 2017 review of amygdala volume studies found that there was a raw size difference, with males having a 10% larger amygdala, however, because male brains are larger, this finding was found to be misleading. After normalizing for brain size, there was no significant difference in size of the amygdala across sex.

In terms of activation, there is no difference in amygdala activation across sex. Differences in behavioral tests may be due to potential anatomical and physiological differences in the amygdala across sexes rather than activation differences.

Emotional expression, understanding, and behavior appears to vary between males and females. A 2012 review concluded that males and females have differences in the processing of emotions. Males tend to have stronger reactions to threatening stimuli and males react with more physical violence.

=== Hippocampus ===
Hippocampus atrophy is associated with a variety of psychiatric disorders that have higher prevalence in females. Additionally, there are differences in memory skills between males and females which may suggest a difference in the hippocampal volume (HCV). A 2016 meta-analysis of volume differences found a higher HCV in males without correcting for total brain size. However, after adjusting for individual differences and total brain volume, they found no significant sex difference, despite the expectation that women may have larger hippocampus volume.

=== Grey matter ===
A 2014 meta-analysis found (where differences were measured) some differences in grey matter levels between the sexes.

The findings included females having more grey matter volume in the right frontal pole, inferior and middle frontal gyrus, pars triangularis, planum temporale/parietal operculum, anterior cingulate gyrus, insular cortex, and Heschl's gyrus; both thalami and precuneus; the left parahippocampal gyrus and lateral occipital cortex (superior division). Females had the greatest additional grey matter volume in areas of the brain's right hemisphere that are associated with language, as well as in the right insular cortex, the anterior cingulate gyrus, and other limbic structures.

Males had more grey matter volume in both amygdalae, hippocampi, anterior parahippocampal gyri, posterior cingulate gyri, precuneus, putamen and temporal poles, areas in the left posterior and anterior cingulate gyri, and areas in the cerebellum bilateral VIIb, VIIIa and Crus I lobes, left VI and right Crus II lobes.

In terms of density, there were also differences between the sexes. Males tended to have a denser left amygdala, hippocampus, insula, pallidum, putamen, claustrum, and areas of the right VI lobule of the cerebellum, among other areas. Females tended to have denser left frontal pole.

The significance of these differences lies both in the lateralization (males having more volume in the left hemisphere and females having more volume in the right hemisphere) and the possible uses of these findings to explore differences in neurological and psychiatric conditions.

=== Transgender studies on brain anatomy ===
Early postmortem studies investigating neurological differentiation in transgender individuals focused primarily on sexually dimorphic regions of the brain, including the hypothalamus and amygdala. Using magnetic resonance imaging (MRI), some studies have reported that trans women exhibit female-typical characteristics in specific brain regions, such as larger putamen volumes compared with cisgender males. However, these same studies have also found that overall regional gray matter volumes in trans women remain largely consistent with those of cisgender male control groups.

Postmortem research has also reported that trans women may show female-typical features in the central subdivision of the bed nucleus of the stria terminalis (BSTc) and in the interstitial nucleus of the anterior hypothalamus number 3 (INAH-3), based on neuronal counts within these regions. Several methodological limitations have been noted in relation to these findings. Sexual orientation was not consistently controlled across study samples, which limits the ability to distinguish neuroanatomical features associated with gender identity from those associated with sexual orientation, as sexually dimorphic differences in hypothalamic and related brain regions have also been reported in studies of homosexual cisgender individuals.

In addition, all male-to-female (MtF) subjects examined in postmortem studies of the bed nucleus of the stria terminalis (BSTc) had undergone long-term cross-sex hormone therapy, making it difficult to determine whether observed differences reflect developmental factors or are attributable to the effects of hormone treatment, which has been shown to induce structural brain changes.

Furthermore, developmental studies have indicated that sex differences in the BSTc emerge primarily during adulthood rather than early childhood, raising uncertainty as to whether observed BSTc differences are causally related to the development of gender identity or represent neuroanatomical changes that occur after gender identity has already been established.

Some researchers have noted that similar patterns of sexually dimorphic brain variation have been observed in studies of sexual orientation. Neuroimaging research has reported that homosexual cisgender males, on average, exhibit brain features that trend toward female-typical patterns in regions such as the thalamus, precentral gyrus, gray matter distribution, and putamen when compared with heterosexual cisgender males.

As a result, reviews of the literature have emphasized that observed sex-atypical brain characteristics in transgender populations do not uniquely distinguish gender identity from other factors, including sexual orientation, and that current findings remain insufficient to establish a definitive neuroanatomical basis for gender identity.

== Brain networks ==
Both males and females have consistent active working memory networks composed of both middle frontal gyri, the left cingulate gyrus, the right precuneus, the left inferior and superior parietal lobes, the right claustrum, and the left middle temporal gyrus. Although the same brain networks are used for working memory, specific regions are sex-specific. Sex differences were evident in other networks, as women also tend to have higher activity in the prefrontal and limbic regions, such as the anterior cingulate, bilateral amygdala, and right hippocampus, while men tend to have a distributed network spread out among the cerebellum, portions of the superior parietal lobe, the left insula, and bilateral thalamus.

A 2017 review from the perspective of large-scale brain networks hypothesized that women's higher susceptibility to stress-prone disorders such as post-traumatic stress disorder and major depressive disorder, in which the salience network is theorized to be overactive and to interfere with the executive control network, may be due in part, along with societal exposure to stressors and the coping strategies that are available to women, to underlying sex-based brain differences.

== Neurochemical differences ==
=== Hormones ===
Gonadal hormones, or sex hormones, include androgens (such as testosterone) and estrogens (such as estradiol), which are steroid hormones synthesized primarily in the testes and ovaries. Sex hormone production is regulated by the gonadotropic hormones luteinizing hormone (LH) and follicle-stimulating hormone (FSH), whose release from the anterior pituitary is stimulated by gonadotropin-releasing hormone (GnRH) from the hypothalamus.

Steroid hormones have several effects on brain development as well as maintenance of homeostasis throughout adulthood. Estrogen receptors have been found in the hypothalamus, pituitary gland, hippocampus, and frontal cortex, indicating the estrogen plays a role in brain development. Gonadal hormone receptors have also been found in the basal fore-brain nuclei.

==== Estrogen and the female brain ====
Estradiol influences cognitive function, specifically by enhancing learning and memory in a dose-sensitive manner. Too much estrogen can have negative effects by weakening performance of learned tasks as well as hindering performance of memory tasks; this can result in females exhibiting poorer performance of such tasks when compared to males.

Ovariectomies, surgeries inducing menopause, or natural menopause cause fluctuating and decreased estrogen levels in women. This in turn can "attenuate the effects" of endogenous opioid peptides. Opioid peptides are known to play a role in emotion and motivation. The content of β-endorphin (β-EP), an endogenous opioid peptide, has been found to decrease (in varying amounts/brain region) post ovariectomy in female rats within the hypothalamus, hippocampus, and pituitary gland. Such a change in β-EP levels could be the cause of mood swings, behavioral disturbances, and hot flashes in post menopausal women.

==== Progesterone and the male and female brain ====
Progesterone is a steroid hormone synthesized in both male and female brains. It contains characteristics found in the chemical nucleus of both estrogen and androgen hormones. As a female sex hormone, progesterone is more significant in females than in males. During the menstrual cycle, progesterone increases just after the ovulatory phase to inhibit luteinizing hormones, such as oxytocin absorption. In men, increased progesterone has been linked to adolescents with suicidal ideation.

==== Testosterone and the male brain ====
The gonadal hormone testosterone is an androgenic, or masculinizing, hormone that is synthesized in both the male testes and female ovaries, at a rate of about 14,000 μg/day and 600 μg/day, respectively. Testosterone exerts organizational effects on the developing brain, many of which are mediated through estrogen receptors following its conversion to estrogen by the enzyme aromatase within the brain.

== See also ==
- Biology and sexual orientation
- Neuroplasticity
- Neuroscience and sexual orientation
- Puberty § Neurohormonal process
- Rett syndrome
- Sex differences in psychology
- Sexually dimorphic nucleus
- The NeuroGenderings Network
