= Neuroethics (journal) =

- Discipline: Neuroethics
- Language: English
- Edited by: Adrian Carter and Katrina Sifferd

Publication details
- History: 2008–present
- Publisher: Springer Science+Business Media
- Frequency: Triannual
- Impact factor: 0.986 (2018)

Standard abbreviations
- ISO 4: Neuroethics

Indexing
- ISSN: 1874-5490 (print); 1874-5504 (web)
- LCCN: 2010247809
- OCLC no.: 314007307

Links
- Journal homepage; Online access; Online archive

Neuroethics is a triannual peer-reviewed academic journal covering the field of neuroethics and related issues in the sciences of the mind. In the opening editorial, founding editor-in-chief Neil Levy described the journal as focusing on both "ethical reflection on new technologies and techniques produced by neuroscience (and other sciences of the mind)" and "the ways in which the new knowledge emerging from the sciences of the mind illuminates traditional philosophical topics."

The journal is published by Springer Science+Business Media and is co-edited by Adrian Carter (Monash University) and Katrina Sifferd (Elmhurst University).

== Abstracting and indexing ==
The journal is abstracted and indexed in:

- CSA databases
- Current Contents/Social & Behavioral Sciences
- Embase
- InfoTrac databases
- The Philosopher's Index
- ProQuest databases
- PsycINFO
- Science Citation Index Expanded
- Scopus
- Social Sciences Citation Index

According to the Journal Citation Reports, the journal has a 2018 impact factor of 0.986.
