= Gender essentialism =

Attribution of intrinsic qualities to genders

Gender essentialism is a theory which attributes distinct, intrinsic qualities to women and men. Based in essentialism, it holds that there are certain universal, innate, biologically (or psychologically) based features of gender that are at the root of many of the group differences observed in the behavior of men and women.

In Western civilization, it is suggested in writings going back to ancient Greece. With the advent of Christianity, the earlier Greek model was expressed in theological discussions as the doctrine that there are two distinct sexes, male and female, created by God, and that individuals are immutably one or the other. This view remained largely unchanged until the middle of the 19th century. This changed the locus of the origin of the essential differences from religion to biology, in Sandra Bem's words, "from God's grand creation [to] its scientific equivalent: evolution's grand creation," but the belief in an immutable origin had not changed.

Alternatives to gender essentialism were proposed in the mid-20th century. During second-wave feminism, Simone de Beauvoir and other feminists in the 1960s and '70s theorized that gender differences were socially constructed. In other words, people gradually conform to gender differences through their experience of the social world. More recently, Judith Butler theorized that gender is performative. While rejected by many feminist theorists, gender essentialism sheds light on social constructs surrounding gender that are found in society as well as societal views on sex and sexuality.

== In religion ==
The male–female dichotomy has been an important factor in most religions. In the Abrahamic religions the difference between man and woman is established at the origin of time, with the Bible saying of Adam and Eve, "... in the image of God he created them; male and female he created them", indicating that the difference is instituted by God. Some discuss whether this verse is an expression of gender essentialism or a reference to humanity as a whole.

=== Religion and biology ===
Gender essentialism has been heavily influenced by both religion and by science, with religion being the prominent reasoning behind gender essentialism until the mid-1800s. The reasoning ultimately changed from religion to science, but still supported the same essentialist thinking.

==== Latter-day Saints ====
The official view of the Church of Jesus Christ of Latter-day Saints (LDS Church) is an essentialist belief in gender. The 1995 LDS Church statement The Family: A Proclamation to the World declares gender to be an "essential characteristic" and an "eternal identity". Mormons generally believe in an eternal life and that it would be impossible for one's eternal gender to be different from one's physical, birth sex. Church regulations permit, but do not mandate, ex-communication for those who choose gender confirmation surgery, and deny them membership in the priesthood.

== In biology ==
The gender essentialist claim of biology theorizes that gender differences are rooted in nature and biology. Historical views based in gender essentialism claim that there are biological causes for the differences between men and women, such as women giving birth and men going out and hunting. This claim is analyzed in detail by Emily Martin in her article "Medical Metaphors of Women's Bodies: Menstruation and Menopause". In her article, Martin examines some of the historical views that used biology to explain the differences between women and men. One popular medical view in ancient Greece was that malaise was associated with excess moisture. The masculine form was considered hotter and dryer. Through sweat, the male body was better able to balance this humour than the colder, wetter female form which regulated through menstruation.

In 1975, American biologist, Edward O. Wilson, claimed that "both human and social behavior and human organization" are encoded in human genes. He later added to this claim, using the example of reproduction and how one male can fertilize many females but a female can be fertilized by only one male.

=== Biologism ===
Biologism is a particular form of essentialism that defines women's and men's essence in terms of biological capacities. This form of essentialism is based on a form of reductionism, meaning that social and cultural factors are the effects of biological causes. Biological reductivism "claim[s] that anatomical and physiological differences—especially reproductive differences—characteristic of human males and females determine both the meaning of masculinity and femininity and the appropriately different positions of men and women in society". Biologism uses the functions of reproduction, nurturance, neurology, neurophysiology, and endocrinology to limit women's social and psychological possibilities according to biologically established limits. It asserts the science of biology to constitute an unalterable definition of identity, which inevitably "amounts to a permanent form of social containment for women".

Naturalism is also a part of the system of essentialism where a fixed nature is postulated for women through the means of theological or ontological rather than biological grounds. An example of this would be the claim that women's nature is a God-given attribute, or the ontological invariants in Sartrean existentialism or Freudian psychoanalysis that distinguish the sexes in the "claim that the human subject is somehow free or that the subject's social position is a function of his or her genital morphology". These systems are used to homogenize women into one singular category and to strengthen a binary between men and women.

=== Superior gender ===
Throughout history women have been viewed as the submissive and inferior gender. In ancient Greece, this view was supported by the belief that women had to rid their bodies of toxins by menstruating while men could sweat their toxins out. By the 1800s, this view remained the same, but the reasoning had changed. In 1879, the French doctor, Gustave Le Bon, explained this inferiority of women as their brains being closer to the size of gorillas than most male brains. Le Bon also stated that women were fickle, inconsistent, lacked thought and logic, and were not able to reason.

=== Child development ===
Children have been observed making gender categorizations and displaying essentialist beliefs about gender preferences and indications. Proponents of gender essentialism propose that children from the age of 4 to 10 show the tendency to endorse the role of nature in determining gender-stereotyped properties, an "early bias to view gender categories as predictive of essential, underlying similarities", which gradually declines as they pass elementary school years.

== Criticism ==
=== Feminist critique ===
In feminist theory and gender studies, gender essentialism is the attribution of a fixed essence to women. Women's essence is assumed to be universal and is generally identified with those characteristics viewed as being specifically feminine. These ideas of femininity are usually related to biology and often concern psychological characteristics such as nurturance, empathy, support, non-competitiveness, etc. By the late 1980s and 1990s, anti-essentialism became a dominant trend in feminist thought. Anti-essentialists argued that there are no universal characteristics shared by all women, and that any attempt to define women in such terms is both descriptively false and politically oppressive.

In 1980, Monique Wittig published One Is Not Born A Woman, an article that discusses how gender essentialist views regarding men, women, and gender roles work to re-establish patriarchal roles and ideas in society. She also talks about how these views contribute to women's oppression, focusing on "lesbianism" and how it goes against the "rules" that society has set in place. Wittig's piece attempts to show how the gender essentialist claim of normal gender is rooted in homophobia and how these roots continue to allow women to be oppressed.

Elizabeth V. Spelman, in her influential book Inessential Woman (1988) criticized feminist theories that took the experiences of privileged women (e.g., white, middle-class women) as the norm, thereby excluding or marginalizing other women.

In 1988, Emily Martin published Medical Metaphors of Women's Bodies: Menstruation and Menopause. This piece analyzed the history of gender essentialist claims and how biology has been used to explain differences between genders. This claim of biology, according to Martin, dates back to ancient Greece. Martin explains that, throughout history, views regarding women varied with menstruation originally being viewed as something important but still something that made women lesser, but later changing to be viewed as a disorder that negatively impacted women's lives. Martin's piece provides insight on how society places great importance on the different biological processes between genders.

The 1993 publication of The Lenses of Gender by Sandra Bem addresses how gender differences are perceived by society. She also talks about how essentialist gender roles reproduce male power.

==== Transfeminist critique ====
Essentialism of gender in feminist theory presents a problem regarding transfeminism. Gayle Salamon writes that trans studies are to be "the breaking apart of this category, particularly if that breaking requires a new articulation of the relation between sex and gender, male and female". Transubjectivity challenges the binary of gender essentialism as it disrupts the "fixed taxonomies of gender" and this creates a resistance in women's studies, which as a discipline has historically depended upon the fixedness of gender.

Sandy Stone offered a critique to essentialist discourses of gender in "The Empire Strikes Back: A Posttranssexual Manifesto" (1987), a foundational essay in transgender studies. Since then, other theorists like Jack Halberstam, Jay Prosser, Judith Butler, Julia Serano, Paul B. Preciado and Susan Stryker have written on the topic.

==== Feminist support of essentialism ====
Some feminists have assumed gender essentialism, or argued for it explicitly. Cultural feminism, for example, is a strain of radical feminism that appeals to gender essentialism to exalt what it considers to be intrinsically female. Ecofeminism and French sexual difference feminism also face accusations of essentialism.

Elyce Rae Helford, a gender researcher, notes that Laura Mulvey's theory of male gaze has been criticised for essentialism.

In her book The Case Against the Sexual Revolution, Louise Perry points out that men and women show significant group differences in measured sociosexuality, and argues that, from the perspective of evolutionary biology, such differences are to be expected, given the distinct reproductive strategies available to each sex. Perry concludes that denial of gender essentialism, at least in this case, harms the interests of women by favoring a culture of sexual interaction better suited to the sexual preferences of high-status men. Perry's book lays out other arguments in this theme, which have also been explored and developed by other feminists.

=== Intersectional critique ===
Analyzing gender has long been a central concern of feminist theory, which has sought to explore how gender constructs meaning. While developing theories of gender, feminist discourse has often ignored other aspects of women's identities—such as race, class, and sexual orientation—thereby marginalizing the voices and experiences of women of color, non-Western women, working-class women, queer women, and trans women.

Essentialism challenges feminist theory by questioning how gender can be both an identity and a marker of difference, posing problems for the idea of subjectivity in feminist theories. Black and lesbian feminists, in particular, have argued that feminist theory has often relied on gender essentialism, employing the category of "women's experience" to represent all women. By doing so, feminist theory makes universalizing and normalizing claims that reflect the realities of white, Western, heterosexual, cisgender, and middle- or upper-class women, while implying these experiences are universal to all women. In a 2004 article, Alison Stone argues that women are not a group because they share the same characteristic; they are a group because the category of "women's experience" relates to the evolving history of defining femininity.

In 1993, Patrice DiQuinzio wrote that critics of exclusion argue that this issue stems from feminist theory's focus on theorizing women's experiences solely through the lens of gender. Addressing this, some propose adopting an intersectional framework, which considers the interconnected experiences of race, class, gender, and sexuality.

=== Post-structuralist critique ===
Post-structuralism enables a critique of gender essentialism by fostering analyses, critiques, and political interventions, expanding the political imagination for feminism beyond traditional constraints. As articulated by Judith Butler, post-structuralism refers to "a field of critical practices that cannot be totalized and that, therefore, interrogate the formative and exclusionary power of sexual difference." Post-structural feminism does not represent a fixed position but rather provides tools and concepts that can be "reused and rethought, exposed as strategic instruments and effects, and subjected to critical reinscription and redeployment." However, critics such as Susan Bordo suggest that Butler is reducing gender to language and abstraction.

Recent scholarship further links gender essentialism to contemporary "anti-gender" mobilizations. In a 2025 GLQ conversation, Judith Butler argues that assertions of an immutable male/female binary are sustained by "phantasmatic" narratives (such as moral panics about protecting children) that convert historically contingent social practices into purported natural facts. Butler reframes sex assignment as a material, institutional process—legal, medical, and linguistic—that is reiterated over time, challenging essentialist claims that posit biological sex as a pre-interpretive foundation for gender. This analysis extends post-structuralist critiques by situating essentialist appeals within broader attacks on universities and liberal democracy, while emphasizing coalitionary, anti-authoritarian responses.

== The constructionist alternative ==
The main alternative to gender essentialism is the theory of the social construction of gender. In contrast to gender essentialism, social constructionism views gender as created and influenced by society and culture, both of which differ according to time and place.

Theories of the social construction of gender grew out of theories in second-wave feminism in the latter half of the 20th century. However, Elizabeth Grosz states that the sex–gender distinction maintained by some constructionist feminists is still based on essentialism:

The opposition between essentialism and constructionism seems to me a false one: constructionism is inherently reliant on essentialism, for it needs to make explicit what are the raw materials of its processes of construction and these cannot themselves be constructed without the assumption of an infinite regress. The building blocks or raw materials must in some sense be essentialist. In short, constructionism ultimately implies and relies on essentialism.

Judith Butler's theory of gender performativity can be seen as a means to show "the ways in which reified and naturalized conceptions of gender might be understood as constituted and, hence, capable of being constituted differently". Butler uses the phenomenological theory of acts espoused by Edmund Husserl, Maurice Merleau-Ponty and George Herbert Mead, which seeks to explain the mundane way in which "social agents constitute social reality through language, gesture, and all manner of symbolic social sign", to create her conception of gender performativity. She begins by quoting Simone de Beauvoir's claim that "[o]ne is not born, but rather becomes, a woman."

This statement distinguishes sex from gender suggesting that gender is an aspect of identity that is gradually acquired. This distinction between sex, as the anatomical aspects of the female body, and gender, as the cultural meaning that forms the body and the various modes of bodily articulation, means that it is "no longer possible to attribute the values or social functions of women to biological necessity". Butler interprets this claim as an appropriation of the doctrine of constituting acts from the tradition of phenomenology. Butler concludes that "gender is in no way a stable identity or locus of agency from which various acts proceed; rather, it is an identity tenuously constituted in time—an identity instituted through the stylization of the body and, hence, must be understood as the mundane way in which bodily gestures, movements and enactments of various kinds constitute the illusion of an abiding gendered self".

Candace West and Sarah Fenstermaker also conceptualize gender "as a routine, methodical, and ongoing accomplishment, which involves a complex of perceptual, interactional and micropolitical activities that cast particular pursuits as expressions of manly and womanly 'natures'" in their 1995 text Doing Difference.

This does not mean that the material nature of the human body is denied, instead, it is re-comprehended as separate from the process by which "the body comes to bear cultural meanings". Therefore, the essence of gender is not natural because gender itself is not a natural fact but the outcome of the sedimentation of specific corporeal acts that have been inscribed through repetition and rearticulation over time onto the body. "If the reality of gender is constituted by the performance itself, then there is no recourse to an essential and unrealized 'sex' or 'gender' which gender performances ostensibly express".

== See also ==
- Empathizing–systemizing theory – Theory on the psychological basis of autism
- Essentialism – View that entities have identifying attributes
- Eternal feminine – Transcendental idealisation of femininity
- Feminist metaphysics – Area of philosophical inquiry
- Gendered sexuality
- Identity politics – Politics based on one's identity
- Neuroplasticity – Ability of the brain to continuously change
- Neuroscience of sex differences – Characteristics of the brain that differentiate the male brain and the female brain
- Post-structural feminism – Approach to feminism influenced by post-structuralist thought
- Sex differences in humans – Difference between males and females
- The NeuroGenderings Network – International group of researchers in neuroscience and gender studies
