= Royal Society Science Book Prize =

British annual award for science writing

The Royal Society Science Book Prize is an annual £25,000 prize awarded by the Royal Society to celebrate outstanding popular science books from around the world. It is open to authors of science books written for a non-specialist audience, and since it was established in 1988 has championed writers such as Stephen Hawking, Jared Diamond, Stephen Jay Gould and Bill Bryson. In 2015 The Guardian described the prize as "the most prestigious science book prize in Britain".

== History ==
The Royal Society established the Science Books Prize in 1988 with the aim of encouraging the writing, publishing and reading of good and accessible popular science books. Its name has varied according to sponsorship agreements.

| Years | Name | Sponsor |
|---|---|---|
| 1990 – 2000 | Rhône-Poulenc Prize for Science Books | Rhône-Poulenc |
| 2001 – 2006 | Aventis Prize for Science Books | Aventis |
| 2007 – 2010 | Royal Society Prize for Science Books | none |
| 2011 – 2015 | Royal Society Winton Prize for Science Books | Winton Group |
| 2016 – 2022 | Royal Society Insight Investment Science Book Prize | Insight Investment |
| 2023 – | Royal Society Trivedi Science Book Prize | Trivedi Foundation |

== Judging process ==
A panel of judges decides the shortlist and the winner of the Prize each year. The panel is chaired by a fellow of the Royal Society and includes authors, scientists and media personalities. The judges for the 2016 prize included author Bill Bryson, theoretical physicist Dr Clare Burrage, science fiction author Alastair Reynolds, ornithologist and science blogger GrrlScientist, and author and director of external affairs at the Science Museum Group, Roger Highfield. In 2019, the jury consisted of Sir Nigel Shadbolt, Shukry James Habib, Dorothy Koomson, Stephen McGann, and Gwyneth Williams.

All books entered for the prize must be published in English for the first time between September and October the preceding year. The winner is announced at an award ceremony and, as of 2025, receives £25,000. Each of the other shortlisted authors receives £2,500.

== Shortlisted books ==
=== 1988–2000 ===
Royal Society Prizes for Science Books winners, 1988-2000
| Year | Author | Title | Result |
|---|---|---|---|
| 1988 | British Medical Association Board of Science | Living with Risk | Winner |
| 1989 | Roger Lewin | Bones of Contention: Controversies in the Search for Human Origins | Winner |
| 1990 | Roger Penrose | The Emperor's New Mind | Winner |
| 1991 | Stephen Jay Gould | Wonderful Life: The Burgess Shale and the Nature of History | Winner |
| 1992 | Jared Diamond | The Rise and Fall of the Third Chimpanzee | Winner |
| 1993 | Steven Rose | The Making of Memory | Winner |
| 1994 | Steve Jones | The Language of the Genes | Winner |
| 1995 | John Emsley | The Consumer’s Good Chemical Guide | Winner |
| 1996 | Arno Karlen | Plague's Progress | Winner |
| 1997 | Alan Walker and Pat Shipman | The Wisdom of Bones | Winner |
| 1998 | Jared Diamond | Guns, Germs, and Steel | Winner |
| 1999 | Paul Hoffman | The Man Who Loved Only Numbers | Winner |

=== 2000–2010 ===
Royal Society Prizes for Science Books winners, 2000-2009
| Year | Author | Title | Result | Ref. |
|---|---|---|---|---|
| 2000 | Brian Greene | The Elegant Universe | Winner | |
| 2000 | Thomas Dormandy | The White Death | Finalist | |
| 2000 | John Naughton | A Brief History of the Future | Finalist | |
| 2000 | Matt Ridley | Genome | Finalist | |
| 2000 | Jonathan Weiner | Time, Love, Memory: A Great Biologist and His Quest for the Origins of Behavior | Finalist | |
| 2000 | Christopher Wills | Children of Prometheus | Finalist | |
| 2001 | Robert Kunzig | Mapping the Deep | Winner | |
| 2001 | Steve Grand | Creation: Life and How to Make It | Finalist | |
| 2001 | George Johnson | Strange Beauty | Finalist | |
| 2001 | Mark Ridley | Mendel's Demon | Finalist | |
| 2001 | Paul Strathern | Mendeleyev's Dream | Finalist | |
| 2001 | Lewis Wolpert | Malignant Sadness | Finalist | |
| 2002 | Stephen Hawking | The Universe in a Nutshell | Winner | |
| 2002 | Martin Gorst | Aeons:The Search for the Beginning of Time | Finalist | |
| 2002 | Hannah Holmes | The Secret Life of Dust | Finalist | |
| 2002 | David Horrobin | The Madness of Adam and Eve: Did Schizophrenia Shape Humanity? | Finalist | |
| 2002 | Robert M. Sapolsky | A Primate's Memoir | Finalist | |
| 2002 | Michael White | Rivals: Conflict as the Fuel of Science | Finalist | |
| 2003 | Chris McManus | Right Hand, Left Hand | Winner | |
| 2003 | Mark Buchanan | Small World | Finalist | |
| 2003 | Gerd Gigerenzer | Reckoning With Risk | Finalist | |
| 2003 | Robert P. Kirshner | The Extravagant Universe | Finalist | |
| 2003 | Steven Pinker | The Blank Slate | Finalist | |
| 2003 | Stephen Webb | Where Is Everybody? | Finalist | |
| 2004 | Bill Bryson | A Short History of Nearly Everything | Winner | |
| 2004 | Andrew Brown | In The Beginning Was the Worm | Finalist | |
| 2004 | Nigel Calder | Magic Universe | Finalist | |
| 2004 | Armand Marie Leroi | Mutants: On Genetic Variety and the Human Body | Finalist | |
| 2004 | Sue Nelson and Richard Hollingham | How to Clone the Perfect Blonde | Finalist | |
| 2004 | Matt Ridley | Nature Via Nurture | Finalist | |
| 2004 | Francis Spufford | Backroom Boys | Finalist | |
| 2005 | Philip Ball | Critical Mass: How One Thing Leads to Another | Winner | |
| 2005 | Richard Dawkins | The Ancestor's Tale | Finalist | |
| 2005 | Douwe Draaisma | Why Life Speeds Up As You Get Older | Finalist | |
| 2005 | Griffith Edwards | Matters Of Substance: Drugs - And Why Everyone's A User | Finalist | |
| 2005 | Richard Fortey | The Earth: An Intimate History | Finalist | |
| 2005 | Robert Winston | The Human Mind | Finalist | |
| 2006 | David Bodanis | Electric Universe: How Electricity Switched on the Modern World | Winner | |
| 2006 | Jared Diamond | Collapse: How Societies Choose to Fail or Succeed | Finalist | |
| 2006 | Michio Kaku | Parallel Worlds: The Science of Alternative Universes and our Future in the Cosmos | Finalist | |
| 2006 | Nick Lane | Power, Sex, Suicide: Mitochondria and the Meaning of Life | Finalist | |
| 2006 | Arthur I. Miller | Empire of the Stars: Friendship, Obsession and Betrayal in the Quest for Black Holes | Finalist | |
| 2006 | Vivienne Parry | The Truth About Hormones: What's Going on when We're Tetchy, Spotty, Fearful, Tearful or Just Plain Awful | Finalist | |
| 2007 | Daniel Gilbert | Stumbling on Happiness | Winner | |
| 2007 | Robert Henson | The Rough Guide to Climate Change | Finalist | |
| 2007 | Eric R. Kandel | In Search of Memory | Finalist | |
| 2007 | Henry Nicholls | Lonesome George | Finalist | |
| 2007 | Chris Stringer | Homo Britannicus | Finalist | |
| 2007 | Adam Wishart | One in Three | Finalist | |
| 2008 | Mark Lynas | Six Degrees: Our Future on a Hotter Planet | Winner | |
| 2008 | Stuart Clark | The Sun Kings: The Unexpected Tragedy of Richard Carrington and the Tale of How Modern Astronomy Began | Finalist | |
| 2008 | Gerd Gigerenzer | Gut Feelings | Finalist | |
| 2008 | Steve Jones | Coral: A Pessimist in Paradise | Finalist | |
| 2008 | Ian Stewart | Why Beauty is Truth: A History of Symmetry | Finalist | |
| 2008 | J. Craig Venter | A Life Decoded, My Genome: My Life | Finalist | |
| 2009 | Richard Holmes | The Age of Wonder | Winner | |
| 2009 | Avery Gilbert | What the Nose Knows | Finalist | |
| 2009 | Ben Goldacre | Bad Science | Finalist | |
| 2009 | Jo Marchant | Decoding the Heavens | Finalist | |
| 2009 | Leonard Mlodinow | The Drunkard's Walk: How Randomness Rules Our Lives | Finalist | |
| 2009 | Neil Shubin | Your Inner Fish: A Journey Into the 3.5-Billion-Year History of the Human Body | Finalist | |
| 2010 | Nick Lane | Life Ascending | Winner | |
| 2010 | Marcus Chown | We Need To Talk About Kelvin | Finalist | |
| 2010 | Brian Cox and Jeff Forshaw | Why Does E=mc2? | Finalist | |
| 2010 | Frederick Grinnell | Everyday Practice of Science: Where Intuition and Passion Meet Objectivity and Logic | Finalist | |
| 2010 | James Hannam | God's Philosophers: How the Medieval World Laid the Foundations of Modern Science | Finalist | |
| 2010 | Henry Pollack | A World Without Ice | Finalist | |

=== 2011–2019 ===
Royal Society Prizes for Science Books winners, 2010-2019
| Year | Author | Title | Result | Ref. |
|---|---|---|---|---|
| 2011 | Gavin Pretor-Pinney | The Wavewatcher's Companion | Winner | |
| 2011 | Alex Bellos | Alex's Adventures in Numberland | Finalist | |
| 2011 | Guy Deutscher | Through the Language Glass: How Words Colour Your World | Finalist | |
| 2011 | Sam Kean | The Disappearing Spoon | Finalist | |
| 2011 | Ian Sample | Massive: The Missing Particle That Sparked the Greatest Hunt in Science | Finalist | |
| 2011 | Jon Turney | The Rough Guide to The Future | Finalist | |
| 2012 | James Gleick | The Information | Winner | |
| 2012 | Joshua Foer | Moonwalking with Einstein | Finalist | |
| 2012 | Lone Frank | My Beautiful Genome | Finalist | |
| 2012 | Brian Greene | The Hidden Reality | Finalist | |
| 2012 | Steven Pinker | The Better Angels of Our Nature | Finalist | |
| 2012 | Nathan Wolfe | The Viral Storm | Finalist | |
| 2013 | Sean Carroll | The Particle at the End of the Universe | Winner | |
| 2013 | Tim Birkhead | Bird Sense | Finalist | |
| 2013 | Enrico Coen | Cells to Civilizations: The Principles of Change That Shape Life | Finalist | |
| 2013 | Charles Fernyhough | Pieces of Light: The New Science of Memory | Finalist | |
| 2013 | Caspar Henderson | The Book of Barely Imagined Beings | Finalist | |
| 2013 | Callum Roberts | Ocean of Life | Finalist | |
| 2014 | Mark Miodownik | Stuff Matters: The Strange Stories of the Marvellous Materials that Shape Our Man-made World | Winner | |
| 2014 | Philip Ball | Serving the Reich: The Struggle for the Soul of Physics under Hitler | Finalist | |
| 2014 | John Browne | Seven Elements That Have Changed The World: Iron, Carbon, Gold, Silver, Uranium, Titanium, Silicon | Finalist | |
| 2014 | Pedro G. Ferreira | The Perfect Theory: A Century of Geniuses and the Battle over General Relativity | Finalist | |
| 2014 | George Johnson | The Cancer Chronicles: Unlocking Medicine's Deepest Mystery | Finalist | |
| 2014 | Mary Roach | Gulp: Adventures on the Alimentary Canal | Finalist | |
| 2015 | Gaia Vince | Adventures in the Anthropocene: A Journey to the Heart of the Planet We Made | Winner | |
| 2015 | David Adam | The Man Who Couldn’t Stop | Finalist | |
| 2015 | Alex Bellos | Alex Through the Looking-Glass: How Life Reflects Numbers and Numbers Reflect Life | Finalist | |
| 2015 | Jon Butterworth | Smashing Physics | Finalist | |
| 2015 | Matthew Cobb | Life's Greatest Secret | Finalist | |
| 2015 | Johnjoe McFadden and Jim Al-Khalili | Life on the Edge: The Coming of Age of Quantum Biology | Finalist | |
| 2016 | Andrea Wulf | The Invention of Nature: The Adventures of Alexander von Humboldt, the Lost Hero of Science | Winner | |
| 2016 | Tim Birkhead | The Most Perfect Thing: Inside (and Outside) a Bird's Egg | Finalist | |
| 2016 | Thomas Levenson | The Hunt for Vulcan: ... and How Albert Einstein Destroyed a Planet, Discovered Relativity, and Deciphered the Universe | Finalist | |
| 2016 | Jo Marchant | Cure: A Journey Into the Science of Mind over Body | Finalist | |
| 2016 | Oliver Morton | The Planet Remade: How Geoengineering Could Change the World | Finalist | |
| 2016 | Siddhartha Mukherjee | The Gene: An Intimate History | Finalist | |
| 2017 | Cordelia Fine | Testosterone Rex: Unmaking the Myths of Our Gendered Minds | Winner | |
| 2017 | Eugenia Cheng | Beyond Infinity: An Expedition to the Outer Limits of the Mathematical Universe | Finalist | |
| 2017 | Peter Godfrey-Smith | Other Minds: The Octopus and the Evolution of Intelligent Life | Finalist | |
| 2017 | Joseph Jebelli | In Pursuit of Memory: The Fight Against Alzheimer's | Finalist | |
| 2017 | Mark O'Connell | To Be a Machine: Adventures Among Cyborgs, Utopians, Hackers, and the Futurists Solving the Modest Problem of Death | Finalist | |
| 2017 | Ed Yong | I Contain Multitudes: The Microbes Within Us and a Grander View of Life | Finalist | |
| 2018 | Sarah-Jayne Blakemore | Inventing Ourselves: The Secret Life of the Teenage Brain | Winner | |
| 2018 | Lucy Cooke | The Unexpected Truth About Animals | Finalist | |
| 2018 | Daniel M. Davis | The Beautiful Cure: Harnessing Your Body’s Natural Defences | Finalist | |
| 2018 | Hannah Fry | Hello World: How to be Human in the Age of the Machine | Finalist | |
| 2018 | Mark Miodownik | Liquid: The Delightful and Dangerous Substances That Flow Through Our Lives | Finalist | |
| 2018 | Simon Winchester | Exactly: How Precision Engineers Created the Modern World | Finalist | |
| 2019 | Caroline Criado Perez | Invisible Women: Exposing Data Bias in a World Designed for Men | Winner | |
| 2019 | John Gribbin | Six Impossible Things | Finalist | |
| 2019 | Monty Lyman | The Remarkable Life of the Skin | Finalist | |
| 2019 | Tim Smedley | Clearing the Air | Finalist | |
| 2019 | Paul Steinhardt | The Second Kind of Impossible | Finalist | |
| 2019 | Steven Strogatz | Infinite Powers | Finalist | |

=== Since 2020 ===
Royal Society Prizes for Science Books winners, 2020–present
| Year | Author | Title | Result | Ref. |
|---|---|---|---|---|
| 2020 | Camilla Pang | Explaining Humans | Winner | |
| 2020 | Jim Al-Khalili | The World According to Physics | Finalist | |
| 2020 | Bill Bryson | The Body: A Guide for Occupants | Finalist | |
| 2020 | Susannah Cahalan | The Great Pretender | Finalist | |
| 2020 | Linda Scott | The Double X Economy | Finalist | |
| 2020 | Gaia Vince | Transcendence | Finalist | |
| 2021 | Merlin Sheldrake | Entangled Life | Winner | |
| 2021 | Emily Levesque | The Last Stargazers | Finalist | |
| 2021 | James Nestor | Breath | Finalist | |
| 2021 | Jessica Nordell | The End of Bias | Finalist | |
| 2021 | Suzanne O'Sullivan | The Sleeping Beauties | Finalist | |
| 2021 | Stuart J. Ritchie | Science Fictions | Finalist | |
| 2022 | Henry Gee | A (Very) Short History of Life on Earth: 4.6 Billion Years in 12 Pithy Chapters | Winner | |
| 2022 | Nick Davidson | The Greywacke: How a Priest, a Soldier and a School Teacher Uncovered 300 Million Years of History | Finalist | |
| 2022 | Frans de Waal | Different: What Apes Can Teach Us About Gender | Finalist | |
| 2022 | Jeremy Farrar with Anjana Ahuja | Spike: The Virus vs. The People – the Inside Story | Finalist | |
| 2022 | Rose Anne Kenny | Age Proof: The New Science of Living a Longer and Healthier Life | Finalist | |
| 2022 | Peter A. Stott | Hot Air: The Inside Story of the Battle Against Climate Change Denial | Finalist | |
| 2023 | Ed Yong | An Immense World: How Animal Senses Reveal the Hidden Realms Around Us | Winner | |
| 2023 | Roma Agrawal | Nuts and Bolts: Seven Small Inventions That Changed the World (in a Big Way) | Finalist | |
| 2023 | Nicklas Brendborg, trans. by Elizabeth de Noma | Jellyfish Age Backwards: Nature's Secrets to Longevity | Finalist | |
| 2023 | Lev Parikian | Taking Flight: The Evolutionary Story of Life on the Wing | Finalist | |
| 2023 | David Quammen | Breathless: The Scientific Race to Defeat a Deadly Virus | Finalist | |
| 2023 | Kate Zernike | The Exceptions: Nancy Hopkins, MIT, and the Fight for Women in Science | Finalist | |
| 2024 | Kelly Weinersmith and Zach Weinersmith | A City on Mars: Can We Settle Space, Should We Settle Space, and Have We Really Thought This Through? | Winner | |
| 2024 | Cat Bohannon | Eve: How the Female Body Drove 200 Million Years of Human Evolution | Finalist | |
| 2024 | Tom Chivers | Everything Is Predictable: How Bayes' Remarkable Theorem Explains the World | Finalist | |
| 2024 | Kashmir Hill | Your Face Belongs to Us: The Secretive Startup Dismantling Your Privacy | Finalist | |
| 2024 | Gísli Pálsson | The Last of Its Kind: The Search for the Great Auk and the Discovery of Extinction | Finalist | |
| 2024 | Venki Ramakrishnan | Why We Die: The New Science of Ageing and the Quest for Immortality | Finalist | |
| 2025 | Masud Husain | Our Brains, Our Selves: What a Neurologist's Patients Taught Him About the Brain | Winner | |
| 2025 | Neil Shubin | Ends of the Earth: Journeys to the Polar Regions in Search of Life, the Cosmos, and our Future | Finalist | |
| 2025 | Daniel Levitin | Music as Medicine: How We Can Harness Its Therapeutic Power | Finalist | |
| 2025 | Simon Parkin | The Forbidden Garden of Leningrad: A True Story of Science and Sacrifice in a City under Siege | Finalist | |
| 2025 | Sadiah Qureshi | Vanished: An Unnatural History of Extinction | Finalist | |
| 2025 | Tim Minshall | Your Life is Manufactured: How We Make Things, Why It Matters and How We Can Do It Better | Finalist | |
| 2026 | Kit Chapman | The Age of Alchemy: The Secret History of Chemistry From Ancient Magic to Modern Science | Winner | |
| 2026 | Rose George | Every Last Fish: A Deep Dive Into Everything They Do for Us and We Do to Them | Finalist | |
| 2026 | Lise Barnéoud, translated by Bronwyn Haslam | Hidden Guests: Migrating Cells and How the New Science of Microchimerism Is Redefining Human Identity | Finalist | |
| 2026 | Steve Ramirez | How To Change a Memory: One Neuroscientist’s Quest To Alter the Past | Finalist | |
| 2026 | Deborah Cohen | Bad Influence: How the Internet Hijacked Our Health | Finalist | |
| 2026 | Fred Pearce | Despite It All: A Handbook for Climate Hopefuls | Finalist | |
