= Parakaryon =

- Drawing showing unique cell structure with cell wall, single nuclear membrane, and 3 endosymbionts (seen in section), a combination found neither in prokaryotes nor eukaryotes. Cell is 10 μm long.

Scientific classification
- Domain: incertae sedis
- Genus: Parakaryon; Yamaguchi et al. 2012
- Species: P. myojinensis

Binomial name
- Parakaryon myojinensis Yamaguchi et al. 2012

Unique single-celled organism of uncertain taxonomy

Location of Myōjin Knoll off the coast of Japan, where the specimen was found

Parakaryon myojinensis, also known as the Myojin parakaryote, is a highly unusual species of single-celled organism known only from a single specimen, described in 2012. It has features of both prokaryotes and eukaryotes but is apparently distinct from either group, making it unique among all other organisms discovered thus far. It is the sole species in the genus Parakaryon.

== Etymology ==
The generic name Parakaryon comes from Greek παρά (pará, "beside", "beyond", "near") and κάρυον (káryon, "nut", "kernel", "nucleus"), and reflects its distinction from eukaryotes and prokaryotes. The specific name myojinensis reflects the locality where the only sample was collected: from the bristle of a unidentified scale worm collected from hydrothermal vents at Myōjin Knoll (明神海丘, 32°06.2′N 139°52.1′E), about 1,240 metres (4,070 ft) deep in the Pacific Ocean, near Aogashima island, southeast of the Japanese archipelago. The authors explain the full binomial as "next to (eu)karyote from Myojin".

== Structure ==
Parakaryon myojinensis has some structural features unique to eukaryotes, some features unique to prokaryotes, and some features different from both. The table below details these structures, with matching traits coloured beige.

Structure	Prokaryotes	Eukaryotes	P. myojinensis
Nucleus present	No	Yes	Nucleoid with 1 membrane
No. of nuclear membrane layers	—N/a	2	1
Nuclear pores present	—N/a	Yes	No
Ribosome location	Cytoplasmic	Cytoplasmic	Cytoplasmic and intranuclear
Endosymbionts present	No	Yes (Mitochondria & Chloroplasts which are Plastids)	Yes
Endoplasmic reticulum present	No	Yes	No
Golgi apparatus present	No	Yes	No
Mitochondria present	No	Usually	No
Chromosome structure	Variable	Linear	Filamentous
Cytoskeleton present	Yes	Yes	No

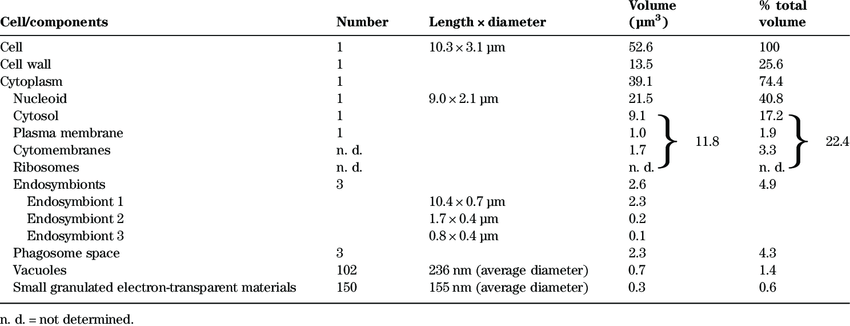
The numbers, sizes and volumes of all cell components in P. myojinensis

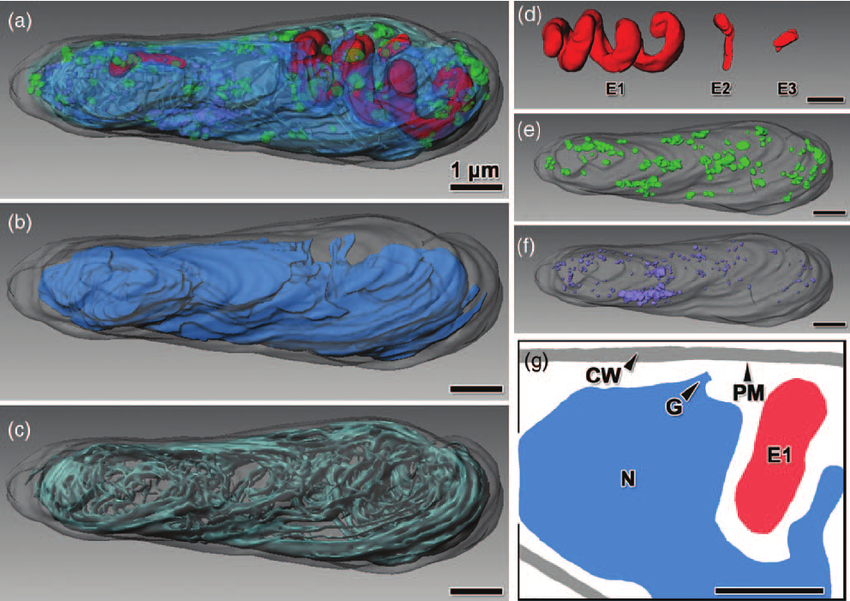
The three-dimensional reconstruction of P. myojinensis. (a) The whole cell. (b) The 'nucleoid'. (c) The cytomembrane system of the host cell. (d) The endosymbionts. (e) The distribution of vacuoles in the host cell. (f ) The distribution of the small granulated electron-transparent materials in the host cell. (g) Trace images of Fig. 3i showing how the nucleoid region (N) was defined by the inner most cytomembrane (nucleoid membrane) and smallest distance bridging the gaps (G). For 360° perspectives

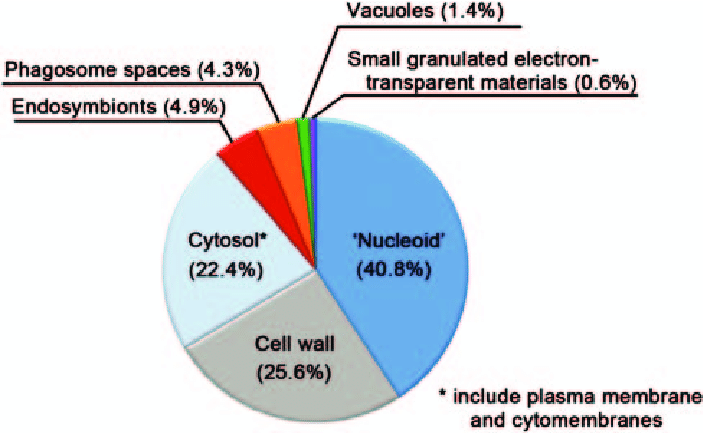
The volumetric proportions of the cell components in P. myojinensis.

== Interpretations ==
=== Genuine species or artifact ===
Yamaguchi et al. proposed in their 2012 paper that there were three reasons why the specimen they named P. myojinensis was not simply a result of parasitic or predatory bacteria living within another prokaryote host, which they acknowledged is known from several examples:

1. "It is difficult to imagine that multiple bacteria of different species attacked a host at the same time." They referred to Figure 2d, showing the isolated forms of the inclusions, one large helix with three turns (volume 2.3 μm³) and two much smaller pieces (volumes 0.2 & 0.1 μm³).
2. "Secondly, because the cytoplasms of the host and the endosymbionts show orderly and electron-dense cellular structures, no digestion in either host or endosymbionts appears to have occurred."
3. "Lastly, if Parakaryon myojinensis originated due to a current interaction between predators and hosts, then there must be dense populations of predators and hosts, because predators need to find hosts quickly for survival once they are released from the previous host."

In 2016, Yamaguchi et al. detailed the discovery of helical bacteria on polychaetes collected from the same location, which they named "Myojin spiral bacteria". In 2020, Yamaguchi and two others published a new short paper on their studies of the microbiota of polychaetes from Myojin Knoll. The authors stated "Among them, we often observed bacteria that contained intracellular bacteria on ultrathin sections." They studied one such specimen and concluded that the "host" bacterium was dead and its cell wall broken. The smaller bacteria could have been feeding on the larger bacterium but they also suggest "The association of the bacteria with dead bacteria could also have been artificially caused by the centrifugation steps used for the preparation of specimens for electron microscopy." In this paper, all five mentions of P. myojinensis were as a valid taxon with no implication that it is an artifact.

=== Evolutionary significance ===
It is not clear whether P. myojinensis can or should be classified as a eukaryote or a prokaryote, the two categories to which all other cellular life belongs. Adding to the difficulties of classification, only one instance of this organism has been discovered to date, and so scientists have been unable to study it further. Its discoverers suggested that additional specimens would be needed for culturing and DNA sequencing to place the organism in a phylogenetic context.

British evolutionary biochemist Nick Lane hypothesized in a 2015 book that the existence of P. myojinensis could be the first known example of symbiogenesis outside eukaryotes, which could offer clues to the requirements for the development of complex life in general.

== See also ==
- Anatoma fujikurai, a species of sea snail discovered at the same location
- Eukaryogenesis
