= A Mind of Its Own: How Your Brain Distorts and Deceives =

Book by Cordelia Fine

- Author: Cordelia Fine
- Language: English
- Publisher: W.W. Norton & Company
- Publication date: 2005
- Publication place: United States
- Pages: 224
- ISBN: 0-393-06213-9

A Mind of Its Own: How Your Brain Distorts and Deceives is the first book written by Cordelia Fine, published in 2005 by W.W. Norton & Company. It is made of eight chapters that explore how the brain distorts reality and exhibits biased thinking.

In The Quarterly Review of Biology, Massimo Pigliucci described the book as "a short and sensible manual for its [the brain's] proper care and usage". Richard Lipkin also reviewed A Mind of Its Own in Scientific American Mind.

A Mind of Its Own was longlisted for the Royal Society Prizes for Science Books General Prize in 2007.
