= Anatoma fujikurai =

Scientific classification
- Kingdom: Animalia
- Phylum: Mollusca
- Class: Gastropoda
- Subclass: Vetigastropoda
- Order: Lepetellida
- Family: Anatomidae
- Genus: Anatoma
- Species: A. fujikurai

Binomial name
- Anatoma fujikurai Sasaki, Geiger & Okutani, 2010

Species of gastropod

Anatoma fujikurai is a species of small sea snail, a marine gastropod mollusc or micromollusc in the family Anatomidae.

== Distribution ==
It was found at a hydrothermal vent field in Myōjin Knoll caldera, Izu-Ogasawara Arc, Japan.

== See also ==
- Parakaryon myojinensis, a highly unusual single-celled organism discovered at the same location
