= Arno Karlen =

American poet, psychoanalyst, and popular science writer (1937 – 2010)

- Born: Arno Chanoch Karlen; May 7, 1937; Philadelphia, Pennsylvania, U.S.
- Died: May 13, 2010 (aged 73); Greenwich Village, New York City, U.S.
- Occupations: Writer, poet, psychoanalyst, therapist
- Spouse: Frances Lapidus (m. 1960; div. 1969)
- Relatives: Jonathan Karlen (grandson)
- Writing career
- Notable works: Sexuality and Homosexuality, The Biography of a Germ, Plague's Progress: A Social History of Man and Disease

Arno Chanoch Karlen (May 7, 1937 – May 13, 2010) was an American poet, psychoanalyst, and popular science writer. He won the 1996 Rhone-Poulenc Prize for science books with Plague's Progress.

== Early life and education ==
Arno Karlen was born on May 7, 1937, in Philadelphia, Pennsylvania, the younger of two sons, to Herman Morris Karlen (1902–1990), proprietor of a book store, and Bertha Karlen (née Milner). Both his parents had an Ashkenazi Jewish background. His father was born in Putnam, Connecticut to Russian parents, whilst his mother was born in present-day Ukraine. The family name was originally Karpilow and has been anglicized to Karlen. He had a brother, Mark Karlen.

He was a talented child who was promoted two grades and finished high school at 15. As a teenager, he was interested in literature, science, and classical music. He studied music, and graduated from Antioch College with majors in English and French literature.

== Academic career ==
After he finished college, Karlen wrote for many magazines and spent a couple of years traveling around Europe writing about food and culture. Eventually, he became editor of several magazines, including Holiday and Newsweek, and published a short stories book called White Apples at the age of 24.

In the 1970s, Karlen became an Associate Professor in the English Department Writing Program at Penn State University. In the coming years he wrote books in fields of history, medicine, and science. He then returned to New York as executive editor of Penthouse and Physicians World magazines.

In the 1990s, Karlen achieved a doctorate in sexology while studying for three years at an institute of psychoanalysis. Karlen won the 1996 Rhone-Poulenc Prize for science books with Plague's Progress, but did not attend the award ceremony due to illness. In the ten years before his death, Karlen worked as a psychotherapist and kept writing articles and publishing books.

== Personal life ==
In 1960, Karlen married Frances "Fran" Lapidus, whom he divorced in 1969. They had two sons;

== Work ==
=== Notable works ===
- Sexuality and Homosexuality (1972)
- Huneker and Other Lost Arts.
- The MacGregor Syndrome and Other Literary Losses
- Napoleon's Glands and Other Ventures in Biohistory (1984)
- UK: Plague's Progress: A Social History of Man and Disease; US: Man and microbes: disease and plagues in history and modern times (1996)
- The Biography of a Germ (2000)

=== The Biography of a Germ ===
Karlen's book tracks the friends, foes and ancestors of Borrelia burgdorferi (Bb), a "silvery, wriggling corkscrew-like" bacterium which causes Lyme disease. Asides include the naming of living things and the history of germ theory. Bb is named after Willy Burgdorfer who isolated the cause of an illness affecting residents of Lyme, Connecticut.
