= Monty Lyman =

British doctor and author

- Born: October 1992 (age 33)
- Scientific career
- Institutions: Lincoln College, Oxford, Oxford Health NHS Foundation Trust
- Website: www.montylyman.com

Monty Lyman (born October 1992) is a British doctor and author.

== Career ==
Lyman is a medical doctor, a member of the Royal College of Psychiatrists, and research fellow at the University of Oxford.

=== Books ===
His first book, The Remarkable Life of the Skin is described by his publisher (Transworld, Penguin Random House) as "the first popular science book to explore our most overlooked organ in all its physical, psychological and social glory". It was published in July 2019. The book was a Sunday Times ‘Must Read’, one of their ‘Best Books of 2019’, and chosen as a BBC Radio 4 Book of the Week.

Lyman's second book, The Painful Truth, was published in July 2021 and quickly became a Top 10 bestseller of all books sold on Amazon.

His third book, The Immune Mind, was his second to feature as BBC Radio 4's 'Book of the Week' in May 2024.

=== Awards and nominations ===
The Remarkable Life of the Skin was shortlisted for the 2019 Royal Society Science Book Prize. Aged 26 at the time, Lyman remains the youngest shortlisted author in the prize’s 38-year history.

While the Wellcome Book Prize paused in 2019, The Remarkable Life of the Skin won the public vote in the unofficial but Wellcome-endorsed #NotTheWellcomePrize.

Lyman’s essay based on The Painful Truth won the 2020 Royal Society of Medicine's Pain Medicine prize.

The Immune Mind won the 2024 British Psychological Society Book Award.

=== Media ===
Lyman has appeared on TV (BBC Breakfast, BBC Morning Live), radio (including BBC Inside Science and BBC World Service), and on podcasts (such as BBC science focus), and has been a keynote speaker at national and international conferences. Lyman has also written articles for newspapers (including The Guardian) and literary journals (for example, Literary Hub).

== Personal life ==
He lives in Oxford, England.

== Published works ==
Book	Year	Published	Other
The Remarkable Life of the Skin	2019	Transworld (Penguin Random House)	ISBN 9781784163525
The Painful Truth	2021	Transworld (Penguin Random House)	ISBN 9781529176506
The Immune Mind	2024	Transworld (Penguin Random House)	ISBN 978-1911709169
Research Methods in Psychiatry (Chapter)	2025	Cambridge University Press	ISBN 9781009028967
