= Lindsay Stern =

American fiction writer

- Education: Amherst College, University of Iowa, Yale University
- Writing career
- Genre: Fiction
- Website: www.lindsayoconnorstern.com

Lindsay Stern is an American writer and essayist. She is the author of the novel The Study of Animal Languages and the novella Town of Shadows.

== Education ==
Stern received a B.A. in English and Philosophy at Amherst College. She graduated with an M.F.A in fiction from the Iowa Writers' Workshop and began a Ph.D. in Comparative Literature at Yale University.

== Literary career ==
Stern published Town of Shadows with Scrambler Books in 2012. She wrote the book while at Amherst College.

Her debut full-length novel, The Study of Animal Languages, was published by Viking in 2019. It follows two professors in a New England campus who are married to each other.

Kirkus Reviews wrote: "Stern’s brittle comedy of highfalutin intellectual theories evolves into a feeling portrait of a gifted man coming face to face with his limitations." Publishers Weekly suggested in a mixed review that the "intellectually teeming prose makes for a thought-provoking novel, though it’s more successful asking questions such as, 'Can voles experience heartbreak?' than depicting people breaking each other’s hearts."

Booklist called it a "jittery, intelligent. . . depiction of relationships in which the parties involved experience a distressing inability to communicate." The New York Journal of Books wrote: "Though she often depends on facile academic stereotypes, Stern reveals the ways in which scientists may try to deploy objective methods, but are ultimately human."

For Washington Independent Review of Books, "What pulls The Study of Animal Languages toward its unexpectedly satisfactory conclusion (though not a by-the-book happy ending) is a series of false steps that require Prue and Ivan to face inner truths that neither character had thought silently to themselves, let alone proclaimed aloud to each other."

Stern writes for Smithsonian Magazine.

== Bibliography ==
- Town of Shadows (Scribler Books, 2012)
- The Study of Animal Languages (Viking, 2019)
