= Eve (Bohannon book) =

2023 book by Cat Bohannon

Eve: How the Female Body Drove 200 Million Years of Human Evolution
- Author: Cat Bohannon
- Language: English
- Subject: Human evolution
- Publisher: Penguin Random House
- Publication date: October 3, 2023
- Pages: 624
- ISBN: 9780385350549

Eve: How the Female Body Drove 200 Million Years of Human Evolution is a 2023 non-fiction book about human evolution written by American writer Cat Bohannon. She holds a Ph.D. in English and Comparative Literature.

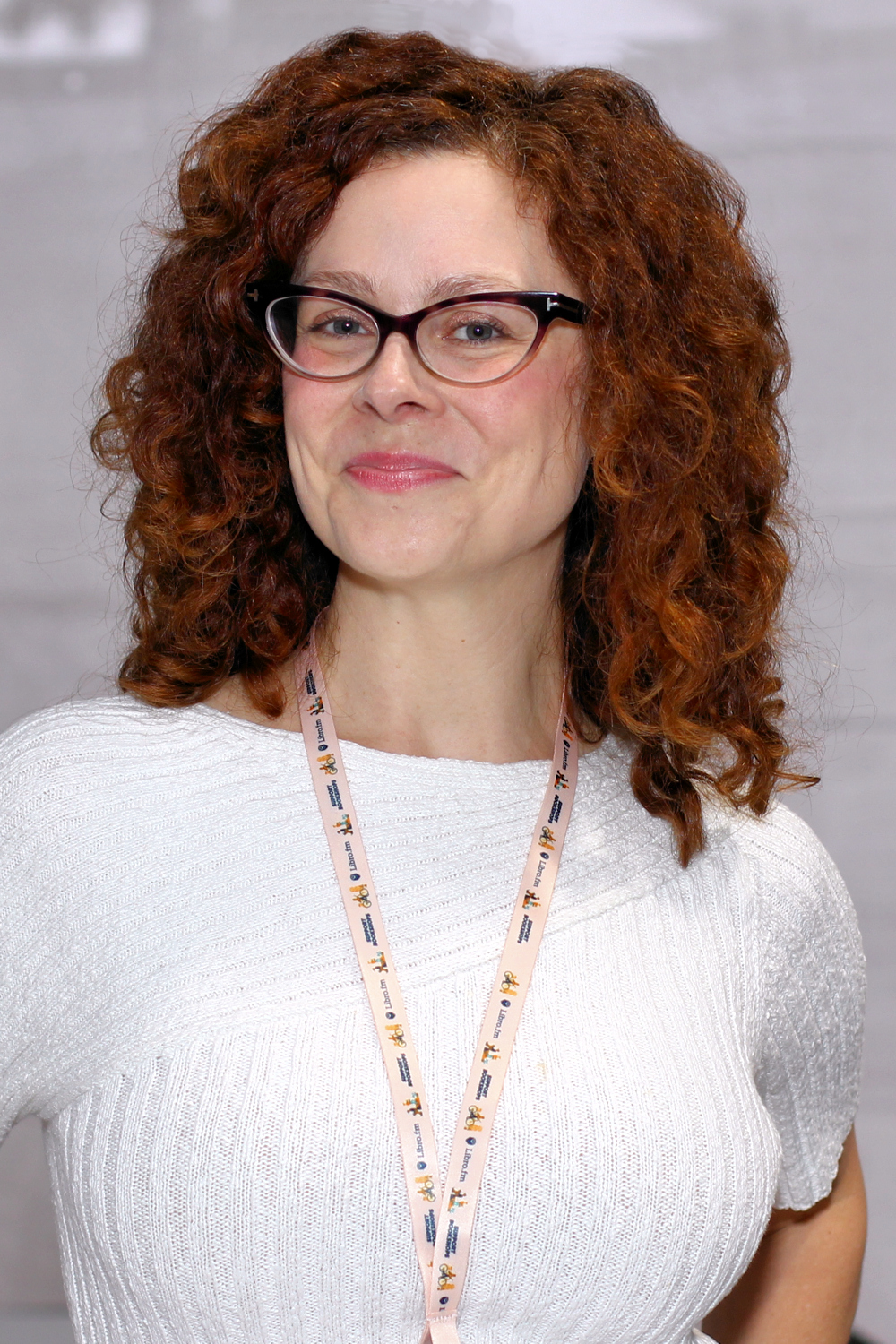
Cat Bohannon

The book explores how women's biology shaped human history and culture. One claim in the book is that when it comes to biological and medical research and clinical drug trials women's bodies have long been overlooked because males have fewer "complicating" factors such as the estrous cycle.

== Awards and accolades ==
The book won Foyles Non-Fiction Book of the Year in December 2023. In a review published in The Guardian, scientist Kate Womersley called the book "long overdue". Writing for The New York Times, Sarah Lyall concluded the book was "engaging, playful, erudite, discursive and rich with detail". In the same paper, Cindi Leive wrote in her review that the book "makes a powerful argument for the pivotal role female Homo sapiens have played in making us human".

In October 2023 the book was listed on The New York Times Best Seller list. It was shortlisted in 2024 for both the Orwell Prize for Political Writing and the Royal Society Trivedi Science Book Prize. In 2024 the book was Longlisted for Women's Prize for Non-Fiction.
