= Linda M. Scott =

American management academic

Linda M. Scott (born 1952) is an American management academic and gender consultant. An expert on women's economic development, she is Emeritus DP World Professor of Entrepreneurship and Innovation at the University of Oxford.

== Life ==
Scott grew up in Texas before studying American literature and history at the University of Texas at Austin. She gained an MBA from the Cox School of Business at Southern Methodist University and a PhD in communications from the University of Texas at Austin.

Scott held academic appointments in advertising, art, women's studies and communications at the University of Illinois. In 2006 she joined the Saïd Business School at Oxford University.

Scott's blog, The Double X Economy, focusses on the global economy of women – as investors, donors, workers and consumers – in both the developed and developing world. She also blogs on gender issues for the World Economic Forum, Forbes, and Bloomberg Businessweek. In 2013 she founded Power Shift, the Oxford Forum for Women in the World Economy, curating annual themed programmes for the forum in Oxford and Georgetown University until 2016. Prospect selected Scott as one of the Top 25 Global Thinkers in 2014 and 2015.

In her 2020 book The Double X Economy, Scott argues that enabling equal economic participation by women would "put a stop to some of the world's costliest evils, while building prosperity for everyone". She blames prejudice and bigotry among economists, governments and supernational organizations for ignoring the economic case for change. The book was shortlisted for the 2020 Royal Society Prizes for Science Books and longlisted for the 2020 Financial Times and McKinsey Business Book of the Year Award.

== Works ==
- (ed. with Rajeev Batra) Persuasive imagery: a consumer response perspective. Mahwah, N.J. : Lawrence Erlbaum Associates, 2003.
- Fresh lipstick : redressing fashion and feminism. New York: Palgrave Macmillan, 2005.
- (ed. with Diego Rinallo and Pauline MacIaran) Consumption and spirituality. New York: Routledge, 2012.
- (ed. with Russell W Belk and Søren Askegaard) Research in consumer behavior, Vol. 14. Bingley, U.K.: Emerald, 2012.
- (with Alan Bradshaw) Advertising Revolution: the story of a song, from Beatles hit to Nike slogan. London: Repeater, 2018.
- The Double X Economy: The Epic Potential of Empowering Women. Faber, 2020.
- The Cost of Sexism: How the economy is built for men and why we must reshape it. Faber, 2022.
