= Stuart J. Ritchie =

Scottish psychologist and intelligence researcher

Stuart Ritchie
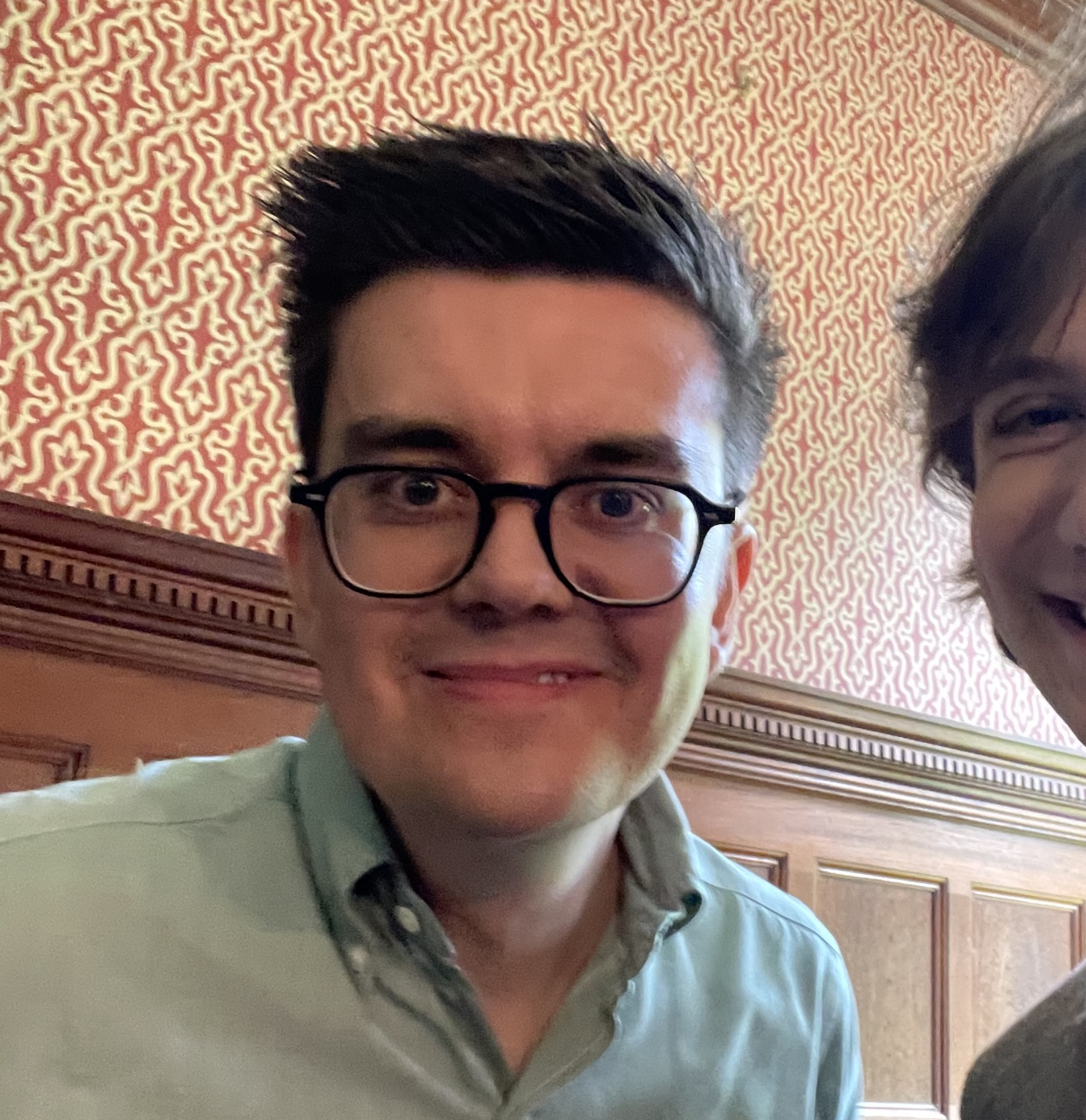
- Ritchie in 2024
- Born: Stuart James Ritchie
- Education: University of Edinburgh
- Known for: Research on human intelligence
- Scientific career
- Fields: Psychology
- Institutions: King's College London; Anthropic
- Thesis: Studies concerning the application of psychological science to education (2014)
- Doctoral advisors: Sergio Della Sala; Robert McIntosh

Stuart James Ritchie is a Scottish psychologist and science communicator known for his research in human intelligence. He works at the artificial intelligence research company Anthropic.

== Career ==
Ritchie formerly served as a lecturer at the Institute of Psychiatry, Psychology and Neuroscience at King's College London since the summer of 2018. He was previously active in researching intelligence as a postdoctoral researcher at the University of Edinburgh. In 2021, his book Science Fictions was nominated for the £25,000 Royal Society Prize for Science Books but lost to Merlin Sheldrake's Entangled Life. Ritchie wrote a newsletter titled Science Fictions for the newspaper i (on Substack prior to 2023) which, like his book of the same name, focused on scientific controversies and bias and fraud in scientific research.

Since 2023, he has co-hosted a weekly podcast called The Studies Show with science writer Tom Chivers, where they discuss the studies behind controversial scientific issues.

== Publications ==
- Intelligence: All That Matters (2016, part of Teach Yourself's All That Matters series)
- Science Fictions: How Fraud, Bias, Negligence, and Hype Undermine the Search for Truth (2020)
