= Smithsonian (magazine) =

Magazine published by the Smithsonian Institution

- Cover of the December 2024 issue
- Categories: History, science, arts, nature
- Frequency: Monthly
- Total circulation: 971,400 (2024)
- First issue: April 1970; 56 years ago
- Company: Smithsonian Institution
- Country: United States
- Based in: Washington, D.C., U.S.
- Language: English
- Website: smithsonianmag.com
- ISSN: 0037-7333
- OCLC: 1359769

Smithsonian is a magazine covering science, history, art, popular culture and innovation. The first issue was published in 1970.

== History ==
The history of Smithsonian began when Edward K. Thompson, the retired editor of Life magazine, was asked by then-Secretary of the Smithsonian, S. Dillon Ripley, to produce a magazine "about things in which the Smithsonian [Institution] is interested, might be interested or ought to be interested."

Thompson described his editorial philosophy for the new magazine as aiming to stimulate curiosity among interested readers. He said that the magazine would consider history according to its relevance to contemporary issues, present art using high-quality reproductions, and cover social progress, science, and technology to anticipate future developments. He also intended to recruit leading writers and photographers, drawing a comparison to the standards of Life.

In 1973, the magazine turned a profit for the first time. By 1974, circulation had nearly quadrupled, to 635,000, and it reached the one million milestone in 1975—one of the most successful launches of its time. In 1980, Thompson was replaced by Don Moser, who had also worked at Life. Circulation later exceeded two million during the tenure of subsequent editor, Carey Winfrey, upon his retirement in 2001. Michael Caruso succeeded Carey Winfrey in 2011, and served as editor-in-chief until 2019. Since that time Debra Rosenberg and Terence Monmaney have been editors.

== Events held ==
=== Smithsonian American Ingenuity Awards ===
From 2012 until 2019, the magazine sponsored the American Ingenuity Awards, a recognition of innovation in the arts, sciences and technology. Winners have included Bryan Stevenson, Elon Musk, Lin-Manuel Miranda, OK Go, John Krasinski, Dave Eggers, Aziz Ansari, Rosanne Cash, Jeff Bezos, Fred Armisen, Bill Hader and David Lynch.

Presenters have included Stephen Hawking (twice), Stephen Colbert, David Byrne, Herbie Hancock, Erin Brockovich, Ruben Blades, Bill Nye, Art Spiegelman, and Senator Al Franken. The American Ingenuity Award was created by the artist Jeff Koons.

=== Museum Day ===
Smithsonian arranged Museum Day, alternatively Smithsonian Day, when museums in all 50 U.S. states offered limited free admission. In 2018, over 1,400 museums participated.

The program included a free admission for one ticket holder and a guest at participating museums. The intention was for one ticket per person in contrast to the International Museum Day, when participating museums generally offer entirely free admission throughout the day.

In 2023 and 2024, the event was cancelled with no further explanation. As of 2025 the web landing page redirects to the home page of the museum.

== Contributors ==
Notable past and current contributors to Smithsonian have included:

- Richard Conniff
- Frank Deford
- Eileen Gunn
- Penn Jillette
- Jon Krakauer
- Jill Lepore
- Franz Lidz
- Alan Lightman
- Jo Marchant
- David McCullough
- Susan Orlean
- Nathaniel Philbrick
- Paul Theroux
- Lindsay Stern
- Elizabeth Royte
- Bruce Watson (writer)
