= Testosterone Rex =

2017 book

Testosterone Rex: Myths of Sex, Science, and Society
- Cover of the first edition
- Author: Cordelia Fine
- Language: English
- Subject: biological sex, gender identity, human behavior, evolution, social construction of gender, gender roles
- Publisher: W.W. Norton & Company
- Publication date: January 2017
- Publication place: United States
- Pages: 266
- ISBN: 9780393082081
- OCLC: 951070706

Testosterone Rex: Myths of Sex, Science, and Society is the third book written by Cordelia Fine, published in January 2017 by W.W. Norton & Company. Fine discusses the heavy emphasis our current society has put on biological sex and why this is a motivation for this book. Fine goes on to define what 'Testosterone Rex' is and why the idea should be extinct.

== Content ==
Testosterone Rex is composed of three parts made up of eight chapters. Each chapter begins with an anecdote related to Fine's life and to the topic of sex and gender.

Part one, titled "Past," discusses the history of sex and gender and how scientists developed the idea of the gender binary of female and male through the scope of evolution. Fine argues that the idea of humans being naturally male or female arose from this evolutionary research and begins to construct her arguments against it by discussing the research.

In part two, "Present," Fine reviews the current scientific consensus that contributes to the ideas separating the concepts of sex and gender identities in society. She begins with a discussion about genetics and hormones and argues that there are flaws in the use of those as metrics to label a person as male or female because some people do not fit neatly in either category due to intersex conditions, etc. Fine goes on to talk about the emphasis current society has put on the primary male sex hormone testosterone and how that emphasis currently relates to males and the behavior males exhibit.

Part three, "Future," goes into more detail about some of the issues that are affecting the forward movement of society because of its ideas around testosterone.

== Reception ==
Annie Murphy Paul's review in The New York Times was positive. Paul goes through major arguments and anecdotes recounted in the book, commenting with high praise, saying "again and again, Fine questions the way we think of biological sex." At the end of the review, she suggests some might find the reading to be rapid-paced and dense.

Katrina Krammer's review in Chemistry World is positive. Krammer points out that the book is humorous, which, she says, is a surprise because of the book's serious topics and well-formed arguments. The reviewer believes that the book is written in an accessible language 'free of jargon' which makes the book understandable by people without a scientific background.

Mel Rumble of the New Scientist gave a neutral review of the book. Rumble focuses more on the arguments around the experiments Fine talks about and the flaws she discusses in those experiments. Rumble believes that Fine is making a connection between gender/testosterone ideas in science: "Ultimately, Fine leaves us clear that Testosterone Rex's old stories are unjustified. What happens next is 'a question for our values, not science', says Fine, arguing for a world where cultural and gender norms sit with evolution, genetics and hormones to take account of all the influences."

== Awards ==
- 2017 Royal Society Inside Investment Science Book Prize
