= Gaia Vince =

British journalist. broadcaster and non-fiction author

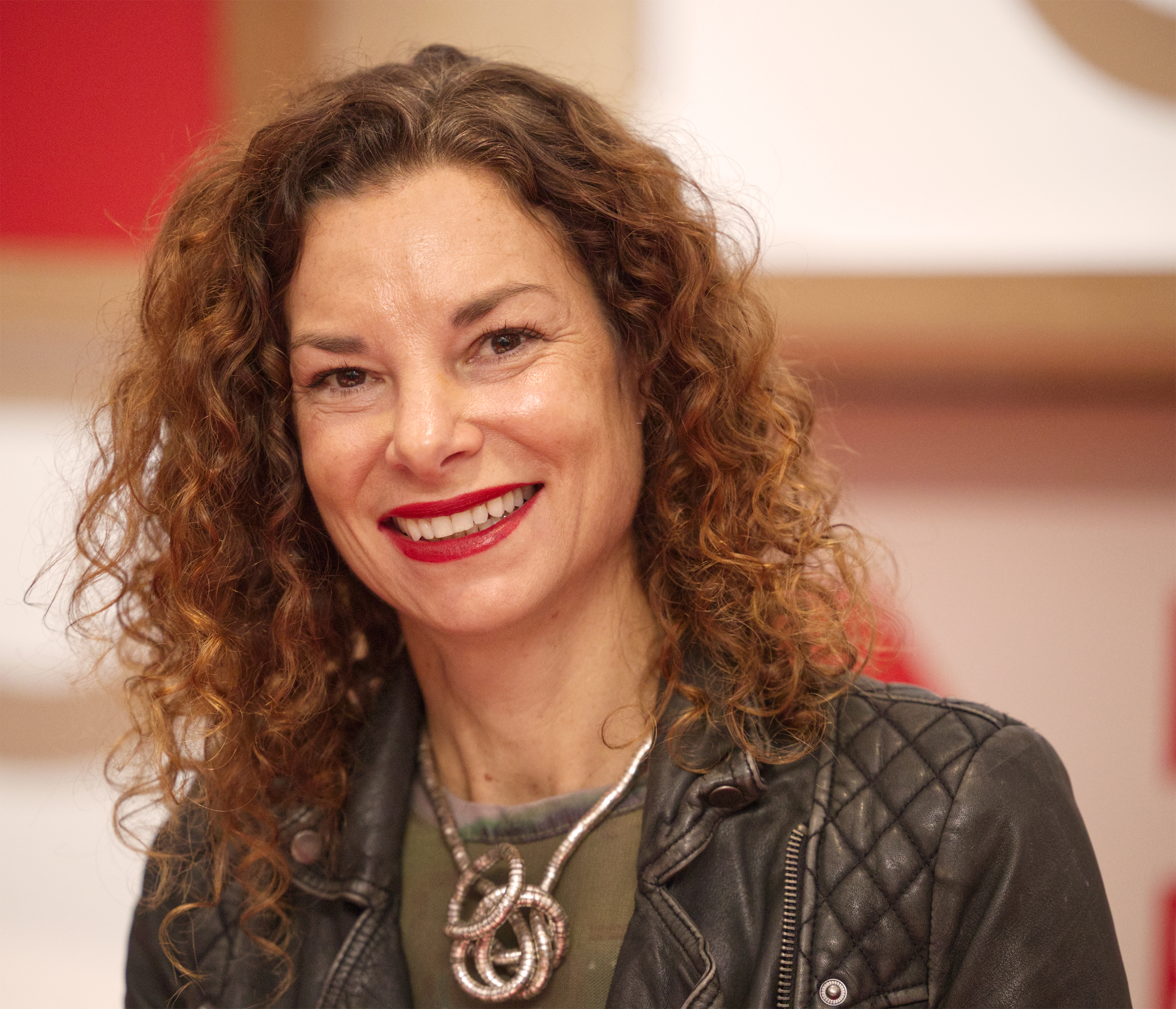
- Gaia Vince at the Frankfurt Book Fair 2023
- Born: 1973 or 1974 (age 52–53)
- Occupations: Journalist; broadcaster; author
- Awards: Royal Society Winton Prize for Science Books
- Website: www.wanderinggaia.com

Gaia Vince (born 1973 or 1974) is a freelance British environmental journalist, broadcaster and non-fiction author with British and Australian citizenship. She writes for The Guardian, and, in a column called Smart Planet, for BBC Online. She was previously news editor of Nature and online editor of New Scientist.

Her Adventures in the Anthropocene: A Journey to the Heart of the Planet We Made won the 2015 Royal Society Winton Prize for Science Books, making her the first woman to win the prize outright. The book discusses the Anthropocene, the proposed epoch that begins when human activities started to have a significant global impact on Earth's ecosystems. Her second book, Transcendence: How Humans Evolved Through Fire, Language, Beauty, and Time, was published in 2019.

In 2022, she released her third book, Nomad Century, where she argues that the coming decades will inevitably see billions of people migrate due to global heating. Vince asserts that – with the right policies – this migration can be a good thing both for the migrants and the host countries that receive them.

Vince wrote and presented a three-part Channel 4 television series Escape to Costa Rica, first broadcast in April 2017. Filmed in Costa Rica with her partner Nick Pattinson and their two young children, the series explored the country's environmental initiatives, renewable energy and sustainable development.

Vince has, on occasions, presented editions of the BBC Radio 4 programme Inside Science.

== Bibliography ==
- —— (2014). Adventures in the Anthropocene: A Journey to the Heart of the Planet We Made. Penguin Books. ISBN 9780241281116.
- —— (2019). Transcendence: How Humans Evolved Through Fire, Language, Beauty, and Time. Chatto & Windus. ISBN 9780701187347.
- —— (2022). Nomad Century. Allen Lane. ISBN 978-0241522318.
