= Philip Ball =

British science writer (born 1962)

- Born: 1962 (age 63–64)
- Education: Oxford University; Bristol University
- Occupation: Science writer
- Notable work: Critical Mass: How One Thing Leads to Another
- Website: www.philipball.co.uk

Philip Ball (born 1962) is a British science writer. For over twenty years he has been an editor of the journal Nature, for which he continues to write regularly.

He is a contributor to Prospect magazine and a columnist for Chemistry World, Nature Materials, and BBC Future.

== Biography ==
Ball has a degree in chemistry from Oxford and a PhD in physics from the University of Bristol. He has also been awarded an honorary Doctor of Letters degree in 2009, again from Bristol.

Ball's 2004 book Critical Mass: How One Thing Leads to Another won the 2005 Aventis Prize for Science Books. It examines a wide range of topics including the business cycle, random walks, phase transitions, bifurcation theory, traffic flow, Zipf's law, Small world phenomenon, catastrophe theory, the Prisoner's dilemma. The overall theme is one of applying modern mathematical models to social and economic phenomena.

In 2010, Ball published The Music Instinct in which he discusses how we make sense of sound and music and emotion. He outlines what is known and unknown about the emotional impact of music, and why it seems indispensable to humanity. He has since argued that music is emotively powerful due to its ability to mimic humans and through setting up expectations in pitch and harmony and then violating them.

Ball has written a research review on organism-centered evolution. He has contributed to publications ranging from New Scientist to The New York Times, The Guardian, the Financial Times, and New Statesman. In June 2004 he presented a three-part serial on nanotechnology, Small Worlds, on BBC Radio 4.

== Awards ==
Ball's Critical Mass: How One Thing Leads to Another won the 2005 Royal Society Winton Prize for Science Books. His book Serving the Reich: The Struggle for the Soul of Physics under Hitler was on the shortlist for the 2014 prize.

Ball was awarded the Physics World Book of the Year 2018 for his book Beyond Weird: Why Everything You Thought You Knew About Quantum Physics Is Different.

In 2019 Ball won the Kelvin Medal and Prize.

Ball's article "Should scientists run the country" won the 2022 award from the Association of British Science Writers for the best opinion piece. He was also awarded the Royal Society's 2022 Wilkins-Bernal-Medawar Medal for excellence in a subject relating to the history of science, philosophy of science or the social function of science.

In 2023, Ball was awarded the Special CSS award, an award "granted by the society to distinguished personalities who, through their activity in society in general, contributed in some way to the development of the field of complex systems."

== Selected publications ==
- Designing the Molecular World: Chemistry at the Frontier (1994), ISBN 0-691-00058-1
- Made to Measure: New Materials for the 21st Century (1997), ISBN 0-691-02733-1
- The Self-made Tapestry: Pattern Formation in Nature (1999), ISBN 0-19-850244-3
- H_{2}O: A Biography of Water (1999), ISBN 0-297-64314-2 (published in the U.S. as Life's Matrix)
- Stories of the Invisible: A Guided Tour of Molecules (2001), ISBN 0-19-280214-3 (republished as Molecules: A Very Short Introduction (2003), OUP, ISBN 978-0-19-285430-8)
- Bright Earth: The Invention of Colour (2001), ISBN 0-670-89346-3
- The Ingredients: A Guided Tour of the Elements (2002), ISBN 0-19-284100-9 (republished as The Elements: A Very Short Introduction (2004), OUP, ISBN 978-0-19-284099-8)
- Critical Mass: How One Thing Leads to Another (2004), ISBN 0-434-01135-5
- Elegant Solutions: Ten Beautiful Experiments in Chemistry (2005), ISBN 0-85404-674-7
- The Devil's Doctor: Paracelsus and the World of Renaissance Magic and Science (2006), ISBN 0-434-01134-7
- The Sun and Moon Corrupted, a novel, Portobello Books Ltd, (2008), ISBN 978-1-84627-108-3
- Universe of Stone: A Biography of Chartres Cathedral (2008), ISBN 978-0-06-115429-4
- Shapes, Nature's Patterns, a Tapestry in three Parts (2009), ISBN 978-0-19-923796-8
- Flow, Nature's Patterns, a Tapestry in three Parts (2009), ISBN 978-0-19-923797-5
- Branches, Nature's Patterns, a Tapestry in three Parts (2009), ISBN 978-0-19-923798-2
- The Music Instinct (2010), ISBN 978-1-84792-088-1
- Unnatural, The Heretical Idea of Making People (2011), ISBN 978-1-84792-152-9
- Why Society is a Complex Matter: Meeting Twenty-first Century Challenges with a New Kind of Science (2012), ISBN 978-3-642-28999-6
- Curiosity: How Science Became Interested in Everything (2013), ISBN 978-0-226-04579-5
- Serving the Reich: The Struggle for the Soul of Physics under Hitler (2014), ISBN 978-0-226-20457-4 Read an excerpt.
- Invisible: The Dangerous Allure of the Unseen (2015), University of Chicago Press, ISBN 978-0-226-23889-0; (2014), Random House
- Patterns in Nature: Why the Natural World Looks the Way It Does (2016), ISBN 978-0-226-33242-0
- The Water Kingdom: A Secret History of China (2017), ISBN 978-0-226-36920-4
- Beyond Weird: Why Everything You Thought You Knew About Quantum Physics is Different (2018), ISBN 978-1-84792-457-5
- How to Grow a Human: Adventures in Who We Are and How We Are Made (2019), ISBN 978-0-00-833178-8 ISBN 978-0-00-833177-1
- The Beauty of Chemistry: Art, Wonder, and Science (2021) ISBN 978-0-262-04441-7
- The Elements: A Visual History of Their Discovery (2021) ISBN 978-0-500-02453-9
- The Book of Minds: How to Understand Ourselves and Other Beings, from Animals to AI to Aliens (2022), ISBN 978-0-226-79587-4
- How Life Works: A User's Guide to the New Biology (2023) ISBN 978-1-5290-9599-9
- "A New Understanding of the Cell: Gloppy specks called biomolecular condensates are rewriting the story of how life works", Scientific American, vol. 332, no. 2 (February 2025), pp. 22–27. "Biomolecular condensates now seem to be a key part of how life gets its countless molecular components to coordinate and cooperate, to form committees that make the group decisions on which our very existence depends." (p. 24.)
- Alchemy: An Illustrated History of Elixirs, Experiments and the Birth of Modern Science (2025) ISBN 978-0300280876
