= Cordelia Fine =

Canadian-born British psychologist and writer

Cordelia Fine FAHA
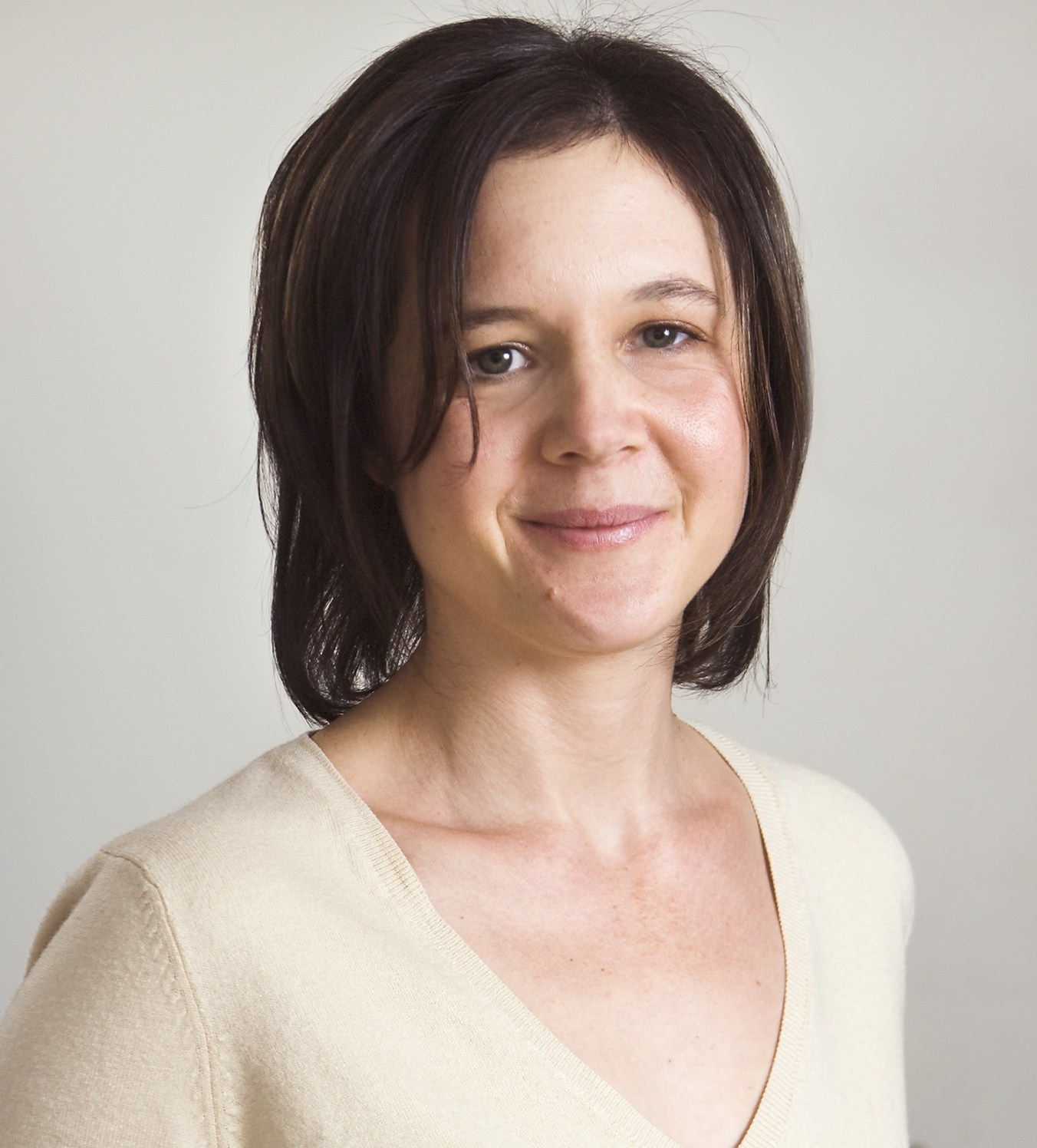
- Fine in 2010
- Born: 1975 (age 50–51); Toronto, Ontario, Canada
- Education: Oxford University (BA Hons Experimental Psychology), Cambridge University (MPhil Criminology), University College London (PhD Psychology)
- Occupations: Philosopher, psychologist, writer
- Parents: Kit Fine; Anne Fine
- Writing career
- Period: 2006–present
- Subjects: Philosophy, psychology, neuroscience
- Notable works: Testosterone Rex; A Mind of Its Own; Delusions of Gender
- Website: www.cordelia-fine.com

Cordelia Fine (born 1975) is a Canadian-born British philosopher of science, psychologist, writer, and science communicator, who lives in Australia. As of 2018 she is a full professor in the History and Philosophy of Science programme at the University of Melbourne, Australia. Fine has written several popular science books on the topics of social cognition, neuroscience, and the popular myths of sex differences. She is especially known for Testosterone Rex, which won the Royal Society Science Book Prize in 2017.

== Early life and education ==
Cordelia Fine was born in 1975 in Toronto, Canada. She is the daughter of writer Anne Fine and philosopher Kit Fine.

She was educated at St George's School for Girls in Edinburgh, Scotland. She was awarded a bachelor's degree in experimental psychology with first-class honours from Oxford University, a Master of Philosophy in criminology from Cambridge University, and a PhD in Psychology from University College London.

== Career ==
Since completing her PhD, Cordelia Fine has undertaken research at the School of Philosophy & Bioethics at Monash University; the Centre for Applied Philosophy & Public Ethics at the Australian National University; and at the Centre for Agency, Values & Ethics at Macquarie University.

From 2012 to 2016, she was an ARC Future Fellow at the Melbourne School of Psychological Sciences. She was also an associate professor in the Melbourne Business School at the University of Melbourne until 2016.

As of January 2018 Fine is a full professor in the School of Historical and Philosophical Studies at the University of Melbourne.

== Books and academic writing ==
Fine's first book, A Mind of Its Own, synthesises a large amount of cognitive research to show that the mind often gives a distorted picture of reality.

Her second book, Delusions of Gender, argues that conclusions that science has shown that men's and women's brains are intrinsically different in ways that explain the gender status quo are premature and often based on flawed methods and unexamined assumptions. She also challenges the common assumption that a gender-egalitarian society means that differences in social outcomes and interests must be due to biology. "With still such different contexts and circumstances for men and women, it's simply not possible to compare the choices they make and draw confident conclusions about the sexes' different inner natures." Fine's approach to gender has been criticised by those who think it behaviourist, and for not accounting for what psychiatry terms gender identity disorders. However, as Fine pointed out in The Psychologist, the book is concerned with scientific evidence presented as support for the idea that males and females are, on average, 'hardwired' to 'systemise' versus 'empathise', rather than the question of the extent to which core gender identity is 'hardwired'; and that she does not subscribe to a behaviourist or social determinist view of development, but rather "one in which the developmental path is constructed, step by step, out of the continuous and dynamic interaction between brain, genes and environment."

Ben Barres, a professor of neurobiology at Stanford University, wrote in a review of the book for PLOS Biology that Fine's "analysis of this data should be required reading for every neurobiology student, if not every human being." The neuroscientists Margaret McCarthy and Gregory Ball have said that Fine presents a one-sided picture of the study of sex differences, and that Delusions of Gender threatened to "severely hamper" progress in this field. However, neuroscientists Geert de Vries and Nancy Forger of the Neuroscience Institute at Georgia State University cite the work of Fine and colleagues in noting that "unsubstantiated claims about the nature and function of neural sex differences continue to be made and such claims may do serious harm". Together with Barnard College sociomedical scientist Rebecca Jordan-Young, Fine has rejected the claim, based on quotations of her criticisms of popular misrepresentations of science, that she is "anti-sex differences". Fine and Jordan-Young, with other co-authors, have published recommendations and guidelines for improving the quality of scientific investigations of sex/gender differences in research.

Fine's third book, Testosterone Rex, critiques an account of sex differences and their evolutionary, neural and hormonal basis that is the prominent view in the scientific literature and research. In 2017, Testosterone Rex won the Royal Society Science Books Prize. Harriet Hall, who often critiques alternative medicine and quackery for their lack of a scientific basis, argued in the Skeptical Inquirer: "Cordelia Fine's book provides compelling evidence that men and women aren't really very different other than in their anatomy. There is no such thing as a 'male brain' or a 'female brain'. There are no essential male or female natures but rather an individualized mosaic of features. Testosterone isn't very important. Biology can't be used to explain or excuse societal inequalities."

In March 2025 she published Patriarchy Inc.: What We Get Wrong About Gender Equality and Why Men Still Win at Work.

She has also authored several academic book chapters and numerous academic publications. Fine is also noted for coining the term 'neurosexism'.

== Other activities ==
As a science communicator, Fine has given many public and keynote lectures across the education, business, academic, and public sectors.

Fine has also written for The New York Times, Scientific American, New Scientist, The Psychologist, The Guardian, and The Monthly, among others, and has reviewed books for the Financial Times and The Wall Street Journal.

== Recognition and awards ==
- 2007: A Mind of Its Own was one of twelve books long-listed for the UK Royal Society Science Prize
- 2010–2013: For Delusions of Gender:
  - Shortlisted for the Victorian Premier's Literary Award for non-fiction 2011.
  - Shortlisted for the Best Book of Ideas Prize 2011.
  - Shortlisted for the John Llewellyn Rhys Prize 2010
  - Shortlisted by The Washington Post for 2010 Best Non-Fiction Book of the Year
  - Shortlisted for the 2013 Warwick Prize for Writing.
  - Evening Standard 2010 book of the year
  - Guardian 2010 book of the year.
  - Huffington Post "22 books women think men should read" list
- 2017: The Royal Society Insight Investment Science Book Prize, 2017, for Testosterone Rex
- 2018: recipient of the Edinburgh Medal, which is awarded to "men and women of science and technology whose professional achievements are judged to have made a significant contribution to the understanding and well-being of humanity".
- 2026: elected Fellow of the Australian Academy of the Humanities

== Selected bibliography ==
=== Books ===
Publication date	Title	Publisher	ISBN
17 July 2006	A Mind of Its Own	W. W. Norton & Company	ISBN 0-393-06213-9
26 June 2008	The Britannica Guide to the Brain: A Guided Tour of the Brain and All Its Functions	Constable & Robinson	ISBN 1-84529-803-9
30 August 2010	Delusions of Gender	W. W. Norton & Company	ISBN 0-393-06838-2
24 January 2017	Testosterone Rex	W. W. Norton & Company	ISBN 0-393-08208-3
