= Decoding the Heavens =

Book by Jo Marchant

Decoding the Heavens: A 2,000-Year-old Computer and the Century Long Search to Discover Its Secrets
- First edition
- Author: Jo Marchant
- Language: English
- Genre: Non-fiction
- Publisher: William Heinemann Ltd.
- Publication date: November 2008
- Media type: Print (Hardback)
- Pages: 336 pp
- ISBN: 0-434-01835-X
- OCLC: 230989682

Decoding the Heavens: A 2,000-Year-old Computer and the Century Long Search to Discover Its Secrets by Jo Marchant is an exploration of the history and significance of the Antikythera Mechanism, an ancient mechanical calculator (also described as the first known mechanical computer) designed to calculate astronomical positions. Technological artifacts of similar complexity did not reappear until a thousand years later.

Marchant approaches the mystery of the mechanism in a narrative that begins with the discovery of the Antikythera wreck in 1901 and includes a primer on the development of scuba gear in the 19th century. Throughout the book, Marchant weaves ancient history with the lives and travails of the handful of contemporary scientists who bucked conventional wisdom with their belief that the mechanism embodied technological and mathematical expertise thought to be impossible for its time. It is believed to have been built about 150–100 BC and yet the delicate bronze clockwork it embodies would not be known to Europe until the Middle Ages.

The author acknowledges (p. 302) that none of the principal researchers from the Antikythera Mechanism Research Project were involved "in any way" with the writing of the book. The project has published a commentary that sets out problems with the book's account of their work.

The book's account of the collaboration between Michael Wright and Allan Bromley is disputed.

== Editions ==
The book was first published in November 2008 in hardback by William Heinemann Ltd. (ISBN 0-434-01835-X). It was republished by Da Capo Press in hardback in 2009 (ISBN 978-0-306-81742-7), and in paperback in 2010 (ISBN 978-0-306-81861-5).

== Reviews ==
- Anonymous. (January 26, 2009). "Decoding the Heavens: A 2,000-Year-old Computer and the Century Long Search to Discover Its Secrets" Publishers Weekly, Starred Review (accessed 31 May 2009)
- Collins, P. (February 25, 2009). "Review: Decoding the Heavens by Jo Marchant" New Scientist (accessed 31 May 2009)
- Lake, E. (January 8, 2009). "Decoding the Heavens: Solving the Mystery of the World’s First Computer by Jo Marchant" The Telegraph (accessed 31 May 2009)
- Sims, M. (March 8, 2009). "'Decoding the Heavens' by Jo Marchant", Los Angeles Times (accessed 30 May 2009)
- Turney, J. (November 21, 2008). "Clockwork marvel before its time" The Independent (accessed 31 May 2009)
