= Delusions of Gender =

2010 book by Cordelia Fine

Delusions of Gender: How Our Minds, Society, and Neurosexism Create Difference
- Cover of the first edition
- Author: Cordelia Fine
- Language: English
- Subject: Sex and intelligence
- Publisher: W. W. Norton & Company
- Publication date: 2010
- Publication place: United States
- Media type: Print (hardcover and paperback)
- Pages: 338
- ISBN: 0-393-06838-2

Delusions of Gender: How Our Minds, Society, and Neurosexism Create Difference is a 2010 book by Cordelia Fine, written to debunk the idea that men and women are hardwired with different interests. The author criticises claimed evidence of the existence of innate biological differences between men and women's minds as being faulty and exaggerated, and while taking a position of agnosticism with respect to inherent differences relating to interest/skill in "understanding the world" versus "understanding people", reviews literature demonstrating how cultural and societal beliefs contribute to sex differences.

== Contents ==
In the first part of the book, "'Half Changed World', Half Changed Minds", Fine argues that social and environmental factors strongly influence the mind, challenging a "biology as fallback" view that, since society is equal now for the sexes, persistent inequalities must be due to biology. She also discusses the history and impact of gender stereotypes and the ways that science has been used to justify sexism.

In the second part of the book, "Neurosexism", Fine criticizes the current available arguments and studies supporting sex differences in the mind, focusing on methodological weaknesses and implicit assumptions. Within neuroscientific investigations, these include small samples that give rise to unreliable, spurious results, and poorly justified "reverse inferences" (claims of stereotype-consistent psychological differences between the sexes on the basis of brain differences). Fine also demonstrates how already weak neuroscientific conclusions are then grossly overblown by popular writers. Fine also discusses non-neuroimaging evidence cited as support for innate differences between the sexes. For example, she explains weaknesses in the work done by a student of Simon Baron-Cohen that has been widely cited (by the Gurian Institute, by Leonard Sax, by Peter Lawrence, and by Baron-Cohen himself): one-and-a-half-day-old babies were tested for preference in sequence rather than being given a choice; were tested in different viewing positions, some horizontal on their backs and some held in a parent's lap, which could affect their perception; inadequate efforts were made to ensure the sex of the subject was unknown to the tester at the time of the test; the authors assume, without justification, that newborn looking preferences are a reliable "flag" for later social skills that are the product of a long and complex developmental process.

In the third part of the book, "Recycling Gender", Fine discusses the highly gendered society in which children develop, and the contribution of that to the group identity processes that motivate children to "self-socialize". This challenges the common belief of parents that they tried gender-neutral parenting, but it did not work. An overall thesis of the work is the negative impact for sex equality of neurosexism (popular or academic neuroscientific claims that reinforce or justify gender stereotypes in ways that are not scientifically justified).

== Reception ==
=== Popular press ===
In the UK, the book received positive reviews in Nature, The Independent, The Times Literary Supplement, New Scientist, Metro and The Belfast Telegraph. The Guardian and the Evening Standard each chose it as a Book of the Year. It was Book of the Week in Times Higher Education.

In Australia, the book received positive reviews in The Age, The Australian and The West Australian.

Delusions of Gender received positive reviews in the United States in The New York Times, The Washington Post, USA Today, Newsweek, Jezebel and Kirkus Reviews. Publishers Weekly chose it for a starred review and as a Pick of the Week.

More positive reviews came from Frankfurter Allgemeine Zeitung, The Globe and Mail, Socialist Worker, Out in Perth, The Fat Quarter, Erotic Review, The F Word, Counterfire, Neuroskeptic (at Discover magazine). Ms. magazine and Elle singled the book out for their readers.

- 2013 Warwick Prize for Writing, shortlist
- 2011 Victorian Premier's Literary Award for Non-Fiction, shortlist
- 2011, Best Book of Ideas, shortlist
- 2010, John Llewellyn Rhys Prize, shortlist

=== Academic reception ===
Developmental psychopathologist Simon Baron-Cohen, whose research is criticised in Delusions of Gender, reviewed the book in The Psychologist, saying Fine was "fusing science with politics", and that "Where I – and I suspect many other contemporary scientists – would part ways with Fine is in her strident, extreme denial of the role that biology might play in giving rise to any sex differences in the mind and brain. ...(she) ignores that you can be a scientist interested in the nature of sex differences while being a clear supporter of equal opportunities and a firm opponent of all forms of discrimination in society." Fine responded in a published letter, stating "The thesis of my book [...] is that while social effects on sex differences are well-established, spurious results, poor methodologies and untested assumptions mean we don't yet know whether, on average, males and females are born differently predisposed to systemizing versus empathising."

Former APA President Diane F. Halpern (Note: Halpern co-authored an article, "The Science of Sex Differences in Mathematics and Science", that Fine criticizes in Delusions of Gender.) reviewed the book in the journal Science, concluding that it was "strongest in exposing research conclusions that are closer to fiction than science...[but] weakest in failing to also point out differences that are supported by a body of carefully conducted and well-replicated research", stating that Fine largely ignores the latter body of research.

Stanford neurobiologist Ben Barres stated in a review for PLOS Biology that Delusions of Gender "should be required reading for every neurobiology student, if not every human being".

McCarthy and Ball (2011) reviewed the book in the journal Biology of Sex Differences, stating "Prompting laypeople to adopt a more critical view of overly simplistic views of complex data sets is a goal any scientist can support, and for that we applaud (Fine's) efforts." They suggested that Fine's book presents an oversimplified and seriously distorted characterization of neuroscience as applied to the study of sex differences. They expressed disappointment that Fine's book "...can be vexing in the ways the scientific study of sex differences in brain and behavior is portrayed and (how) the current state-of-the-art is presented".

Evolutionary biologist Marlene Zuk, reviewing the book with Rebecca Jordan-Young's Brain Storm, in the Quarterly Review of Biology wrote: "It is important to emphasize that neither author advocates throwing the gender-neutral baby out with its pink or blue bathwater ... The books are good ammunition for arguments with people who think science has incontrovertibly shown biological bases for gender differences such as mathematical ability. At the same time, they are not simply claiming that "it is all culture" or that science can play no role in understanding gender. Both Fine and Jordan-Young want better science, not less of it."

== See also ==
- Gender role
- Implicit stereotypes
- Sex and intelligence
