= Gavin Pretor-Pinney =

British author

Gavin Edmund Pretor-Pinney is a British author, known for his books The Cloudspotter's Guide and The Wavewatcher's Companion.

== Early life and education ==
Pretor-Pinney is son of Anthony Robert Edmund Pretor-Pinney and Laura Uppercu, daughter of George Winthrop Haight, of Manhattan, observer for the American Bar Association and a specialist in international law. The Pretor-Pinney family were landowners at Somerton, Somerset since the 1800s, descendants of the sugar merchant and Mayor of Bristol Charles Pinney; Anthony Pretor-Pinney had Somerton Erleigh, named for the family's former house on a different part of the estate, built in 1972–3.

Pretor-Pinney attended Westminster School, the University of Oxford, and Central Saint Martins College of Art and Design.

== Career ==
In 1991, Tom Hodgkinson came up with the idea for a magazine called The Idler, immediately recruiting his friend and neighbour, Pretor-Pinney, to help him develop the concept; they co-founded the magazine, publishing its first issue in 1993.

In 2004, Pretor-Pinney was asked to speak at a conference, where he gave a talk titled "Inaugural Lecture of the Cloud Appreciation Society"; so many people showed joy and interest in the concept that, in 2005, he founded the Cloud Appreciation Society.

== Awards and honours ==
- 2011 Royal Society Winton Prize for Science Books, winner, The Wavewatcher's Companion

== Works ==
- The Cloudspotter's Guide (2006)
- The Cloud Collector's Handbook (2006)
- A Pig with Six Legs and Other Clouds (2007)
- The Wavewatcher's Companion (2010)
- The Ukulele Handbook (September 2013; co-written with Tom Hodgkinson)
- A Cloud A Day (2019)

== Television appearances ==
- Presented on BBC TV: Cloudspotting
- Appeared on BBC TV: The Secret Life of Waves
