= Frederick Grinnell (biologist) =

American biologist

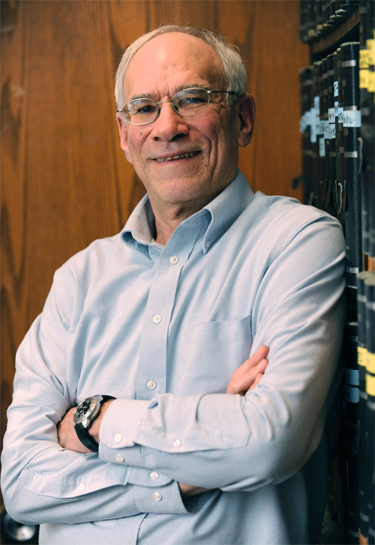
- Frederick Grinnell at UT Southwestern Medical Center
- Born: 1945 (age 80–81); Philadelphia, Pennsylvania
- Scientific career
- Fields: Cell biology, Bioethics and Science education
- Workplaces: UT Southwestern Medical Center

Frederick Grinnell (born 1945 in Philadelphia, Pennsylvania) is an American cell biologist. He is currently the Robert McLemore Professor of Medical Science in the Department of Cell Biology at UT Southwestern Medical Center in Dallas, Texas.

Grinnell has written two books about the nature of scientific inquiry: The Scientific Attitude and Everyday Practice of Science: Where Intuition and Passion Meet Objectivity and Logic. Everyday Practice of Science was shortlisted for the 2010 Royal Society Science Book Prize. He is a Fellow of the History and Philosophy of Science division of the American Association for the Advancement of Science.

== Awards ==
- 2012: University of Texas System Regents' Outstanding Teaching Award.
- 2012: Awarded Fellow of the American Association for the Advancement of Science, Section on History and Philosophy of Science.
- 2017: Receives Texas Statewide Piper Professor Award.
