= The Wavewatcher's Companion =

2010 science book by Gavin Pretor-Pinney

- Author: Gavin Pretor-Pinney
- Language: English
- Genre: Science books
- Publisher: Bloomsbury
- Publication date: 2010
- Publication place: United Kingdom
- Media type: Print
- Pages: 336 pp
- ISBN: 978-0-7475-8976-1

The Wavewatcher's Companion is a 2010 popular science book by Gavin Pretor-Pinney.

The book was the 2011 winner of the Royal Society Winton Prize for Science Books.

== Theme ==
The book covers topics related to waves in various forms and their presence in daily life.

The book's topics include:

- waves that exist within our bodies;
- the waves that give rise to music and colour;
- the waves that drive the information age;
- and the waves of nature, of the earth, sea and air.

As Jennifer Ouellette of the Wall Street Journal describes, Pretor-Pinney 'employs a chatty, conversational tone, with clear technical explanations enlivened by real-world examples, whimsical asides, personal anecdotes and inventive analogies' to explain his subject.

== Reception ==
The book was well received on its publication. Victoria Segal of The Guardian enthused that Pretor-Pinney "has the gifted teacher's knack for finding the right metaphor to hook the attention". Toby Clements of the Daily Telegraph felt it was a worthy sequel to Pretor-Pinney's previous surprise best-seller, 'The Cloudspotter's Guide.

The book was the 2011 winner of the Royal Society Winton Prize for Science Books, the prestigious award for science writing. Richard Holmes, the Chair of judging panel, said it was a 'highly unusual and outstandingly effective piece of popular science writing and that Pretor-Pinney "had managed to use relatively straight-forward science to transform the readers' perspective of the world around them". Richard Holmes noted the importance of the award stating “Popular science is an increasingly important genre, and this is an increasingly important prize".
