= God's Philosophers =

2009 book by James Hannam

- First edition
- Author: James Hannam
- Language: English
- Genre: History of science
- Publisher: Icon Books
- Publication date: 2009
- Publication place: United Kingdom
- Pages: 435
- ISBN: 9781848311503

God's Philosophers: How the Medieval World Laid the Foundations of Modern Science is a 2009 book written by British historian of science James Hannam (UK: Icon Books).

The book challenges the view that "there was no science worth mentioning in the Middle Ages … [and] that the Church held back what meagre advances were made". Hannam rebuts a number of modern myths about Medieval Christianity such as the idea that the Inquisition burned people for their science or that people in the Middle Ages thought the Earth was flat. He lists 13th century inventions such as spectacles, the mechanical clock, the windmill, and the blast furnace to argue that "medieval scholars got their hands on the work of classical Greeks, they developed systems of thought that allowed science to travel far further than it had in the ancient world."

The US edition of the book was published in 2011 by Regnery Press under the title The Genesis of Science: How the Christian Middle Ages Launched the Scientific Revolution.

== Content ==
In his introduction to God’s Philosophers, Hannam sets forth his argument that many of the negative descriptions of the Middle Ages as scientific "Dark Ages" is based on myth. "Popular opinion, journalistic cliché and misinformed historians notwithstanding, recent research has shown that the Middle Ages was a period of enormous advances in science, technology and culture." The first twelve chapters of the book are devoted to sciences in the Middle Ages; the last nine chapters consider the Renaissance and Reformation. Galileo is the focus of the last three chapters (19–21).

=== Science in the Middle Ages ===
In chapter one Hannam gives a brief historical outline of the early Middle Ages up to AD1000. Hannam writes that during this period western Europe recovered from the fall of the Roman Empire and began to rebuild with the emergence of several important inventions, like the plough, horseshoe and watermill.

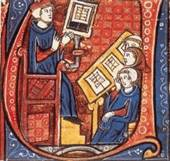
14th Century medieval university.

From chapter two to chapter thirteen, Hannam covers a wide range of topics relating to the history of science, such as mathematics, astronomy, physics, medicine, alchemy and astrology.

Chapter three ("The Rise of Reason") and chapter four ("The Twelfth-Century Renaissance") seeks to show how the West regained the heritage of ancient Greek learning. Hannam contends that the "rise of reason" is not the Enlightenment, but the eleventh and twelfth century turn to natural theology. He refers to the medieval university as the fundamental institutional entity. He further contends that the starting point for all of natural philosophy in the Middle Ages was the belief that nature had been created by God. Thus, medieval philosophers expected to find logic and reason in natural phenomena.

Hannam then turns to the subject of medicine, suggesting there were three options in the Middle Ages for a person who fell ill: "the church, the local healer, or a qualified doctor". He describes how each might treat their patient. Hannam declares that, with the exception of smallpox vaccinations, "the history of medicine until the midnineteenth century… is a history of failure."

In chapter eight on "The Secret Arts of Alchemy and Astrology", Hannam looks at astrology and the Church’s attitude toward it.

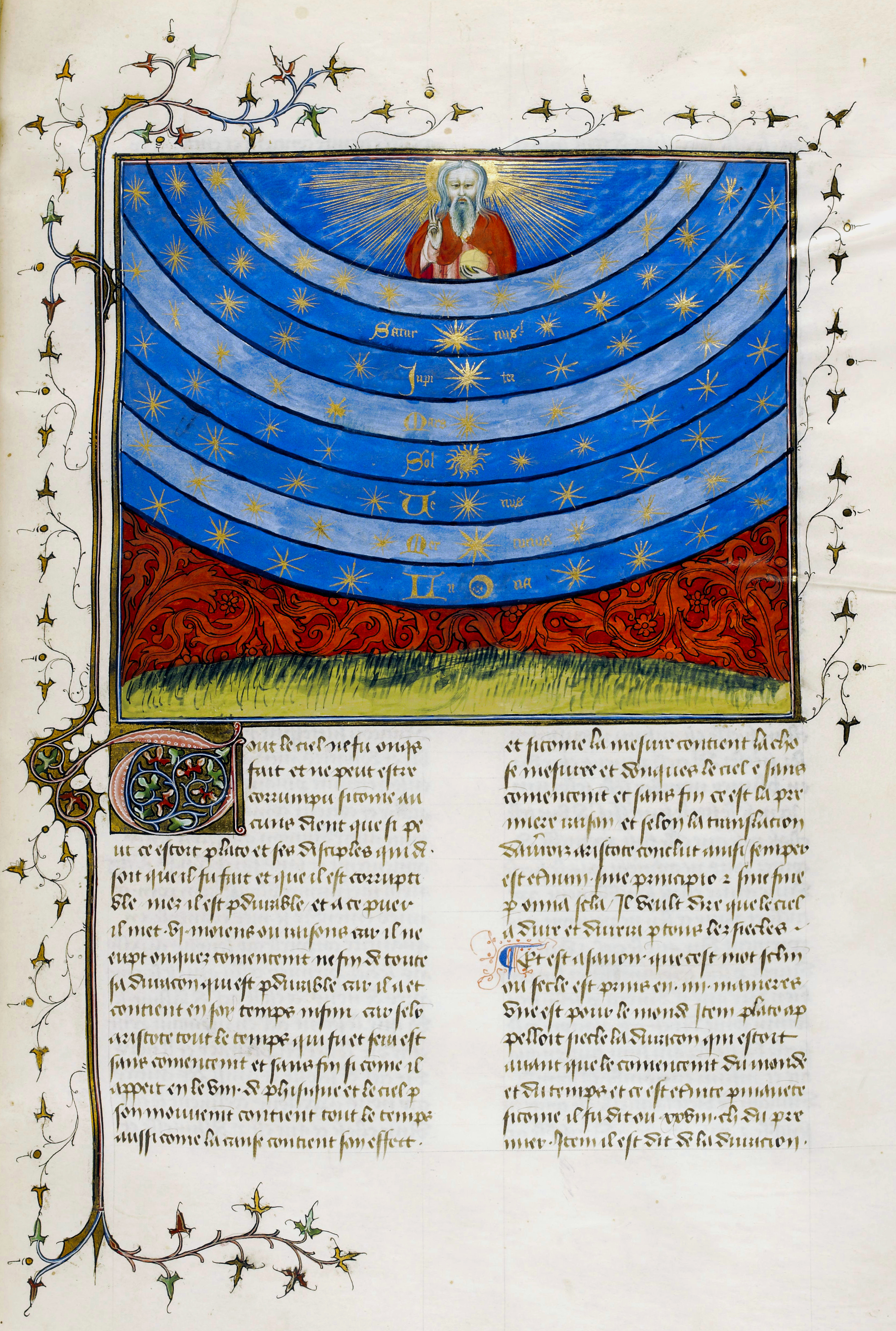
A page from Oresme's Livre du ciel et du monde, 1377, showing the celestial spheres

Other chapters also include interesting cases of relevant scientific activity. In Chapter 10 Hannam introduces Oxford scholar – Richard of Wallingford (1292–1336) and his invention of the mechanical clock: "Besides his achievements in astronomy, he built one of the finest and most complicated clocks of the Middle Ages, despite suffering from the dreadful affliction of leprosy."

Chapter eleven ("The Merton Calculators’") and twelve ("The Apogee of Medieval Science") reveal the advances in scientific thought that occurred at the universities of Oxford and Paris in the fourteenth century. Hannam points to Bradwardine's "law of motion"; descriptions of falling objects in a vacuum; and the mean speed theorem, as illustrated by William Heytesbury. Hannam also describes Buridan and Oresme's discussion of the Earth's possible axial rotation, and Albert of Saxony's description of the trajectory of a flying cannon ball. Regarding whether these speculations threatened the Church, Hannam writes "almost all the practitioners were members of the clergy… mechanics and mathematics did not cause any concern."

On the more delicate issue of the rejection of atomism which challenged the Catholic view of Holy Communion he said "certainly, this was a clear cut of theological orthodoxy curtailing philosophical enquiry. But this happened so rarely that we cannot maintain that the Church held back science in general." He continued: "the popular image of the medieval church as a monolithic institution opposing any sort of scientific speculation is clearly inaccurate. Natural philosophy had proven itself useful and worth supporting. It is hard to imagine how any philosophy at all would have taken place if the Church-sponsored universities had not provided a home for it." Hannam argues that the Church did not influence free research any more than private financiers do today: "The Church allowed natural philosophers a much wider dispensation than many corporate interests allow their researchers today."

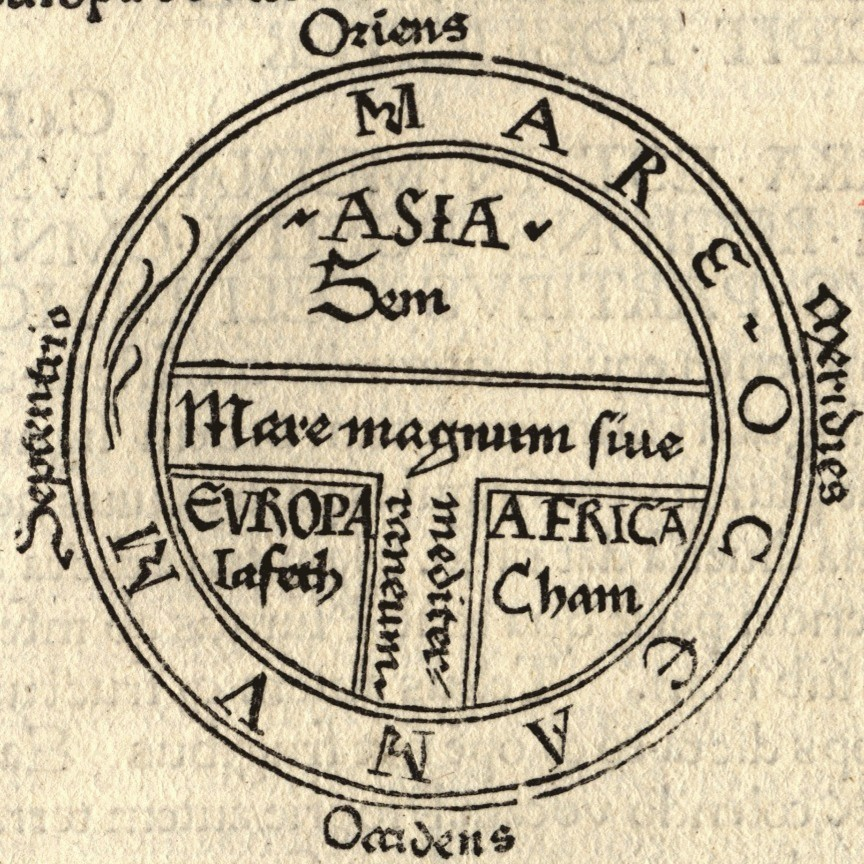
A T and O map from the first printed version of Isidore's Etymologies (636).

In chapter thirteen, Hannam explores the voyages of Christopher Columbus and how he did not believe the Earth was flat, as some claim. Based on the theories of Pierre D'Ailly (1350-1420), Columbus believed it was possible to reach the Far East by sailing west. The opposition he initially encountered from the Portuguese monarchy was due to the length of the voyage, which Columbus-D'Ailly had underestimated, and not to the fact that the earth was flat, rather than spherical.

Some other impressive scientific achievements discussed include the invention of eyeglasses, windmills, and the printing press.

=== Renaissance and Reformation ===
Hannam then turns to the rise of humanism and its impact on science and technology in chapter fourteen.

While Humanists recovered ancient Greek mathematical texts, Hannam rejects their advances made in philosophy during this period. Moreover, he states that the Protestant Reformation broke the Catholic Church’s ability to control science however also made it less accepting of new ideas.

In chapter sixteen, Hannam demonstrates how human dissection advanced the understanding of the human body. The myth removed by Hannam is that the medieval Church opposed human dissection: "If the Catholic Church had really objected strongly to human dissections, they would not have rapidly become part of the syllabus in every major European medical school."

Chapter seventeen relates the story of how Nicolaus Copernicus (1473-1543) supposed that the Earth orbited the Sun, and not the other way around as was the consensus at the time. Hannam again suggests that Copernicus owed his theory to much earlier scholars such as John Buridan who in 1350 proposed that sunrise and sunset was caused by the Earth moving, and not the Sun.

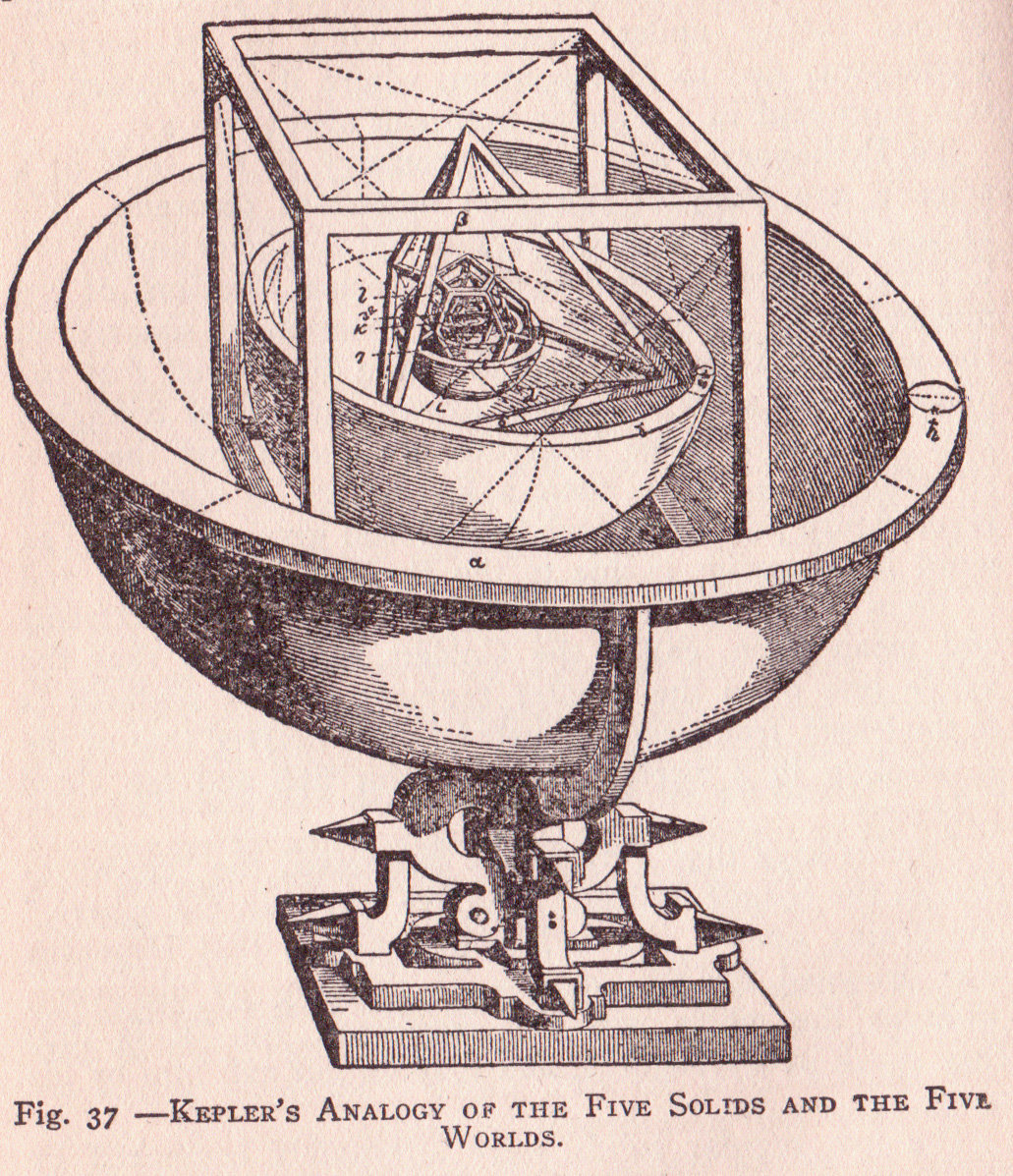
Kepler's first model of the universe in The Mystery of the Universe (1596).

Chapter eighteen shows how Copernicus’s theory was adopted by Johannes Kepler (1571–1630).

=== Galileo ===
The last three chapters focus on Galileo and his contemporaries, who is probably the most well known among the scientists supposedly persecuted by the Church. Hannam suggests that Galileo borrowed ideas from earlier thinkers and used them to construct his own theories about matter and motion: "Galileo pulled together many of the strands of medieval thought to form the basis of modern science." According to Hannam, Galileo not only did not recognised his scientific debts towards his medieval predecessors, but he even plagiarised Nicole Oresme and William Heytesbury regarding the theory of falling bodies and the aforementioned mean speed theorem. In this, he comments, Galileo was "not quite honest about the extent to which he draws on prior work". For Hannam Galileo certainly contributed to the progress of science, but only from an experimental, not theoretical, point of view. However, the famous experiment with rolling balls down an inclined plane was also performed by Giovanni Marliani more than a hundred years earlier, even if the hypothesis he wanted to demonstrate, unlike Galileo, was wrong.

=== Conclusion "A Scientific Revolution?" ===
In his brief conclusion Hannam contends that four cornerstones - institutional, technological, metaphysical, and theoretical - laid the foundations of early modern science.

== Reception ==
Edward Grant, acclaimed historian of medieval science, wrote that the book was "very well written and a delight to read". Grant lauded Hannam's account for its "unusual descriptions of various aspects of contemporary life", that made it "extremely interesting and engaging." Grant disagreed with some of Hannam's claims yet summed up the book this way: "Hannam has written a splendid book and fully supported his claim that the Middle Ages laid the foundations of modern science… although it was intended for a non-academic audience, this book would prove quite useful as a text in a university course in the history of science."

The book was praised by historian and journalist Dan Jones in Spectator as a "very useful general survey of a difficult topic, and a robust defence of an unfairly maligned age… [Hannam] gives us a great sense of the porousness of the medieval mind."

Igal Galili, professor of science education, interpreted the book as "well written and interesting." Galili contends the book should be included in physics education by means of the history and philosophy of science: "This could seem to be an issue for general curiosity, but it is not, since without awareness of this debt that we owe in science education, we easily make inadequate inferences regarding the nature of science, and we often misinterpret the meaning of the knowledge that we possess and teach."

Writing in Philosophy in Review, philosopher and energetics historian Robert Deltete, warmly recommended the book as "an engaging read". He writes, "In opposition to popular opinion, journalistic cliche, and misinformed historians, Hannam shows that the Middle Ages was a period of enormous advances in science, technology and culture." Hannam does an "especially nice job" of appealing to general readers. Deltete makes one concession, "that Hannam's motives sometimes seem overly apologetic in emphasizing Church tolerance and excusing Church excesses". But this doesn’t detract from Hannam as "a very good storyteller who manages to bring to life a plethora of obscure figures."

Jonathan Birch, intellectual historian and researcher at the University of Glasgow, dubbed Hannam's project "a success", but stated he had some reservations about the focus in parts of the book. Birch cites Peter Abelard's tragic romance with Héloïse and the darkly comic picture of Abelard's castration. Birch writes "such stories add human drama to the history of ideas, but do interesting biographical vignettes come at the expense of intellectual content?" In the book’s section on St Thomas Aquinas "some important arguments are stated rather than fully explained." Birch concludes: "specialists in other areas could no doubt stake a claim for more detailed discussions of their own preoccupations… but collectively these claims would place an unfair burden on a book with this scope. God’s Philosophers contributes admirably to the public understanding of the complex and interconnected histories of science, philosophy and religion."

Boris Johnson reviewed the book in The Mail on Sunday. He wrote "wonderful… With an engaging fervour, James Hannam has set about rescuing the reputation of a bunch of half-forgotten thinkers, and he shows how they paved the way for modern science."

Reviewing the book in The Guardian, Tim Radford questioned Hannam's project: "Medieval scholars anticipated a surprising number of scientific innovations, but does that really make them the founders of modern science?" He goes on to write "Almost the only annoying thing about James Hannam's admirable book is his opening insistence on a conspiracy of 'popular opinion, journalistic cliche and misinformed historians' to denigrate the Middle Ages… in this conspiracy, whenever someone discovered evidence of reason or progress in the 14th or 15th centuries, he writes 'it could easily be labelled 'early-Renaissance' so as to preserve the negative connotations of the adjective 'medieval'. The OED gives no dates for the medieval period, but it tells me that the Renaissance began in Italy in the 14th century."

Charles Freeman criticized Hannam’s book in the New Humanist for its "distorted view of the medieval period and the development of science that suits his Catholic agenda". In the very specific context of the books inclusion on the Royal Society Book of the Year shortlist, Freeman wrote that God’s Philosophers doesn't deserve all of its accolades, and that "its vivid style masks a number of serious academic weaknesses which combine to make the book vastly overrated." Freeman attacks the book for being "poorly structured, without a coherent argument and often misleading, either through making assertions for which there is no, or contrary, evidence or by omitting evidence that would weaken its case". For example, Hannam "virtually ignores" Ancient Greek and Arab contributions to modern science. Freeman concludes "Its success is mystifying."

Hannam replied to Freeman’s criticism of his book, which New Humanist published also. In response to Freeman’s claim that he ignored Greek and Arab intellectual traditions, Hannam wrote, "I hardly ignore the achievements of either of these civilisations. I just didn’t write a book about them." Hannam concluded, "while I make no secret of my religious affiliations, if I woke up tomorrow as an atheist, I would stand by every word of it." Freeman then wrote an article in response to Hannam's words.

=== Awards and nominations ===
The book was shortlisted in 2010 for the Royal Society Prize for Science Books. The judges said:

"A vibrant insight into the medieval approach to science, full of wonderful anecdotes and personalities. Dispelling common myths about the 'dark ages', this is a very readable book about a neglected era in the history of science. It very much fills a gap, making you realise that the great scientific achievements of the Renaissance are in debt to the "philosophers" prepared to sacrifice long held beliefs and frequently their lives for their ideas."

In 2011 it was shortlisted for the Dingle Prize of the British Society for the History of Science.
