= Power, Sex, Suicide =

2005 book by Nick Lane

Power, Sex, Suicide: Mitochondria and the Meaning of Life
- Front cover image.
- Author: Nick Lane
- Subject: Evolutionary biology
- Publisher: Oxford University Press
- Publication date: 2005
- Publication place: United Kingdom
- ISBN: 978-0-19-920564-6

Power, Sex, Suicide: Mitochondria and the Meaning of Life is a 2005 popular science book by the biochemist Nick Lane, in which he argues that mitochondria are central to questions of the evolution of multicellularity, the evolution of sexual reproduction, and to the process of senescence.

Amongst the theories advanced in the book, Lane endorses the hydrogen hypothesis for the formation of the eukaryotic cell, whereby mitochondria are the original defining characteristic of the structure. He argues that the event was an exceedingly improbable one and questions the likelihood of its having happened elsewhere in the Universe. He suggests that the necessity for genetic compatibility between mitochondrial and nuclear DNA lies behind the differentiation of sex, ensuring that only one sexual partner contributes mitochondrial DNA to offspring.

Steven Rose in The Guardian said that the book contains "one of the most interesting stories modern biology has to tell". It was shortlisted for the Royal Society Science Book Prize in 2006.
