= Henry Pollack (geophysicist) =

- Born: July 13, 1936 (age 90)
- Education: University of Michigan; Cornell University
- Scientific career
- Fields: Geophysics
- Workplaces: University of Michigan

Henry N. Pollack is an American emeritus professor of geophysics at the University of Michigan. Pollack received his A.B. from Cornell University in 1958 and Ph.D. in 1963 from the University of Michigan. He is also an advisor to the National Science Foundation and an author (along with 2000 other people) of a report by the Intergovernmental Panel on Climate Change which was awarded the 2007 Nobel Peace Prize with Al Gore. Pollack has conducted scientific research on all seven continents and has traveled regularly to Antarctica.

In 2010, Pollack wrote the book A World Without Ice which provides an analysis of climate change science. In 2003, he wrote Uncertain Science ... Uncertain World.

== Honours and awards ==
- Fellow, American Association for the Advancement of Science, elected in 1991
- Fellow, American Geophysical Union
- Fellow, Geological Society of America
