= Myōjin Knoll =

Feature of the ocean floor in the Pacific Ocean near the island of Aogashima, Japan

Myōjin Knoll (Japanese 明神海丘) is an underwater volcano in the Pacific Ocean off the coast of Japan which gained attention when a unicellular organism that had attributes of both eukaryotes and prokaryotes, Parakaryon myojinensis, was discovered there.
