= Nick Lane =

British biochemist and writer (born 1967)

Nicholas James Lane
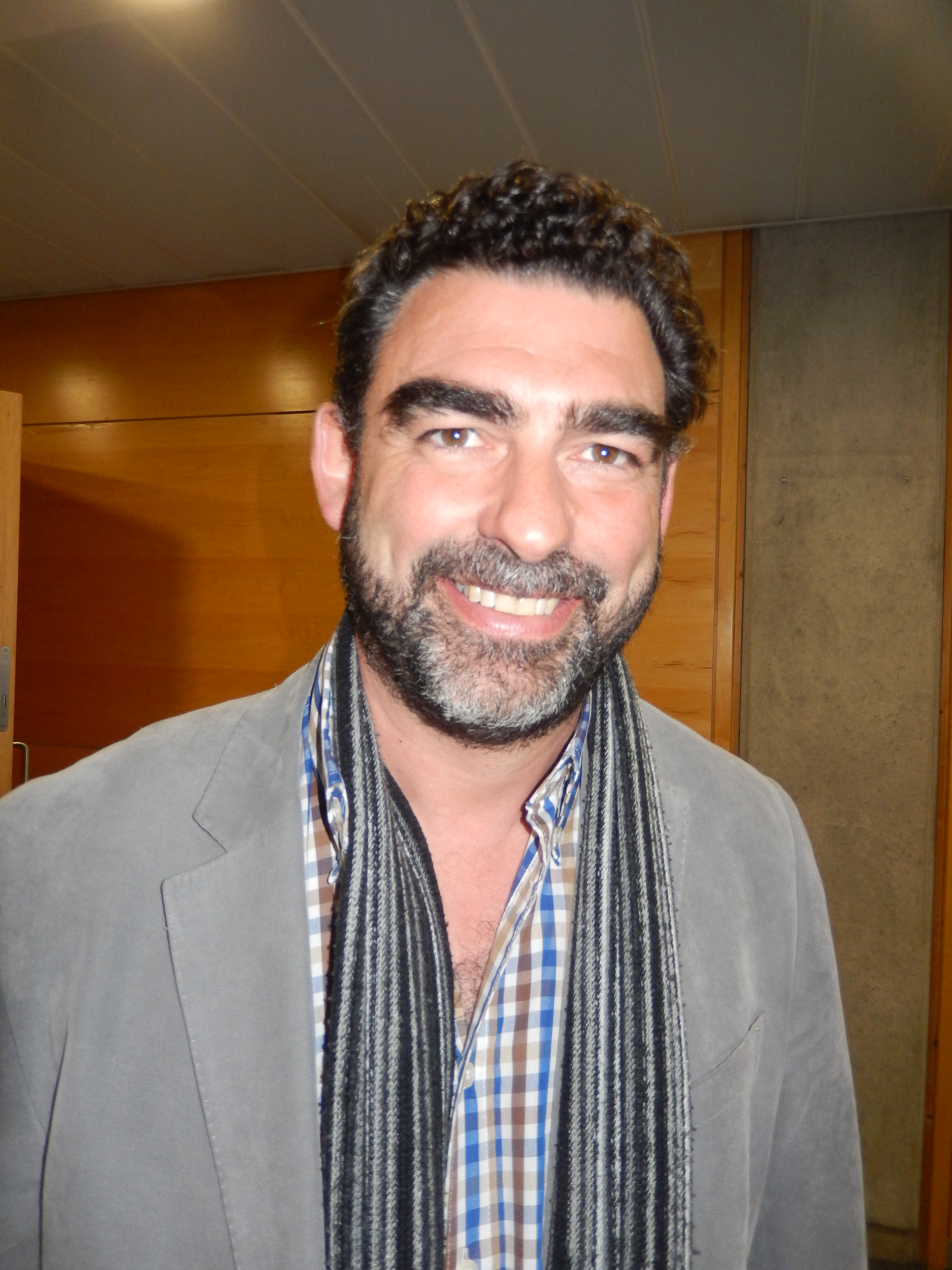
- Lane in 2017
- Born: 1967 (age 58–59)
- Education: Imperial College London; Royal Free Hospital Medical School
- Spouse: Ana Hidalgo-Simon
- Awards: Biochemical Society Award (2015); Michael Faraday Prize (2016)
- Scientific career
- Fields: Biochemistry
- Workplaces: University College London
- Thesis: In vivo studies of ischaemia-reperfusion injury in hypothermically stored rabbit renal autograft
- Website: www.nick-lane.net

Nick Lane (born 1967) is a British biochemist and writer. He is a professor of evolutionary biochemistry at University College London. His books have won several awards.

== Career ==
After taking his first degree at Imperial College London, Nick Lane earned his PhD from the Royal Free Hospital Medical School in 1995 with a dissertation titled "In vivo studies of ischaemia-reperfusion injury in hypothermically stored rabbit renal autograft". He then worked as Medical Writer at Oxford Clinical Communications for a year before joining the medical multimedia company Medi Cine International as a writer. In 1999 he became strategic director at what was, by then, Adelphi Medi Cine, a post he held until 2002.

He became an Honorary Researcher at University College London in 1997, and an Honorary Reader in 2006. He was the first Provost's Venture Research Fellow there from 2009 to 2012. Since October 2013 he has been Reader in Evolutionary Biochemistry at UCL. He is the author of popular science books and many articles on the origin of life, hydrothermal vents, evolution, and cellular biology, among topics. He is the winner of the 2015 Biochemical Society Award and the 2016 Michael Faraday Prize.

== Publications ==
His book, Life Ascending: The Ten Great Inventions of Evolution, won the 2010 Royal Society Prize for Science Books. He appeared on In Our Time on BBC Radio 4 on 13 September 2012, when the topic of discussion was the cell, and again on 15 May 2014, when the topic was photosynthesis.

=== Books ===
- Lane, Nick (2002). Oxygen: The molecule that made the world. Oxford University Press. ISBN 978-0198508038.
- ——— Fuller, Barry; Benson, Erica, eds. (2004). Life in the Frozen State. CRC Press. ISBN 978-0415247009.
- ——— (2005). Power, Sex, Suicide: Mitochondria and the Meaning of Life. Oxford University Press. ISBN 978-0192804815.
- ——— (2009). Life Ascending: The Ten Great Inventions of Evolution. Profile Books. ISBN 978-1861978486.
- ——— (2015). The Vital Question: Why Is Life The Way It Is?. Profile Books. ISBN 978-1781250365.
- ——— (2022). Transformer: The Deep Chemistry of Life and Death. W. W. Norton & Company. ISBN 978-0-393-65148-5.

=== Selected articles ===
- Lane, Nick (29 March 2006). "Mitochondrial disease: Powerhouse of disease". Nature. 440 (7084): 600–2. Bibcode:2006Natur.440..600L. doi:10.1038/440600a. PMID 16572142. S2CID 5084616.
- ——— (25 October 2006). "Cell biology: Power games". Nature. 443 (7114): 901–903. Bibcode:2006Natur.443..901L. doi:10.1038/443901a. PMID 17066004. S2CID 4430396.
- ——— (19 November 2009). "Biodiversity: On the origin of bar codes". Nature. 462 (7271): 272–274. doi:10.1038/462272a. PMID 19924185.
- ——— (7 August 2010). "Genesis Revisited'". New Scientist.
- ——— (25 June 2012). "Life: is it inevitable or just a fluke?". New Scientist.
