= Steve Ramirez =

Neuroscientist

Steve Ramirez (born 1988) is a neuroscientist whose professional career centers around the manipulation of the brain's physical properties. Through his work, Ramirez aims to find methods of relief for symptoms of mental health disorders through the use of optogenetics.

Ramirez graduated from Boston University in 2010 and later earned his Ph.D. in neuroscience from MIT while working in the lab of Susumu Tonegawa.

== Early life ==
Ramirez was born in Massachusetts to Salvadoran immigrants and grew up in Everett, Massachusetts. His parents, older brother, and sister escaped wartime El Salvador towards the end of the 1970s and came to the United States. In his early teens, Ramirez's cousin experienced atrophy and coma during childbirth, which influenced Ramirez's curiosity on the topic of neuroscience, and the ability to physically manipulate brain chemistry. In middle school, he would use the internet to learn more about the brain and its molecular components. He later attended high school in Massachusetts.

Ramirez attended college at Boston University in Massachusetts where he was trying to find an academic field that suited him. His girlfriend at the time suggested to Ramirez that he should seek guidance from the head of department of the neuroscience program at Boston University. Ramirez agreed, and began to be mentored by the head of department, where he developed a passion for the field of work and found a community among the members of the program. When Ramirez and his girlfriend broke up, he was inspired to see if he could change the feelings behind those memories while keeping the memory intact.

Throughout the rest of his education, Ramirez decided to focus his studies on the neuroscience of memory, which began the path of his career and achievements. After graduating from college in 2010, Ramirez joined the lab of Susumu Tonegawa where he continued his studies, and eventually earned his Ph.D. in neuroscience. Ramirez's earliest scientific work occurred with the help of his mentor, Xu Liu, who Ramirez attributes much of his achievements to, and claims that Liu taught him many skills necessary for their work.

== Career ==
Steve Ramirez is known for his studies on memory where he went on to publish six research articles under Tonegawa Susumu's lab. In 2013, Ramirez collaborated with the Massachusetts Institute of Technology (MIT), which studied how false memories can be formed in the hippocampus. Ramirez and Liu also gave a TED Talk in which they discussed their research. Ramirez expressed how he was manipulating the brain cells of mice to respond to pulses of light and manipulate their memories. He was aiming to make this process accessible to humans as well to treat mental illness.His current work revolves around eliminating bad memories and enhancing good ones to aid people suffering from PTSD and depression.He creates and deletes memories in the rodents brain and he hopes that one day to wipe out bad memories and enhance good ones in the human brain.

Ramirez’s 2025 book “How to Change a Memory: One Neuroscientist’s Quest to Alter the Past” links an account of memory research with a personal reflection on his scientific and social relationship with research partner, mentor, and close friend Xu Liu.

== Awards ==
- 2014 Smithsonian American Ingenuity award along with his associate Xu Liu, PhD., for their work on artificial reaction and creation of memories
- Featured in Forbes' 30 under 30 in 2015, being recognized among young influential scientists
- 2019 National Institutes of Health Director's Transformative Research Award alongside Christine Ann Denny, Ph.D.
- 2019 Presidential Early Career Award for Scientists and Engineers (PECASE).
