= The Vital Question =

2015 book by Nick Lane

The Vital Question: Why is Life the Way it is?
- Author: Nick Lane
- Subject: Origin of life
- Genre: Popularisation of science
- Publisher: Profile Books
- Publication date: 2015
- ISBN: 978-0-393-08881-6 (Hardcover)

The Vital Question is a book by the English biochemist Nick Lane about the way the evolution and origin of life on Earth was constrained by the provision of energy.

The book was well received by critics; The New York Times, for example, found it "seductive and often convincing" though the reviewer considered much of it speculative beyond the evidence provided. The Guardian wrote that the book presented hard evidence and tightly interlocking theory on a question once thought inaccessible to science, the origin of life. New Scientist found the book's arguments powerful and persuasive with many testable ideas; that it was not easy to read was compensated by the "incredible, epic story" that it told. The Telegraph wrote that the book succeeded brilliantly as science writing, expanding the reader's horizons with a gripping narrative.

== Context ==
Early theories of the origin of life included spontaneous generation from non-living matter and panspermia, the arrival of life on earth from other bodies in space. The question of how life originated became urgent when Charles Darwin's 1859 On the Origin of Species became widely accepted by biologists. The evolution of new species by splitting off from older ones implied that all life forms were derived from a few such forms, perhaps only one, as Darwin had suggested at the end of his book. In a private letter, Darwin suggested that life could have originated in some "warm little pond" containing a suitable mixture of chemical compounds. The question has continued to be debated into the 21st century.

Nick Lane is a biochemist at University College London; he researches "evolutionary biochemistry and bioenergetics, focusing on the origin of life and the evolution of complex cells." He has become known as a science writer, having written four books about evolutionary biochemistry.

== Book ==
=== Synopsis ===
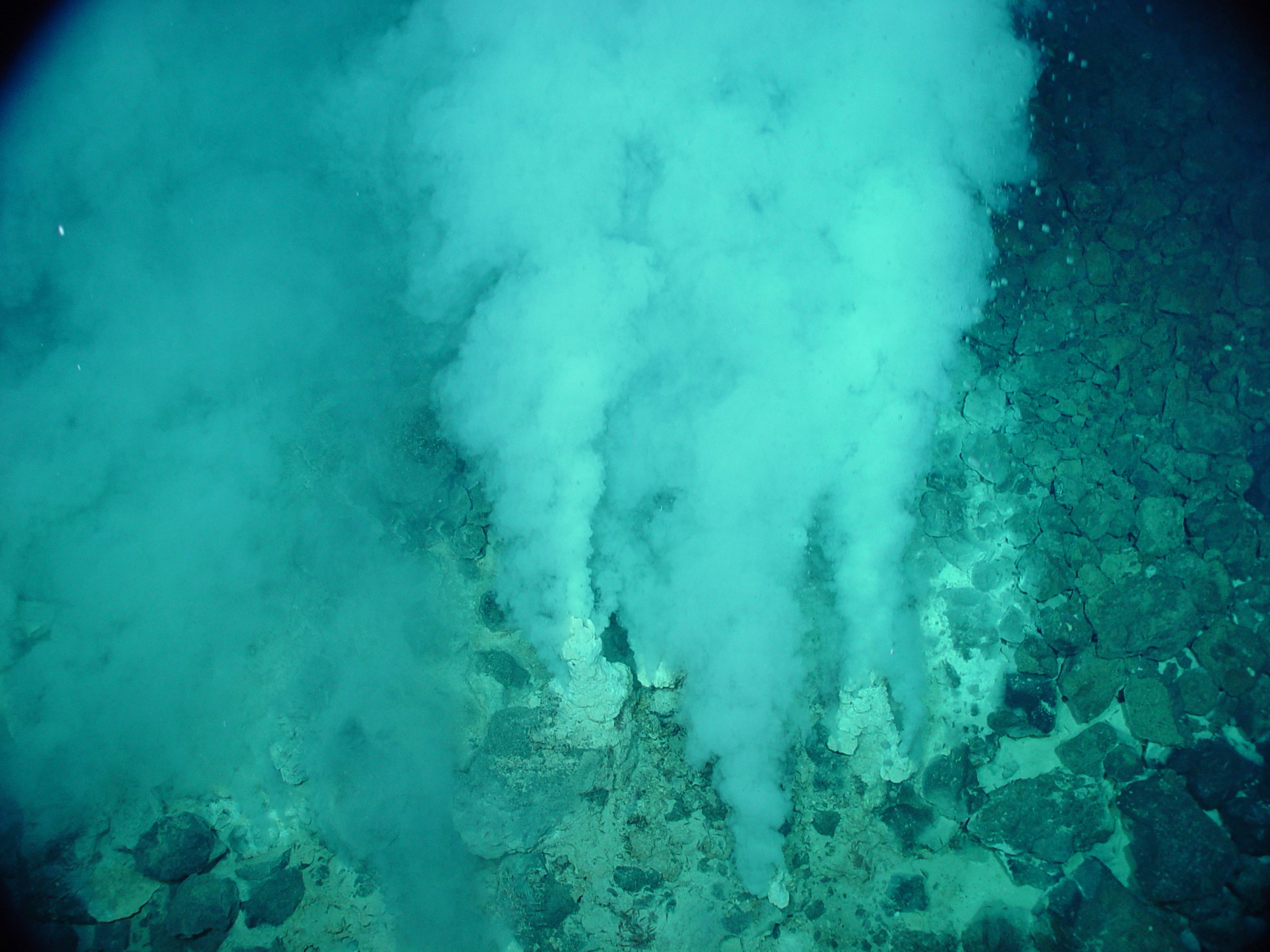
Lane argues that alkaline hydrothermal vents known as white smokers provided the energy for the earliest forms of life.

In the book, Lane discusses what he considers to be a major gap in biology: why life operates the way that it does, and how it began. In his view as a biochemist, the core question is about energy, as all cells handle energy in the same way, relying on a steep electrochemical gradient across the very small thickness of a membrane in a cell – to power all the chemical reactions of life. The electrical energy is transformed into forms that the cell can use by a chain of energy-handling structures including ancient proteins such as cytochromes, ion channels, and the enzyme ATP synthase, all built into the membrane. Once evolved, this chain has been conserved by all living things, showing that it is vital to life. He argues that such an electrochemical gradient could not have arisen in ordinary conditions, such as the open ocean or Darwin's "warm little pond". He argues instead (following Günter Wächtershäuser) that life began in deep-sea hydrothermal vents, as these contain chemicals that effectively store energy that cells could use, as long as the cells provided a membrane to generate the needed gradient by maintaining different concentrations of chemicals on either side.

Once cells similar to bacteria (the first prokaryotes, cells without a nucleus) had emerged, he writes, they stayed like that for two and a half billion years. Then, just once, cells jumped in complexity and size, acquiring a nucleus and other organelles, and complex behavioural features including sex, which he notes have become universal in complex (eukaryotic) life forms including plants, animals, and fungi.

The book is illustrated with 37 figures taken by permission from a wide variety of research sources. They include a timeline, photographs, cladograms, electron flow diagrams and diagrams of the life cycle of cells and their chromosomes.

=== Publication history ===
The book was first published by Profile Books in 2015. The British edition was subtitled with the question of the title, "Why is Life the Way it is?", whereas the American edition was subtitled with the explanation "Energy, Evolution, and the Origins of Complex Life". A paperback edition came out in 2016. The book has been translated into at least seven languages: Chinese, German, Japanese, Korean, Polish, Spanish, and Turkish.

== Reception ==
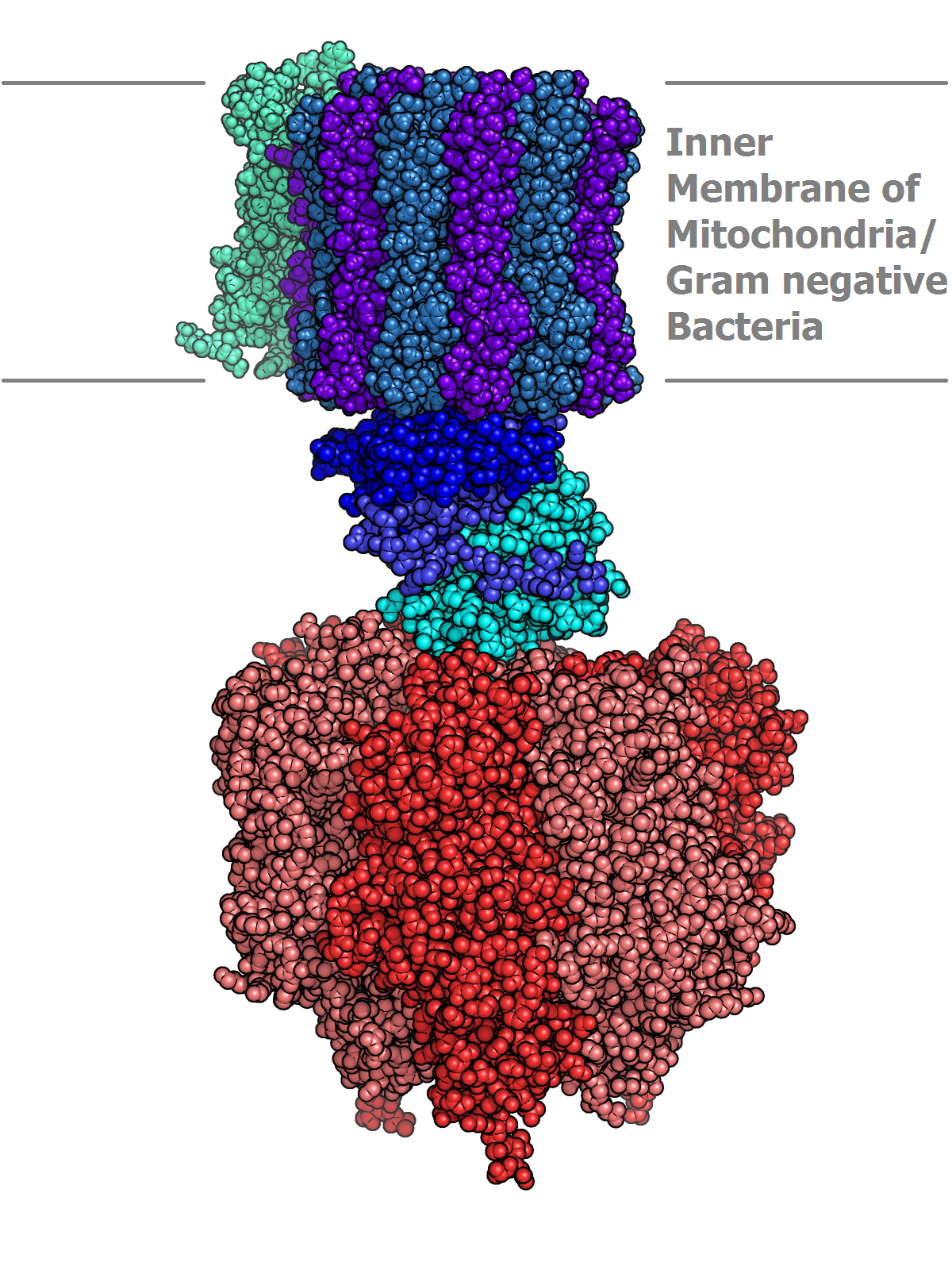
The head of the universal ATP synthase molecule is made to rotate, driving the formation of the energy molecule ATP.

Tim Requarth, reviewing The Vital Question for The New York Times, finds the book "seductive and often convincing, though speculation far outpaces evidence in many of the book’s passages. But perhaps for a biological theory of everything, that's to be expected, even welcomed."

Peter Forbes, reviewing The Vital Question in The Guardian, noted that the origin of life was once thought to be "safely consigned to wistful armchair musing", but that in the past 20 years new research in genomics, geology, biochemistry and molecular biology have transformed thinking in the field. "Here is the book that presents all this hard evidence and tightly interlocking theory to a wider audience.", writes Forbes.

Michael LePage, reviewing the book in New Scientist, writes that the fact that complex cells only evolved once is "very peculiar when you think about it", but it is just one of many large mysteries that Lane addresses, including aging and death, sex, and speciation. LePage finds Lane's arguments "powerful and persuasive", with many testable ideas. The book is not, he writes, the easiest to read, but "it does tell an incredible, epic story", from the dawn of life to the present day.

Lane explains how proton gradients across cell membranes power all living things.

Caspar Henderson, in his book review in The Telegraph, writes that Lane's book "succeeds brilliantly" as good science writing can, expanding the reader's horizons "in ways not previously imagined." Lane explains why the counterintuitive idea "that cross-membrane proton gradients power all living cells" is no mere technical detail: per gram, he notes, the power is 10,000 times denser than the sun, and it is conserved across every form of life, telling us something about how life began and how it was constrained to evolve. Henderson recommends the book as amazing and gripping, only criticising the publisher for the "pedestrian" quality of the design and printing.

The founder of Microsoft, Bill Gates, reviewed the book under the heading "This Biology Book Blew Me Away". It moved him to read two of Lane's other books, and to bring him to New York to interview him. Gates noted that "As much as I loved The Vital Question, it's not for everyone. Some of the explanations are pretty technical. But this is a technical subject, and I doubt anyone else will make it much easier to understand without sacrificing crucial details."

== Sources ==
- Lane, Nick (2016). The Vital Question: Why is Life the Way it is? (paperback ed.). Profile Books. ISBN 978-1-781-25037-2.
