= Jo Marchant =

British journalist

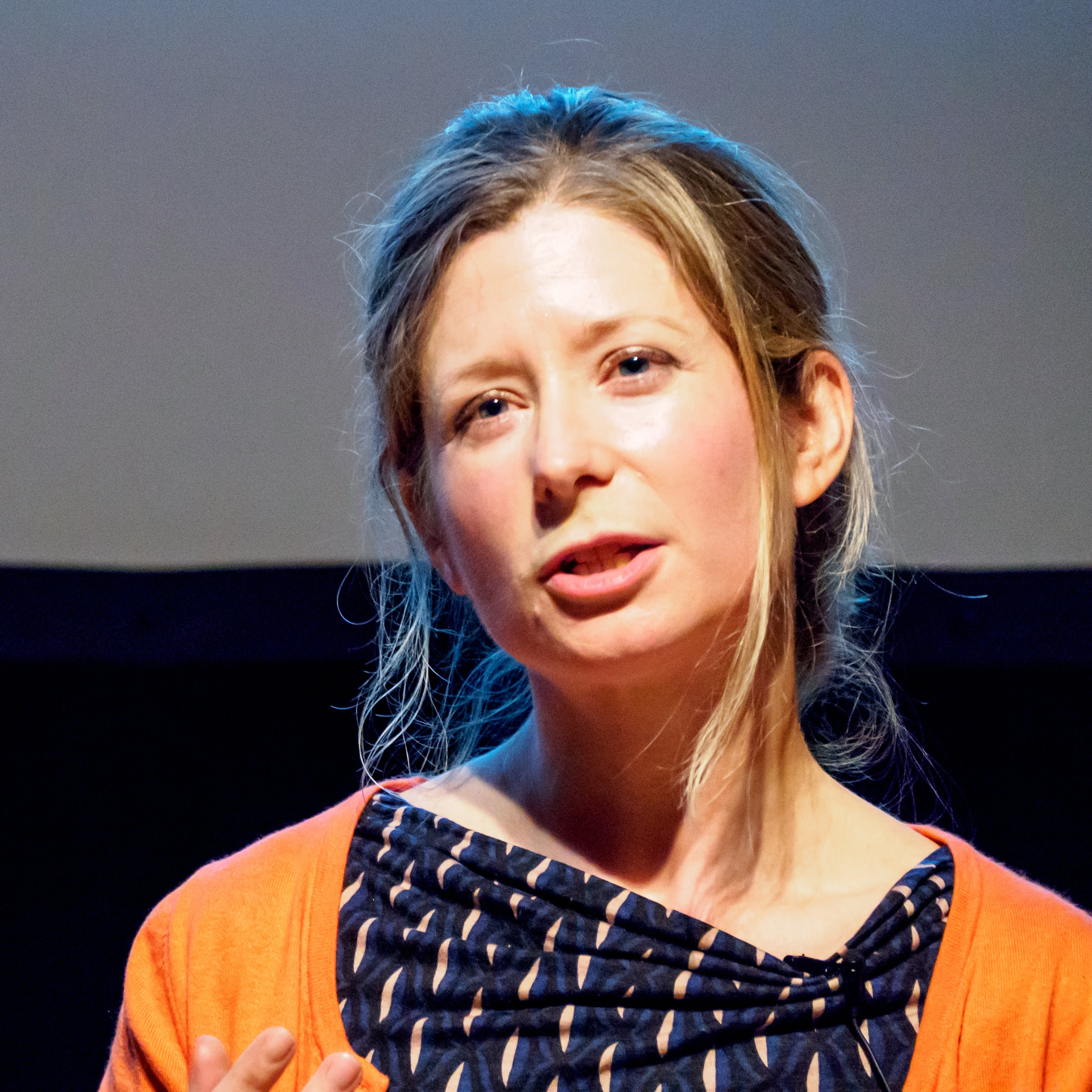
Jo Marchant in 2016

Jo Marchant is an English freelance journalist and author specialising in science and history. She holds a BSc in genetics from University of Leicester and a PhD in genetics.

== Career ==
Marchant began her career as a science writer and editor, serving as an editor at the science journal Nature and as opinion editor at New Scientist magazine in London. She has contributed to several major publications, including Scientific American, New Scientist, Aeon, and Smithsonian Magazine.

She is the author of several books, including:

- Decoding the Heavens (2009), an exploration of the history and significance of the Antikythera mechanism
- The Shadow King (2013), a study of the afterlife and scientific legacy of Tutankhamun
- Cure: A Journey into the Science of Mind Over Body (2016), which investigates the mind-body connection and was shortlisted for the Royal Society Insight Investment Science Book Prize in 2016
- The Human Cosmos: Civilization and the Stars (2020), which explores how the stars have shaped human history, imagination, and belief systems

Marchant has said the idea for her first book, *Decoding the Heavens*, "came about in November 2006, when I was an editor at the science journal Nature. A research paper was due to be published revealing the workings of a sophisticated ancient device called the Antikythera mechanism. The story grabbed me immediately, and I was desperate to find out more about this mysterious contraption. I travelled to Athens to see the remains of the mechanism, and to meet those who have studied it and hear their stories."

She was awarded the 2023 Watson, Helen, Miles, and Audrey Davis Prize by the History of Science Society for The Human Cosmos.

== Personal life ==
Marchant lives in Herne Hill, South London, with her partner and their two children.
