= 2020 in Brazil =

Events in the year 2020 in Brazil.

== Incumbents ==
=== Federal government ===
- President: Jair Bolsonaro
- Vice President: Hamilton Mourão

=== Governors ===
- Acre: Gladson Cameli
- Alagoas: Renan Filho
- Amapa: Waldez Góes
- Amazonas: Wilson Lima
- Bahia: Rui Costa (politician)
- Ceará: Camilo Santana
- Distrito Federal: Ibaneis Rocha
- Espírito Santo: Renato Casagrande
- Goiás: Ronaldo Caiado
- Maranhão: Flávio Dino
- Mato Grosso: Mauro Mendes
- Mato Grosso do Sul: Reinaldo Azambuja
- Minas Gerais: Romeu Zema
- Pará: Helder Barbalho
- Paraíba: João Azevêdo
- Paraná: Ratinho Júnior
- Pernambuco: Paulo Câmara
- Piauí: Wellington Dias
- Rio de Janeiro: Wilson Witzel & Cláudio Castro
- Rio Grande do Norte: Fátima Bezerra
- Rio Grande do Sul: Eduardo Leite
- Rondônia: Marcos Rocha
- Roraima: Antonio Denarium
- Santa Catarina: Carlos Moisés
- São Paulo: João Doria
- Sergipe: Belivaldo Chagas
- Tocantins: Mauro Carlesse

=== Vice governors ===
- Acre: Wherles Fernandes da Rocha
- Alagoas: José Luciano Barbosa da Silva
- Amapá: Jaime Domingues Nunes
- Amazonas: Carlos Alberto Souza de Almeida Filho
- Bahia: João Leão
- Ceará: Izolda Cela
- Espírito Santo: Jacqueline Moraes da Silva
- Goiás: Lincoln Graziane Pereira da Rocha
- Maranhão: Carlos Brandão
- Mato Grosso: Otaviano Olavo Pivetta
- Mato Grosso do Sul: Murilo Zauith
- Minas Gerais: Paulo Brant
- Pará: Lúcio Dutra Vale
- Paraíba: Lígia Feliciano
- Paraná: Darci Piana
- Pernambuco: Luciana Barbosa de Oliveira Santos
- Piaui: Regina Sousa
- Rio de Janeiro: Cláudio Castro
- Rio Grande do Norte: Antenor Roberto
- Rio Grande do Sul: Ranolfo Vieira Júnior
- Rondônia: José Atílio Salazar Martins
- Roraima: Frutuoso Lins Cavalcante Neto
- Santa Catarina: Daniela Cristina Reinehr
- São Paulo: Rodrigo Garcia
- Sergipe: Eliane Aquino Custódio
- Tocantins: Wanderlei Barbosa

== Events ==
=== January ===
- January 17: Special Secretary for Culture under the auspices of the Ministry of Tourism, Roberto Alvim, is fired after appearing to quote a speech by Nazi propagandist Joseph Goebbels in a government-sanctioned video.
- January 21: Journalist Glenn Greenwald (The Intercept) is charged with cybercrimes in connection to leaking telephone calls, audio, and text messages of prosecutors and other public officials in 2019.
- January 23: Subtropical Storm Kurumí forms.
- January 24: Heavy rains in Belo Horizonte and the metropolitan region leave at least 30 dead, 17 missing, and at least 2,500 evacuated from their homes.
- January 29: The United States Department of Homeland Security (DHS) says that it has started sending Brazilians back into Mexico as increasing numbers seek asylum in the U.S.

=== February ===
- February 10: Floods cause the main roads in São Paulo and the metropolitan region to close, resulting in interruptions in public transport and the cancellation of schools.
- February 13: The Ministry of Health warns of a possible dengue epidemic, after 57,485 cases were reported between January and February.
- February 18-24: 147 homicides are recorded in Ceará, while military police carry out riots.
- February 19: Senator Cid Gomes is shot in Sobral, Ceará during a riot carried out by the Military Police.
- February 21:
  - The United States of America resumes importing fresh beef from Brazil after a 3 year suspension due to problems with the application of the foot-and-mouth disease vaccine.
  - After 20 days on strike, oil workers suspend the act after an agreement with the Superior Labor Court.
- February 26: The Ministry of Health confirms the first case of coronavirus in Brazil. A 61-year-old man from São Paulo, became infected during a trip to Italy between February 9 and 21.
- February 29: The ship Anna Karoline III sinks in the south of Amapá, leaving 42 dead.

=== March ===
- March 2: Rain and landslides in Baixada Santista leave at least 27 people dead and 22 missing.
- March 4: Ronaldinho Gaúcho and his brother Assis are detained in Asunción, Paraguay for using fake passports.
- March 6: A Paraguayan court issues an arrest order against Ronaldinho and his brother Assis.
- March 12: For the first time, the US Dollar reaches 5.00 Brazilian Reals, due to the COVID-19 pandemic.
- March 17:
  - The São Paulo Health Department confirms the first death from the new coronavirus in Brazil. A 62-year-old man, who lived in the state capital and had diabetes, hypertension, and prostatic hyperplasia.
  - The CBF orders the suspension of the Copa do Brasil, Copa do Nordeste, Brazilian Women's Football Championship, the Brazilian U-17 Championship, and the Brazilian U-20 Cup, due to the new coronavirus pandemic. The State Championships are also suspended.

=== April ===
- April 16: Luiz Henrique Mandetta is fired as Minister of Health and oncologist Nelson Teich is appointed to the position.
- April 24: Sergio Moro resigns from the Ministry of Justice and Public Security and criticizes President Jair Bolsonaro, accusing him of political interference within the Federal Police. Hours later, Bolsonaro refutes the former minister by stating that he asked him to change command of the PF after Moro was nominated to the Supreme Federal Court. After the speech, Moro discusses the personal conversations he had with the President.

=== May ===
- May 3: Brazil reaches the 100,000 mark of confirmed COVID-19 cases.
- May 15: Nelson Teich resigns as the Minister of Health.
- May 16: General Eduardo Pazuello assumes the position of Health Minister.
- May 22: With over 330,000 infections, Brazil overtakes Russia to become the second country with the highest confirmed number of COVID-19 cases.

=== June ===
- June 10: A man armed with a knife and a Bible invaded Rede Globo's headquarters in Rio de Janeiro and briefly took reporter Marina Araújo hostage. His main target was Renata Vasconcellos, the anchor of Jornal Nacional, having even demanded to speak to her, as well as shouting slogans against the broadcaster. Military police would later arrest the individual and in a later statement, Rede Globo denied that the invasion was politically motivated.
- June 19: Brazil reaches 1 million confirmed cases of COVID-19.
- June 30: A "bomb cyclone" leaves at least ten dead in the southern region.

=== July ===
- July 2: A constitutional amendment is promulgated to postpone municipal elections, previously scheduled for the first and last Sunday of October; to November 15 and 29 (first and second rounds), due to the COVID-19 pandemic.

=== August ===
- August 28: Governor of Rio de Janeiro, Wilson Witzel, is removed by minister of the Superior Court of Justice, Benedito Gonçalves, on charges of deviations in the health sector during the COVID-19 pandemic in Rio de Janeiro. Vice-governor Cláudio Castro, also under investigation, assumes the role of interim governor.
- August 30: An earthquake with a 4.6 magnitude, hits the Recôncavo Baiano region, with an epicenter at Amargosa and Mutuípe.

=== September ===
- September 1: Record fires occur in the Pantanal.

=== October ===
- October 7: Confirmed COVID-19 cases in Brazil reach 5,000,000 and 148,300 deaths.
- October 26: Subtropical Storm Mani forms.

=== November ===
- November 3: A major blackout hits the entire state of Amapá.
- November 15: The first round of municipal elections take place in Brazil.
- November 19: A man named João Alberto Freitas is beaten and murdered by security guards at a Carrefour establishment in Porto Alegre.
- November 20: Several protests against the killing of João Alberto Freitas take place on Black Awareness Day.
- November 29: The second round of municipal elections take place in Brazil.

=== December ===
- December 28: Subtropical Storm Oquira forms.

== Deaths ==
=== January ===
- January 6: Luís Morais (Cabeção), 89, footballer (b. 1930)
- January 17: Claudio Roditi, 73, jazz trumpeter, cancer (b. 1946)

=== March ===
- March 25: Martinho Lutero Galati, 66, conductor (b. 1953); COVID-19.
- March 26: Naomi Munakata, 64, conductor (b. 1955); COVID-19.
- March 27: Daniel Azulay, 72, cartoonist (b. 1947); COVID-19.

=== April ===
- April 4: Florindo Corral, 70, businessperson; COVID-19
- April 14: Aldo di Cillo Pagotto, archbishop (b. 1949); COVID-19.
- April 21: Gerson Peres, journalist (b. 1931).
- April 25: Ricardo Brennand, art collector and entrepreneur (b. 1927).
- April 27: Asdrubal Bentes, politician (b. 1939).

=== May ===
- May 1: Fernando Sandoval, water polo player (b. 1942).
- May 4: Aldir Blanc, composer (b. 1946).
- May 5: Ciro Pessoa, singer-songwriter (b. 1957).
- May 7: Daisy Lúcidi, actress (b. 1929).
- May 8:
  - Lúcia Braga, politician (b. 1934).
  - Vicente André Gomes, politician and physician (b. 1952).
- May 9:
  - Carlos José, singer-songwriter (b. 1934).
  - Abraham Palatnik, artist (b. 1928).
- May 10:
  - David Corrêa, singer-songwriter (b. 1937).
  - Sérgio Sant'Anna, writer (b. 1941).

=== August ===
- August 5:
  - Gésio Amadeu, 73, actor (b. 1947); COVID-19
  - Aritana Yawalapiti, 71, indigenous rights activist, cacique, and ecologist (b. 1949); COVID-19

=== December ===
- December 20: Nicette Bruno, actress (b. 1933)
