= 1947 in Brazil =

Events in the year 1947 in Brazil.

== Incumbents ==
=== Federal government ===
- President: Marshal Eurico Gaspar Dutra
- Vice President: Nereu Ramos

=== Governors ===
- Alagoas:
  - Antonio Guedes de Miranda (until 29 March)
  - Silvestre Pericles (from 29 March)
- Amazonas:
  - Siseno Sarmento (until 1 March)
  - João Nogueira da Mata (1 March-8 May)
  - Leopoldo da Silva Amorim Neves (from 8 May)
- Bahia:
  - Cândido Caldas (until 10 April)
  - Otávio Mangabeira (from 10 April)
- Ceará:
  - José Machado Lopes (until 3 February)
  - José Feliciano de Ataíde (3 February-1 March)
  - Faustino de Albuquerque (from 1 March)
- Espírito Santo:
  - Moacir Ubirajara da Silva (until 29 March)
  - Carlos Fernando Monteiro Lindenberg (from 29 March)
- Goiás:
  - Joaquim Machado de Araújo (until 22 March)
  - Jerônimo Coimbra Bueno (from 22 March)
- Maranhão: Saturnino Bello
- Mato Grosso:
  - Jose Marcelo Moreira (until 8 April)
  - Arnaldo Estêvão de Figueiredo (from 8 April)
- Minas Gerais:
  - Alcides Lins (until 19 March)
  - Milton Soares Campos (from 19 March)
- Pará:
  - José Faustino Santos (until 11 March)
  - Luís de Moura Carvalho (from 11 March)
- Paraíba:
  - José Gomes da Silva (until 4 March)
  - Osvaldo Trigueiro (from 4 March)
- Paraná:
  - Mário Gomes (until 6 February)
  - Antônio Augusto de Carvalho Chaves (6 February-12 March)
  - Moisés Lupion (from 12 March)
- Pernambuco: Demerval Peixoto
- Rio de Janeiro: Hugo Silva
- Rio Grande do Norte:
  - Ubaldo Bezerra de Melo (until 15 January)
  - Orestes da Rocha Lima (15 January-31 July)
  - José Augusto Varela (from 31 July)
- Rio Grande do Sul:
  - Pompílio Cylon Fernandes Rosa (until 26 March)
  - Walter Só Jobim (from 26 March)
- Santa Catarina: Aderbal Ramos da Silva
- São Paulo:
  - José Carlos de Macedo Soares (until 14 March)
  - Ademar de Barros (from 14 March)
- Sergipe:
  - Antônio de Freitas Brandão (until 30 January)
  - Joaquim Sabino Ribeiro (30 January-29 March)
  - Jose Rollemberg (from 29 March)

=== Vice governors ===
- Ceará: Osvaldo da Costa e Silva
- Espírito Santo: José Rodrigues Sette
- Goiás: Hosanah de Campos Guimarães
- Maranhão: Saturnino Bello (from 22 October)
- Minas Gerais: José Ribeiro Pena (from 4 September)
- Paraíba: José Targino Pereira da Costa (from 1947)
- Piauí: Osvaldo da Costa e Silva (from 28 April)
- Rio Grande do Norte: Tomaz Salustino (from 31 July)
- São Paulo: Luís Gonzaga Novelli Júnior (from 28 November)

== Events ==
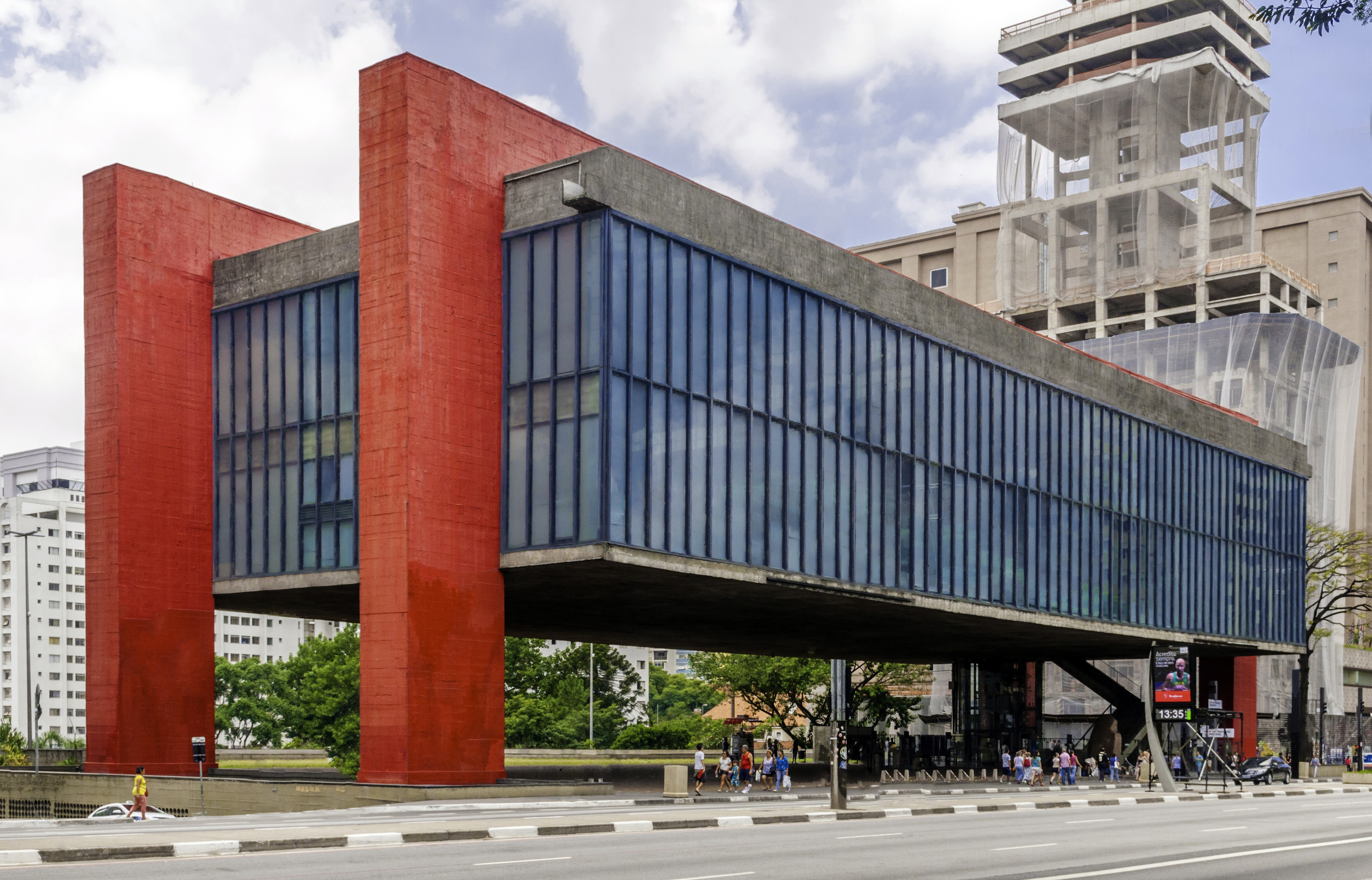
São Paulo Museum of Art, opened 2 October

=== January ===
- 19 January: Parliamentary elections are held, for 19 vacant seats in the Chamber of Deputies, one additional Senator for each state (except Santa Catarina, which elected two), and for all state governors and legislatures. The Brazilian Communist Party win nearly 10% of the vote in the state elections, becoming the third party in the state of São Paulo (ahead of the UDN) and the single largest party in the federal capital, Rio de Janeiro.

=== May ===
- 7 May:
  - President Eurico Gaspar Dutra signs a decree-law, suspending the functioning of the General Command of Workers.
  - The Superior Electoral Court decides to cancel the registration of the Communist Party of Brazil.
- 31 May: The South American Basketball Championship 1947 begins in Rio de Janeiro.

=== June ===
- 17 June: The South American Basketball Championship 1947 ends in Rio de Janeiro.

=== August ===
- 6 August: The Brazilian Socialist Party is founded.

=== October ===
- 2 October: Journalist Assis Chateaubriand and painter Pietro Maria Bardi open the São Paulo Museum of Art to the public.

=== December ===
- 22 December: The airline Lóide Aéreo Nacional is founded by Ruy Vacani.

== Arts and culture ==
=== Books ===
- Mario de Andrade - Contos Novos (posthumously published)

=== Films ===
- The End of the River (British film made in Brazil), directed by Derek Twist

=== Music ===
- Valdir Azevedo - "Brasileirinho"

== Births ==
=== January ===
- 1 January - Miriam Batucada, singer (d. 1994)
- 8 January - Rosa Magalhães, professor and artist
- 25 January - Tostão, footballer

=== February ===
- 4 February - Garibaldi Alves Filho, politician
- 5 February - Regina Duarte, actress and politician
- 21 February - Renata Sorrah, actress

=== June ===
- 18 June - Antonio Galves, mathematician (d. 2023)
- 30 June - Fuad Noman, writer and politician (d. 2025)

=== July ===
- 16 July - Valnice Milhomens, pastor, apostle, author and televangelist
- 26 July - Siron Franco, painter, designer and sculptor

=== August ===
- 24 August - Paulo Coelho, novelist

=== October ===
- 17 October - Nuno Leal Maia, actor

=== December ===
- 14 December - Dilma Rousseff, 36th President of Brazil
- 31 December - Rita Lee, singer (d. 2023)

== Deaths ==
=== January ===
- 12 January - Júlio Afrânio Peixoto, physician, politician and writer (born 1876)

=== April ===
- 21 April - Heitor da Silva Costa, civil engineer, designer and constructor of the Christ the Redeemer monument in Rio de Janeiro (born 1873)

=== July ===
- 21 July - Johann Baptist Reus, German-Brazilian Jesuit leader (born 1868)

== See also ==
- 1947 in Brazilian football
- List of Brazilian films of 1947
