= Carlos André (footballer, born 1987) =

Brazilian footballer

Personal information
- Full name: Carlos André Santos de Jesus
- Date of birth: 7 February 1987 (age 39)
- Place of birth: Mutuípe, Brazil
- Height: 1.88 m (6 ft 2 in)
- Position: Centre-back

Senior career*
Years	Team	Apps	(Gls)
2007	Fortaleza		
2007–2008	Nelas		
2008	Beira-Mar		
2009	Nelas		
2009–2010	Tondela	2	(0)
2010–2011	Olympiakos Nicosia	7	(0)
2011–2013	Tondela	47	(1)
2014	Recreativo da Caála	7	(0)
2015	Benfica e Castelo Branco	9	(0)
2015–2016	Barreirense		
2016	Bangkok	18	(1)
2016–2017	Fátima	9	(1)
2018	Concórdia		
2019	Vitória da Conquista		
2019	Fabril Barreiro	2	(0)
- * Club domestic league appearances and goals

Carlos André Santos de Jesus, known as Carlos André (born 27 February 1987) is a Brazilian former footballer who played as a centre-back. He also holds Portuguese citizenship.

== Career ==
Carlos André made his professional debut in the Cypriot First Division for Olympiakos Nicosia on 16 January 2011 in a game against Anorthosis Famagusta.
