= Munakata =

Munakata may refer to:

- Munakata (surname)
- Munakata, Fukuoka, a city in Japan
- Munakata Taisha, a Shinto shrine in Fukuoka
