= 1947 São Paulo FC season =

São Paulo
1947 season
- Chairman: Roberto Gomes Pedroza; Paulo Machado de Carvalho
- Manager: Joreca; Alberto Zarzur; Vicente Feola
- Campeonato Paulista: 4th

The 1947 football season was São Paulo's 18th season since the club's founding in 1930.

== Overall ==
Games played	40 (20 Campeonato Paulista, 20 Friendly match)
Games won	16 (8 Campeonato Paulista, 8 Friendly match)
Games drawn	13 (9 Campeonato Paulista, 4 Friendly match)
Games lost	11 (3 Campeonato Paulista, 8 Friendly match)
Goals scored	92
Goals conceded	73
Goal difference	+19
Best result	8–2 (H) v Jabaquara – Campeonato Paulista – 1947.11.09
Worst result	2–7 (A) v Bahia – Friendly match – 1947.10.26
Most appearances	
Top scorer	

Source: São Paulo FC

== Friendlies ==
January 4 International	São Paulo (Brazil)	0–1	(Argentina) Boca Juniors	São Paulo
			Goal	Stadium: Estádio Paulo Machado de Carvalho (Pacaembu)

January 22 National	Atlético Mineiro	3–1	São Paulo	Belo Horizonte
	Goal		Goal	Stadium: Estádio Presidente Antônio Carlos (de Lourdes)

January 26 National	São Paulo (Brazil)	1–1	(Paraguay) Sol de América	São Paulo
	Goal		Goal	Stadium: Estádio Palestra Itália (Parque Antártica)

April 9 National	Santos	1–6	São Paulo	São Paulo
	Goal		Goal	Stadium: Estádio Paulo Machado de Carvalho (Pacaembu)

April 16 Taça Cidade de São Paulo	Corinthians	5–1	São Paulo	São Paulo
	Goal		Goal	Stadium: Estádio Paulo Machado de Carvalho (Pacaembu)

April 20 Taça Cidade de São Paulo	São Paulo	1–0	Portuguesa	São Paulo
	Goal			Stadium: Estádio Paulo Machado de Carvalho (Pacaembu)

April 21 National	Francana	4–5	São Paulo	Franca
	Goal		Goal

April 27 Taça Cidade de São Paulo	São Paulo	2–3	Corinthians	São Paulo
	Goal		Goal	Stadium: Estádio Paulo Machado de Carvalho (Pacaembu)

May 1 National	Flamengo	2–2	São Paulo	Rio de Janeiro
	Goal		Goal	Stadium: Estádio Vasco da Gama (São Januário)

May 4 Taça Cidade de São Paulo	Portuguesa	0–4	São Paulo	São Paulo
			Goal	Stadium: Estádio Paulo Machado de Carvalho (Pacaembu)

May 14 National	Palmeiras	1–2	São Paulo	São Paulo
	Goal		Goal	Stadium: Estádio Paulo Machado de Carvalho (Pacaembu)

May 27 National	São Paulo	1–1	Atlético Mineiro	São Paulo
	Goal		Goal	Stadium: Estádio Paulo Machado de Carvalho (Pacaembu)

June 3 National	São Paulo	1–4	Atlético Mineiro	São Paulo
	Goal		Goal	Stadium: Estádio Paulo Machado de Carvalho (Pacaembu)

June 29 Taça Castellões	Botafogo-SP	1–2	São Paulo	Ribeirão Preto
	Goal		Goal	Stadium: Estádio Luís Pereira (Vila Tibério)

July 10 National	São Paulo	3–4	Botafogo-RJ	São Paulo
	Goal		Goal	Stadium: Estádio Paulo Machado de Carvalho (Pacaembu)

July 13 National	America-RJ	5–1	São Paulo	Curitiba
	Goal		Goal	Stadium: Estádio do Ferroviário

September 21 National	Sanjoanense	1–1	São Paulo	São João da Boa Vista
	Goal		Goal

October 26 Taça Mangabeira	Bahia	7–2	São Paulo	Salvador
	Goal		Goal	Stadium: Campo da Graça

October 30 Taça Mangabeira	Bahia	1–2	São Paulo	Salvador
	Goal		Goal	Stadium: Campo da Graça

November 19 International	São Paulo (Brazil)	6–1	(Uruguay) Miramar	São Paulo
	Goal		Goal	Stadium: Estádio Paulo Machado de Carvalho (Pacaembu)

== Official competitions ==
=== Campeonato Paulista ===
May 25 1	São Paulo	3–1	Comercial	São Paulo
	Goal		Goal	Stadium: Estádio Paulo Machado de Carvalho (Pacaembu)

May 31 2	São Paulo	1–1	Nacional	São Paulo
	Goal		Goal	Stadium: Estádio Paulo Machado de Carvalho (Pacaembu)

June 15 3	São Paulo	3–3	Portuguesa	São Paulo
	Goal		Goal	Stadium: Estádio Paulo Machado de Carvalho (Pacaembu)

June 22 4	São Paulo	7–2	Juventus	São Paulo
	Goal		Goal	Stadium: Estádio Paulo Machado de Carvalho (Pacaembu)

July 5 5	São Paulo	2–3	Ypiranga	São Paulo
	Goal		Goal	Stadium: Estádio Paulo Machado de Carvalho (Pacaembu)

July 20 6	Jabaquara	2–2	São Paulo	Santos
	Goal		Goal	Stadium: Estádio Ulrico Mursa

July 27 7	São Paulo	1–1	Santos	São Paulo
	Goal		Goal	Stadium: Estádio Paulo Machado de Carvalho (Pacaembu)

August 17 8	São Paulo	3–4	Palmeiras	São Paulo
	Goal		Goal	Stadium: Estádio Paulo Machado de Carvalho (Pacaembu)

August 31 9	Portuguesa Santista	1–1	São Paulo	Santos
	Goal		Goal	Stadium: Estádio Ulrico Mursa

September 14 10	Corinthians	1–1	São Paulo	São Paulo
	Goal		Goal	Stadium: Estádio Paulo Machado de Carvalho (Pacaembu)

September 28 11	Santos	1–1	São Paulo	Santos
	Goal		Goal	Stadium: Estádio Urbano Caldeira (Vila Belmiro)

October 12 12	Ypiranga	0–1	São Paulo	São Paulo
			Goal	Stadium: Estádio Paulo Machado de Carvalho (Pacaembu)

October 19 13	Portuguesa	0–0	São Paulo	São Paulo
				Stadium: Estádio Paulo Machado de Carvalho (Pacaembu)

November 9 14	São Paulo	8–2	Jabaquara	São Paulo
	Goal		Goal	Stadium: Estádio Paulo Machado de Carvalho (Pacaembu)

November 15 15	Nacional	1–2	São Paulo	São Paulo
	Goal		Goal	Stadium: Estádio Paulo Machado de Carvalho (Pacaembu)

November 30 16	Comercial	0–5	São Paulo	São Paulo
			Goal	Stadium: Estádio Paulo Machado de Carvalho (Pacaembu)

December 6 17	São Paulo	4–0	Portuguesa Santista	São Paulo
	Goal			Stadium: Estádio Paulo Machado de Carvalho (Pacaembu)

December 14 18	Palmeiras	1–1	São Paulo	São Paulo
	Goal		Goal	Stadium: Estádio Paulo Machado de Carvalho (Pacaembu)

December 27 19	Juventus	2–1	São Paulo	São Paulo
	Goal		Goal	Stadium: Estádio Paulo Machado de Carvalho (Pacaembu)

January 4, 1948 20	São Paulo	1–1	Corinthians	São Paulo
	Goal		Goal	Stadium: Estádio Paulo Machado de Carvalho (Pacaembu)

==== Record ====
Final Position	Points	Matches	Wins	Draws	Losses	Goals For	Goals Away	Win%
4th	25	20	7	10	3	48	27	52%
