= Augusto Montenegro Mansion =

- Palacete Augusto Montenegro
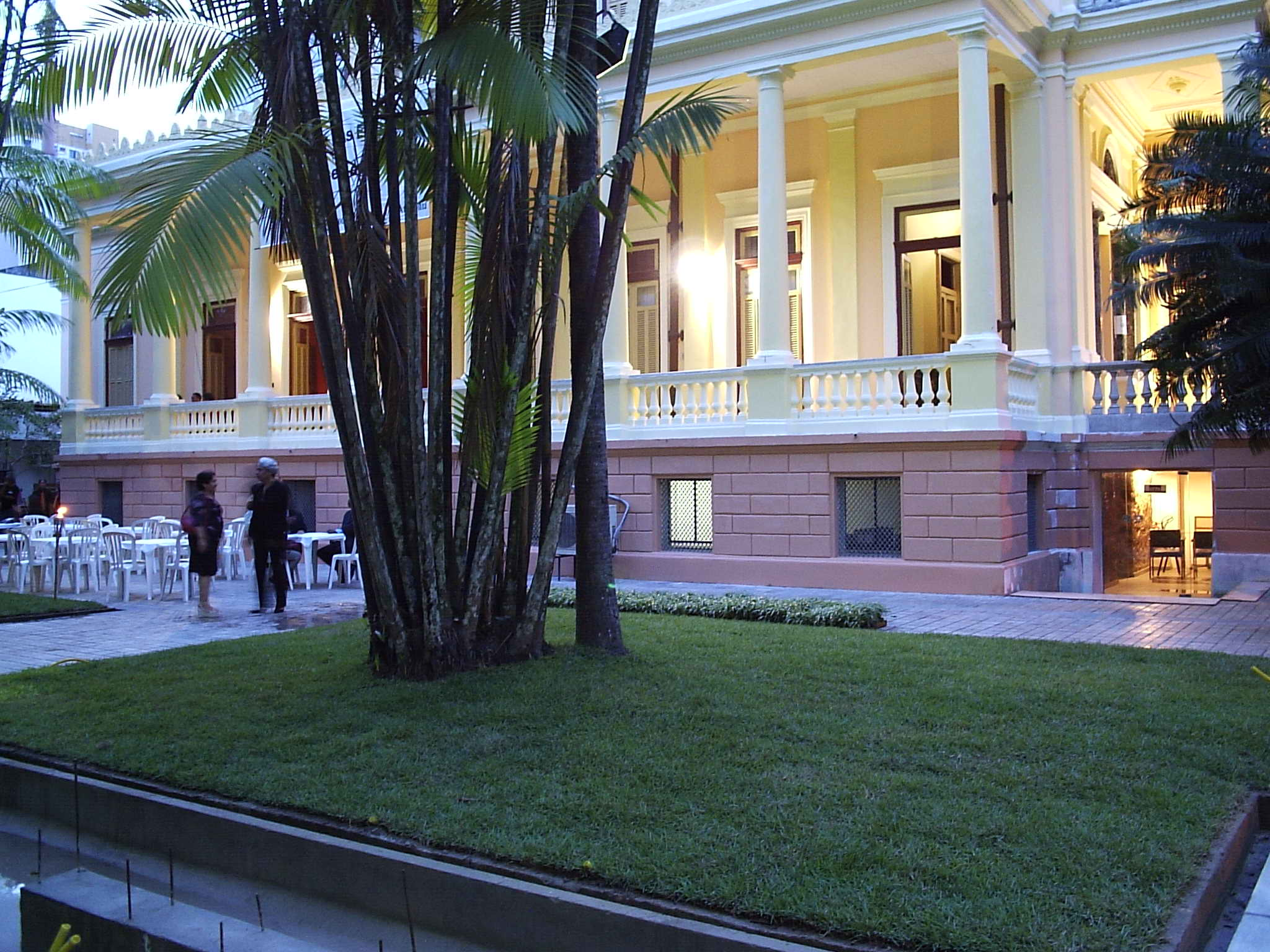
- Augusto Montenegro Mansion (Palacete Augusto Montenegro), Belém, Pará, Brazil

- Location within Brazil

General information
- Type: mansion
- Architectural style: Eclectic
- Location: Avenida Governador José Malcher nº 1192 - Nazaré, Belém-PA, Pará, Belém, Pará, Brazil
- Coordinates: 1.450292°S 48.483128°W
- Inaugurated: 1903
- Owner: Federal University of Pará

Design and construction
- Architect: Filinto Santoro

The Augusto Montenegro Mansion (Portuguese: Palacete Augusto Montenegro), also known as the Montenegro Mansion, is a historic residence in Belém, Pará, Brazil. It was completed in 1903 for Governor Augusto Montenegro (1867-1915). It is one of numerous structures built in Belém in the eclecticism during the Amazonian "rubber cycle" in the early 20th century. The mansion now houses the Museum of the Federal University of Pará. It was listed as a historic structure by the Department of Historic, Artistic and Cultural Heritage of Pará in 2002.

== History ==
The Montenegro Mansion is one of numerous mansions built in Belém by traders and politicians associated with the rubber trade of the Amazon region. It was built by the Italian architect Filinto Santoro for governor Augusto Montenegro. The mansion remained a residence of wealthy families in Belém until the 1960s. The Montenegro Mansion was then purchased by the Federal University of Pará and served as the office of the dean. In 1983 the structure reopened as the Museum of the Federal University of Pará.

== Protected status ==
The Montenegro Mansion was listed as a historic structure by the Department of Historic, Artistic and Cultural Heritage of the state of Pará in 2002.
