= Luiz Peixoto Ramos =

- Born: April 15, 1941 (age 85); João Pessoa, Paraíba, Brazil
- Occupations: Novelist, poet, and songwriter
- Writing career
- Language: Portuguese

Luiz Peixoto Ramos (João Pessoa, April 15, 1941) is a Brazilian writer and songwriter, best known for the character "Jabutigão."

== Biography ==
In 1961, he spent some time in Belém and then returned to Paraíba. In 1964, he released his first record, a single that included the songs Abraço Eterno (bolero) and Porque existe saudade (twist).

In 1987, he received an honorable mention for the poem Sou at the floral games of the "Poets of the Lusophone World" in Massachusetts, United States. That same year, he published his first book, Levitando na poesia, at the Academia Paraense de Letras (APL). In 1992, he published his third book, Êxtase, at the APL.

In 1995, he released his second album, Delírio, featuring popular songs, at the art center of the Federal University of Pará (UFPA) in São Paulo.

In 1997, he launched his fourth book, Reflexos do dia-a-dia, at the Academia Paraense de Letras. That same year, he participated in the book Introdução à literatura no Pará, the seventh volume of the APL. In 1998, he released the second edition of Reflexos do dia-a-dia at the APL.

In November 1999, during the III Pan-Amazon Fair, he launched the book Um conto de fadas amazônico. It was classified in the VII short story contest of the Northern region as one of the storytellers of the Amazon, with the story O Segredo, promoted by the art center of the University of Pará. In 2000, he reedited Um conto de fadas amazônico.

== See also ==
- Brazilian literature
- Brazilian music
