= Gerson Peres =

Brazilian politician, lawyer, and journalist (1931–2020)

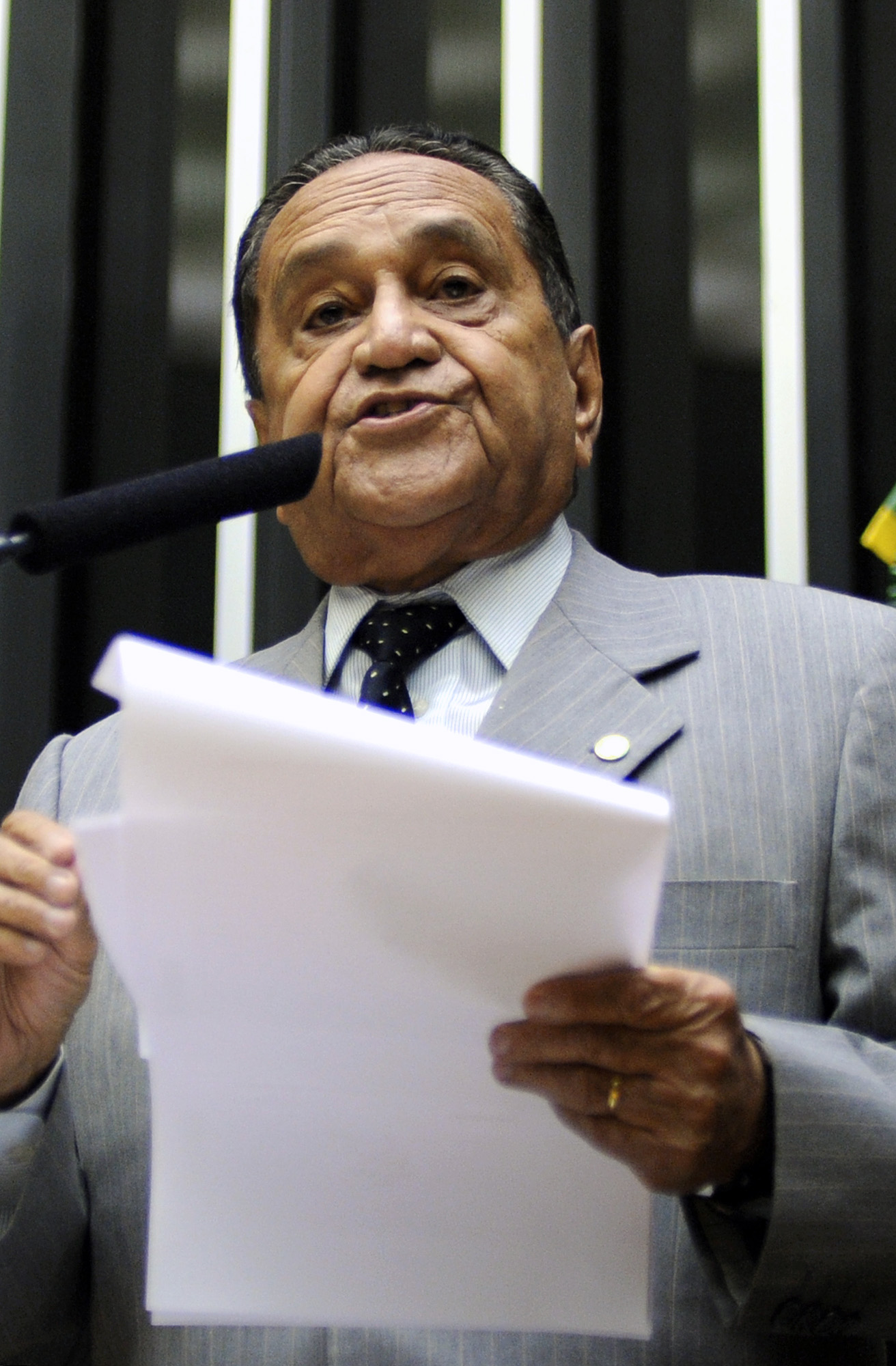

Member of the Chamber of Deputies from Pará
- In office 1 February 1983 – 31 January 2003
- In office 1 February 2007 – 31 December 2011

Vice Governor of Pará
- In office 15 March 1979 – 31 January 1983
- Governor: Alacid Nunes
- Preceded by: Clóvis Rego
- Succeeded by: Laércio Franco

Member of the Legislative Assembly of Pará
- In office 1955–1979

Personal details
- Born: Gerson dos Santos Peres; May 2, 1931 Cametá, Pará, Brazil
- Died: April 21, 2020 (aged 88) Belém, Pará, Brazil
- Party: Progressistas (PP)
- Other political affiliations: PTB (former); UDN (former); ARENA (former); PDS (former)
- Spouse: Gracinda Dias Peres
- Education: Federal University of Pará
- Profession: Politician, lawyer, journalist

Gerson dos Santos Peres (2 May 1931 – 21 April 2020) was a Brazilian politician, lawyer and journalist from the state of Pará.

== Life ==
Gerson Peres was a lawyer by formation after finishing his law degree at Federal University of Pará, however outside of his political career he worked mostly as a journalist, employed by well known local newspapers such as O Liberal and A Província do Pará.

As a politician, his first public position was as a member of the Legislative Assembly of Pará, which he held from 1955 to 1979.

In 1978, Peres was indirectly elected Vice Governor of Pará, took office in 1979 and finished his tenure in 1983.

In 1982, he was elected member of the Chamber of Deputies representing his birth state of Pará and after 4 consecutive successful re-elections he remained a deputy until the end of his tenure in 2003.

In 2002, Peres chose not to seek re-election as a deputy and instead opted to run for a seat in the Brazilian Senate at the 2002 Brazilian general elections. This time his attempt was unsuccessful.

After his failure to secure a seat at the Brazilian Senate, he was once again elected member of the Chamber of Deputies. He remained at the Brazilian lower house from 2007 to 2011 and that was his last political position.

== Death ==
On 21 April 2020, Peres died in Belém from COVID-19 during the COVID-19 pandemic in Brazil.
