= Munakata (surname) =

Munakata (written: 棟方 or 宗像) is a Japanese surname. Notable people with the surname include:

- Koju Munakata (棟方 公寿, born 1967), Japanese basketball player and coach
- Naomi Munakata (1955–2020), Japanese-Brazilian choral conductor
- Shikō Munakata (棟方 志功, 1903–1975), Japanese artist
- Tadashi Munakata (宗像 政, 1854–1918), Japanese politician
- Uichi Munakata (宗像 卯一, 1915–?), Japanese basketball player
- Yuko Munakata, American psychologist

== Fictional characters ==
- Kyosuke Munakata (宗方 京助), a character in the video game Danganronpa 3: The End of Hope's Peak High School
- Reisi Munakata (宗像 礼司), a character in the anime series K
- Ryozo Munakata, a character in the video game Fatal Frame II: Crimson Butterfly
