= Asdrubal Bentes =

Brazilian politician and lawyer (1939–2020)

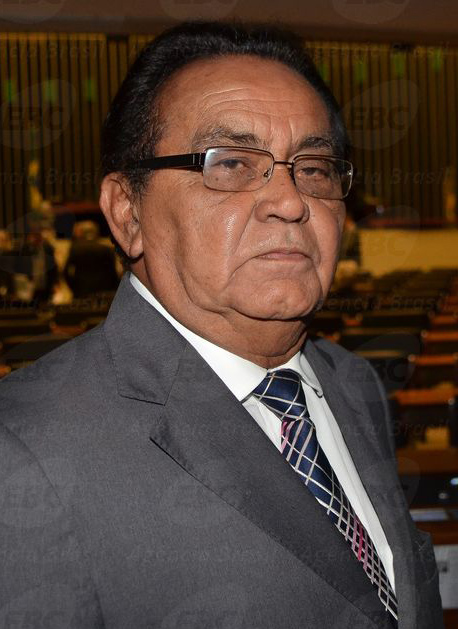
- Asdrubal Bentes in 2014

Member of the Chamber of Deputies from Pará
- In office 1 February 2001 – 26 March 2014
- In office 1 February 1997 – 31 January 1999
- In office 1 February 1987 – 31 January 1991

Personal details
- Born: Asdrubal Mendes Bentes; July 27, 1939 Humaitá, Amazonas, Brazil
- Died: April 27, 2020 (aged 80) Belém, Pará, Brazil
- Party: Brazilian Democratic Movement (MDB)
- Education: Federal University of Pará

Asdrubal Mendes Bentes (27 July 1939 – 27 April 2020) was a Brazilian politician and lawyer from the state of Pará.

== Life ==
He represented Pará in the national Chamber of Deputies, the lower house of the National Congress of Brazil, for several tenures beginning in 1987. Most recently, he served in the Chamber of Deputies for four consecutive terms from 1 February 2001, to 26 March 2014. He was also a former president of the Paysandu Sport Club, a Brazilian football team based in Belém.

== Death ==
Bentes was hospitalized in a Belém intensive care unit for COVID-19 during the COVID-19 pandemic in Brazil on 23 April 2020. He died from complications of COVID-19 at the Hospital Aberlardo Santos in the Icoaraci district of Belém on April 27, 2020, at the age of 80.
