= June 2020 Brazil bomb cyclone =

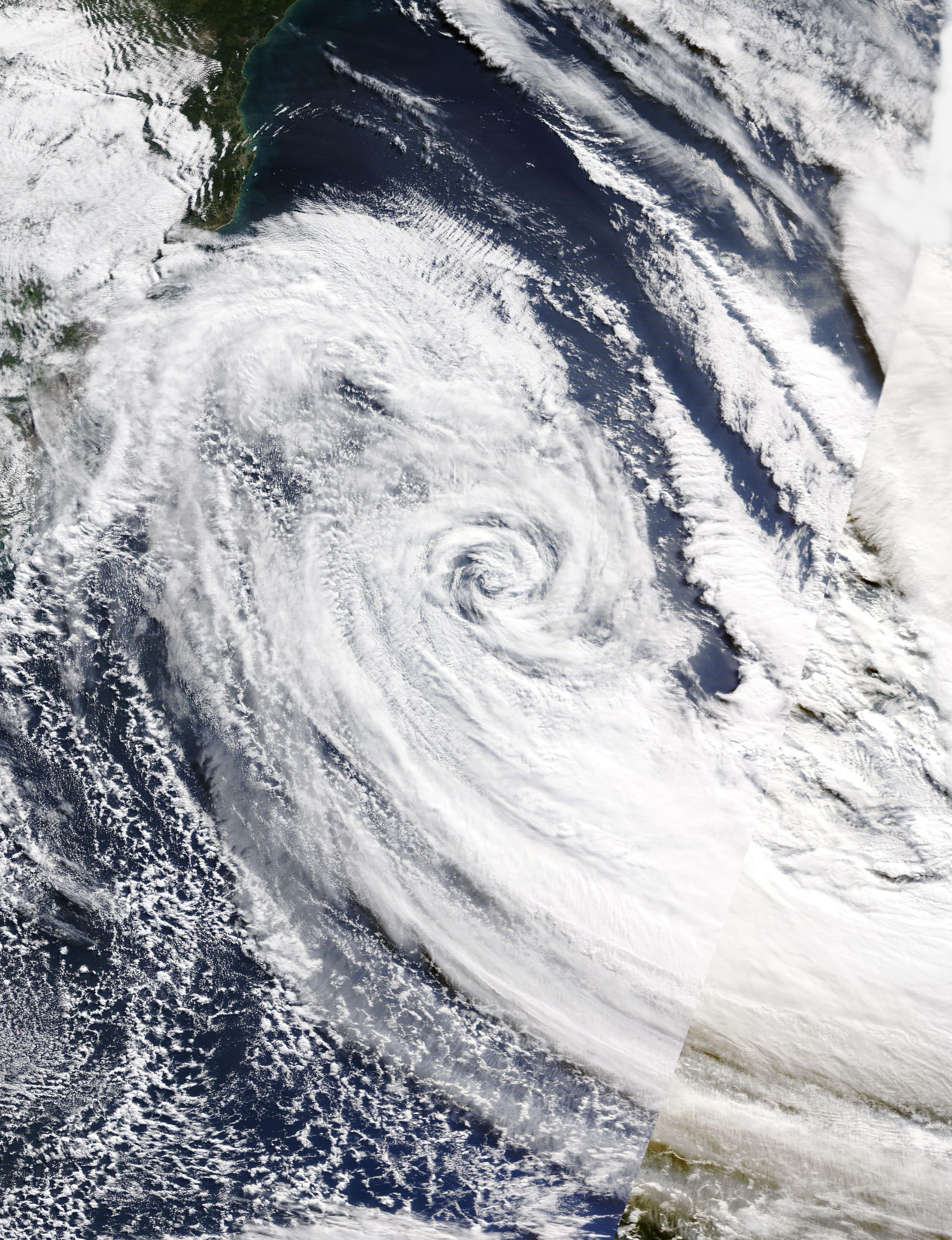
- Satellite image of the system impacting Brazil on July 1, 2020

Meteorological history
- Formed: 30 June 2020
- Dissipated: 3 July 2020

Extratropical cyclone
- Highest winds: 140 km/h (85 mph) (1-minute sustained winds)
- Lowest pressure: 976 hPa (mbar); 28.82 inHg

Overall effects
- Fatalities: 12 fatalities
- Damage: Unknown
- Areas affected: Rio Grande do Sul, Santa Catarina, Paraná, São Paulo, Rio de Janeiro
- Power outages: >1.9 million

The June 2020 bomb cyclone was a hurricane-force extratropical cyclone in South Region, Brazil which impacted the states of Santa Catarina, Rio Grande do Sul and Paraná on June 30, 2020. Twelve deaths were confirmed, ten in Santa Catarina, one in Rio Grande do Sul and one in Paraná. In addition to almost 1.9 million consumers without electricity in the three states.

== Meteorological history ==
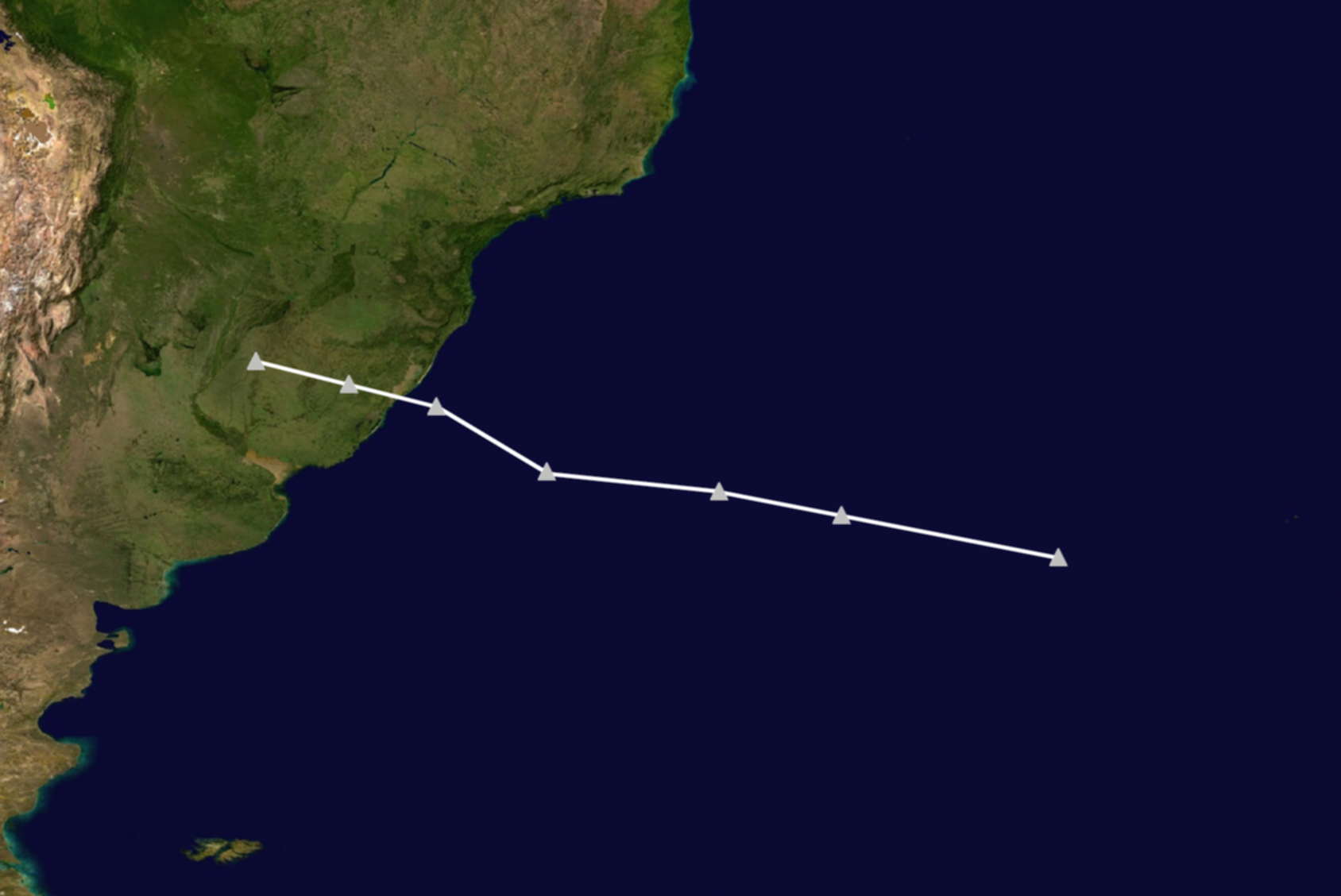
Map plotting the storm's track and intensity, according to the Saffir–Simpson scale Map key Saffir–Simpson scale Tropical depression (≤38 mph, ≤62 km/h) Tropical storm (39–73 mph, 63–118 km/h) Category 1 (74–95 mph, 119–153 km/h) Category 2 (96–110 mph, 154–177 km/h) Category 3 (111–129 mph, 178–208 km/h) Category 4 (130–156 mph, 209–251 km/h) Category 5 (≥157 mph, ≥252 km/h) Unknown Storm type Tropical cyclone Subtropical cyclone Extratropical cyclone, remnant low, tropical disturbance, or monsoon depression

During strong storms that hit the South Region of Brazil on June 30, 2020, cities registered winds of more than 120 km/h in several points of Santa Catarina, Rio Grande do Sul and Paraná. The cyclone originated over the Atlantic Ocean as an extratropical low-pressure system. Extensive rainfall measuring 140mm in 24 hours increased the water levels above flood levels in some areas of Rio Grande do Sul. This phenomenon is known as bomb cyclone, because in this region a sharp drop in atmospheric pressure was recorded over a period of 24 hours, causing cyclones that were not predictable by meteorologists. The storm developed rapidly, with atmospheric pressure changing from 1020 hPa to 996 hPa within 24 hours. This represents a decrease of at least 24 hPa, a situation described as relatively uncommon by INMET.

== Impacts ==
Animation of Brazil bomb cyclone.

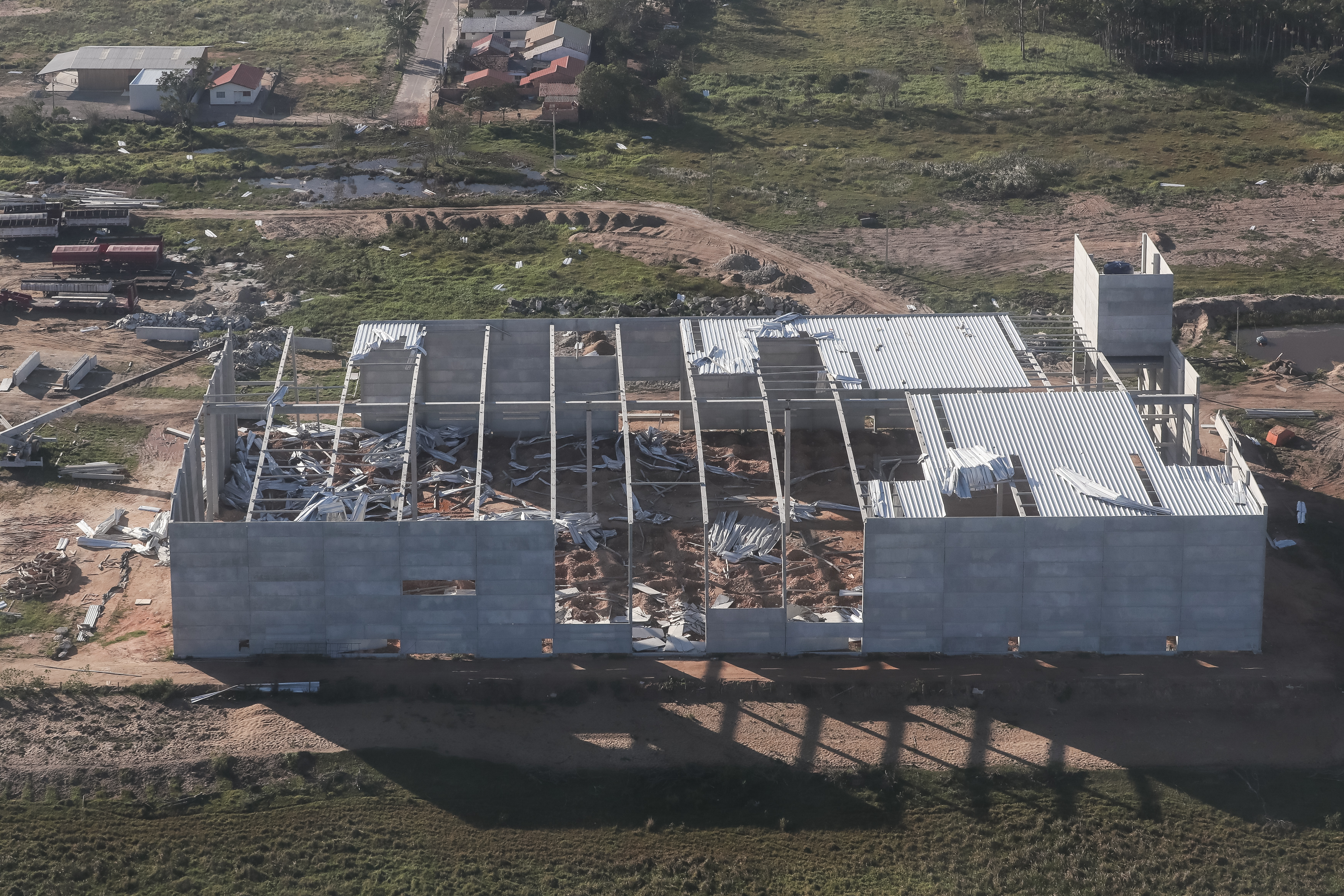
Shed without roofing tiles

Until 9pm BRT on the 30th, three deaths were registered as a result of cyclones in Santa Catarina, one in the city of Chapecó, one in Santo Amaro da Imperatriz and one in Tijucas, besides one death in Rio Grande do Sul, in the city of Nova Prata. The city hall recorded that 68% of the population (7312 inhabitants) were affected by these disasters. The wind disaster on July 1st made 118 homeless people, of whom 13 people required public shelter. Meanwhile, the flash flood resulted from the extreme rainfalls on July 7th left 70 homeless people, among which 10 families required public shelter. Residents of Praia Grande and Mampituba reported that the strongest winds occurred between 11:00 p.m and July 1st and 3:00 a.m on July 2nd.

Agricultural losses were also reported in Mampituba. The disaster completely destroyed 80% of banana agriculture and 10% of passion fruit agriculture. The most intense rainfall occurred in the central-north and central-east portions of the concession area, particularly on June 30th, when totals exceeded 100 mm over 24 hours. The first interruption began on June 29th, while the final interruption ended on July 14.

== See also ==
- Explosive cyclogenesis
- Hurricane Catarina
- November 2014 Bering Sea cyclone
- October 2022 Southern Ocean cyclone
