= Fernando Sandoval =

Brazilian water polo player (1942–2020)

Personal information
- Born: 18 November 1942; São Paulo, Brazil
- Died: 1 May 2020 (aged 77); São Paulo, Brazil

Sport
- Sport: Water polo

Fernando Sandoval (18 November 1942 – 1 May 2020) was a Brazilian water polo player. He competed in the men's tournament at the 1968 Summer Olympics. He died from complications due to COVID-19 during the COVID-19 pandemic in Brazil.
