= Vicente André Gomes =

Brazilian politician and physician (1952–2020)

Member of the Municipal Chamber of Recife
- In office 1985–1995
- In office 2005–2016

President of the Municipal Chamber of Recife
- In office 2013–2016
- Preceded by: Jurandir Liberal
- Succeeded by: Eduardo Marques

Member of the Chamber of Deputies from Pernambuco
- In office 1 February 1995 – 31 January 1999

Personal details
- Born: January 18, 1952 Recife, Pernambuco, Brazil
- Died: May 8, 2020 (aged 68) Recife, Pernambuco, Brazil
- Party: Brazilian Socialist Party (PSB)
- Other political affiliations: MDB (1985–1993); PDT (former)
- Education: Fundação de Ensino Superior de Pernambuco
- Profession: Politician, Physician, Cardiologist

Vicente André Gomes (18 January 1952 – 8 May 2020) was a Brazilian politician and physician with a specialization in cardiology from the state of Pernambuco.

== Life ==
The son of Geanny and Moacyr André Gomes, Gomes went to medical school at the Fundação de Ensino Superior de Pernambuco, graduated in 1978 and later finished his specialization in Cardiology at the Federal University of Pernambuco.

During his medical career, Gomes worked at various well known hospitals in Recife, such as Santa Casa de Misericórdia do Recife and Hospital dos Servidores do Estado de Pernambuco from 1979 to 1981.

In 1985, Gomes decided to pursue a career into politics and at the same year he was elected as one of the members of the Municipal Chamber of Recife, remaining a city councilman until 1995.

At a national level, Gomes represented Pernambuco at the Chamber of Deputies from 1995 to 1999.

After his tenure at the Chamber of Deputies, Gomes tried unsuccessfully to run at 2002 Brazilian municipal elections, but failed to win the mayoral elections of his native city Recife.

In 2004, Gomes was once again elected city councilman of Recife, this time remaining from 2005 to 2016 at the Municipal Chamber of Recife.

He was elected by his peers as President of the Municipal Chamber of Recife in 2013. He remained in power from 2013 to 2016.

== Death ==
On 8 May 2020, Gomes died at the age of 68 after almost 3 weeks of hospitalization due to complications brought on by COVID-19 during the COVID-19 pandemic in Brazil.
