= List of Brazilian state governors =

These are lists of Brazilian state governors.

- List of current state governors in Brazil
- List of female state governors in Brazil
- List of governors of Acre
- List of governors of Amapá
- List of governors of Amazonas
- List of governors of Bahia
- List of governors of Espírito Santo
- List of governors of the Federal District (Brazil)
- List of governors of Maranhão
- List of governors of Mato Grosso do Sul
- List of governors of Minas Gerais
- List of governors of Paraná
- List of governors of Rio de Janeiro
- List of governors of Rondônia
- List of governors of Roraima
- List of governors of São Paulo
- List of governors of Tocantins
