= List of Brazilian films of 1947 =

A list of films produced in Brazil in 1947:

Title	Director	Cast	Genre	Notes
Asas do Brasil	Moacyr Fenelon	Celso Guimarães, Mary Gonçalves, Paulo Porto	Adventure	
Este Mundo É um Pandeiro	Watson Macedo	Oscarito, Humberto Catalano, Olga Latour	Musical comedy	
Luz dos Meus Olhos	José Carlos Burle	Cacilda Becker, Celso Guimarães, Grande Otelo	Drama	
Não Me Digas Adeus	Luis Moglia Barth	Linda Batista, Lourdinha Bittencourt, Luiz Bonfá	Romance	
O Homem Que Chutou a Consciência	Ruy Costa	Aimée, Delorges Caminha, Duarte de Moraes	Drama	
O Malandro e a grã-fina	Luiz de Barros	Alvarenga, Túlio Berti, Apolo Correia	Musical comedy	
Querida Susana	Alberto Pieralisi	Anselmo Duarte, Tônia Carrero, Silvino Neto	Romantic comedy	
Sempre Resta Uma Esperança	Nélson Schultz	Rodolfo Arena, Maria Fernanda, Fregolente	Drama	
Uma Aventura aos Quarenta	Silveira Sampaio	Aída Carmen, Flávio Cordeiro, Ana Lúcia	Comedy	

== See also ==
- 1982 in Brazil
