= Florindo Corral =

Brazilian businessman (1949–2020)

Florindo Corral (Neves Paulista, 7 November 1949 – São Paulo, 4 April 2020) was a Brazilian businessman, founder of the University of Americana (FAM).

After a trip to Uruguay, he was diagnosed with COVID-19, of which he died at the age of 70 from complications on April 4, 2020, after being admitted to the private hospital in São Paulo for two weeks. He died as result of severe respiratory failure, caused by the disease.

He left his wife, two daughters, his son-in-law (businessman Gustavo Azzolini) and three granddaughters.
