= Naomi Munakata =

Brazilian conductor (1955–2020)

- 宗像 直美
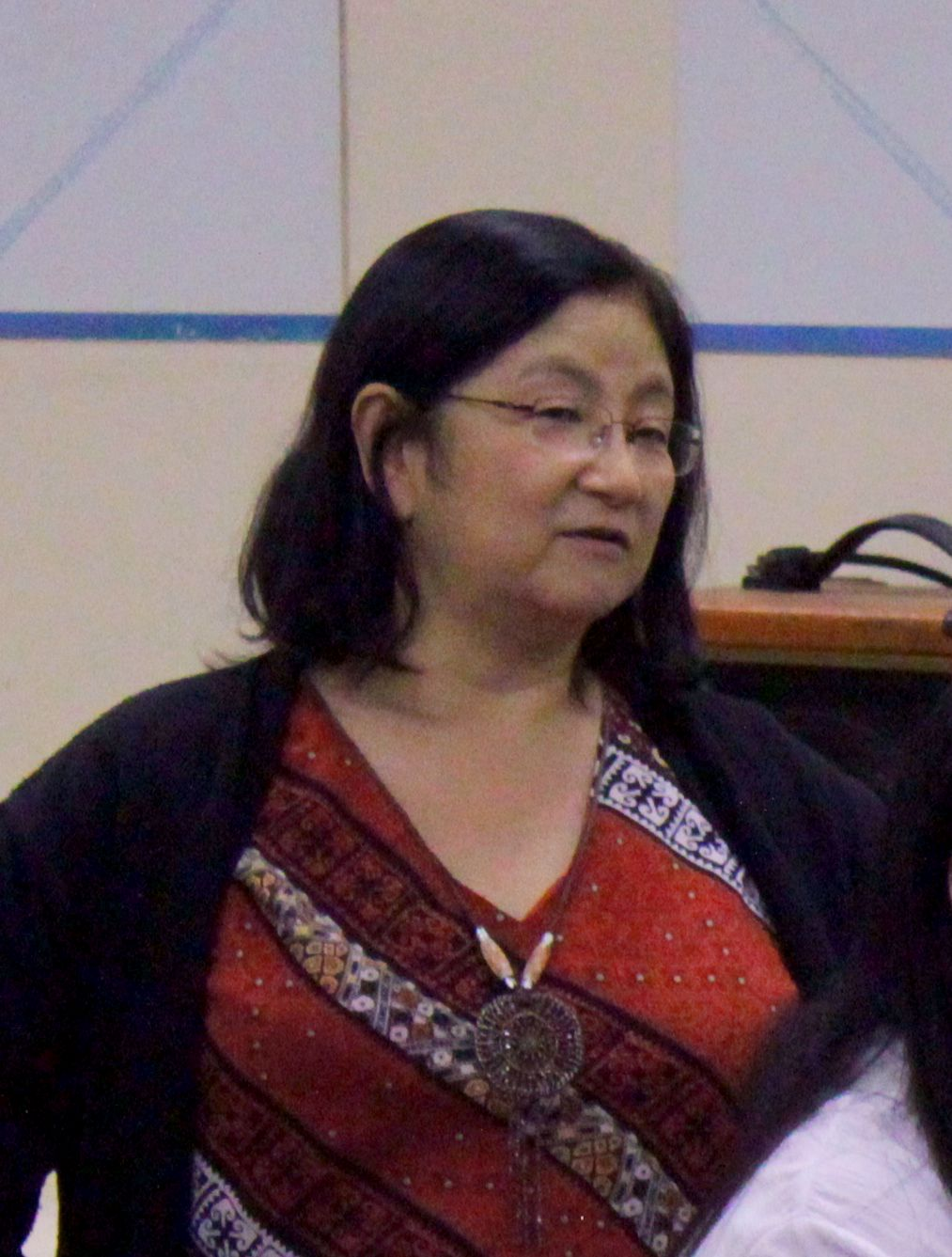
- Naomi Munakata (2011)
- Born: 31 May 1955; Hiroshima, Japan
- Died: 26 March 2020 (aged 64); São Paulo, Brazil
- Occupations: Choral conductor; Academic teacher
- Organizations: Choir of the Orquestra Sinfônica do Estado de São Paulo; Coral Paulistano Mário de Andrade

Japanese name
- Kanji: 宗像直美
- Hiragana: むなかた なおみ
Transcriptions
- Romanization: Munakata Naomi
- Kunrei-shiki: Munakata Naomi
- Nihon-shiki: Munakata Naomi

Naomi Munakata (宗像 直美, Munakata Naomi, 31 May 1955 – 26 March 2020) was a Japanese-born Brazilian choral conductor and academic teacher based in the city of São Paulo. She was conductor of Coro da OSESP, the choir of the Orquestra Sinfônica do Estado de São Paulo, from 1995 to 2013, and then principal conductor of Coral Paulistano Mário de Andrade at the Municipal Theatre. She was among the choral conductors in South America who "have contributed to the strengthening and stimulation of choral music", according to The Cambridge Companion to Choral Music.

== Life ==
Munakata was born on 31 May 1955 in Hiroshima, and the family moved to São Paulo, Brazil, when she was age two. She received piano lessons from age four and began singing in a choir that her father conducted at age seven. She also learned to play violin and harp. She studied at the Instituto Musical de São Paulo, graduating in composition and conducting in 1978. She studied conducting, musical analysis and counterpoint with Hans-Joachim Koellreutter. She also studied with Eleazar de Carvalho, Hugh Ross, Sérgio Magnani and John Neschling. She further studied with Eric Ericson in Sweden on a scholarship from Vitae Foundation, and was awarded a scholarship for studies of conducting at the University of Tokyo from the Japanese government in 1986. She received the award for best choral conductor from the São Paulo Association of Art Critics.

Munakata was teacher and director of the Escola Municipal de Música de São Paulo, and conductor and artistic director of the Coral Jovem do Estado, the state youth choir. She ran a regular radio program, "Vozes" (Voices) on Rádio Cultura FM in São Paulo, informing about choral music.

She was conductor of Coro da OSESP, the choir of the Orquestra Sinfônica do Estado de São Paulo, from 1995 to 2013, when she became the choir's Honorary Conductor. From 2014, she was artistic director of the Coral Paulistano Mário de Andrade, the chorus of the Theatro Municipal. She taught at the faculties Faculdade Santa Marcelina and Faculdade de Artes Alcântara Machado (FAAM).

In the COVID-19 pandemic in Brazil, Munakata was hospitalized on 16 March 2020 at the Hospital Alemão Oswaldo Cruz with symptoms of the infection and died on 26 March at the age of 64.

== Awards ==
She received the award for best choral conductor from the São Paulo Association of Art Critics.
