= Augusto Montenegro =

Brazilian lawyer and politician, former governor of the state of Pará

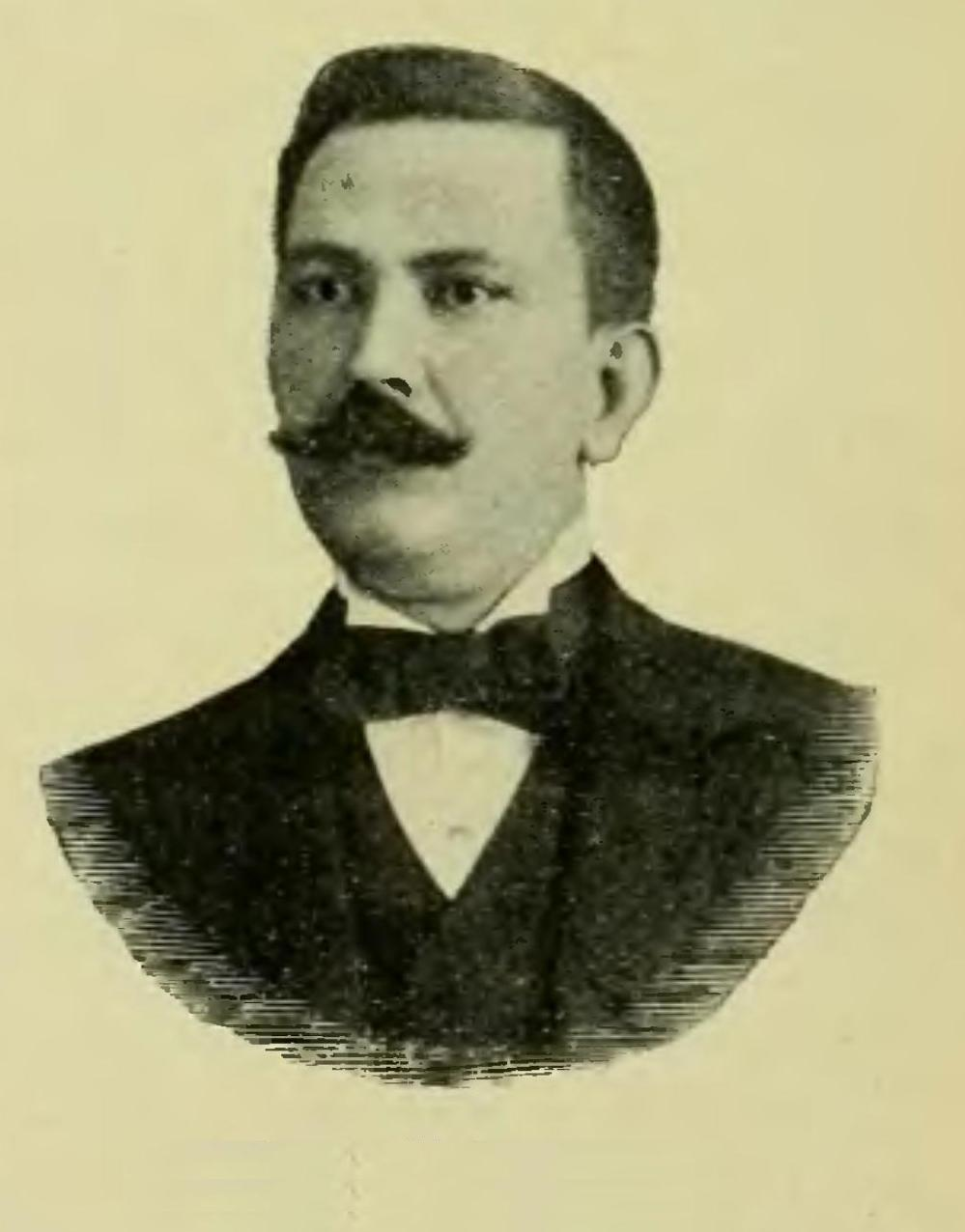

Governor of Pará
- In office 1 February 1901 – 1 February 1909

Personal details
- Born: José Abílio Silva de Santana; 26 June 1867; Belém, Pará, Brazil
- Died: 31 July 1915 (aged 48); Switzerland
- Occupation: Politician, lawyer

Augusto Montenegro (26 June 1867 - 31 July 1915) was a Brazilian politician and lawyer, who served as Governor of Pará, from February 1, 1901, to February 1, 1909.

== Time in office ==
He completed the Belém-Bragança Railway on December 31, 1901, regularized the finances, improved the water service, and resolved the centuries-old dispute over the lands of Amapá, winning over the French. Augusto Montenegro replaced governor Paes de Carvalho.

The governor abolished the Conservatório de Música Instituto Carlos Gomes, by decree, dismissing the director and all teachers, in 1908, saying he had to cut expenses. The Conservatory had been in operation since 1895 (about 13 years).

== Legacy ==
In his honor, Augusto Montenegro was the name given to the highway that, from Av. Almirante Barroso, at the junction, in Belém, leads to the district of Icoaraci, due to the expansion of the municipality, being one of its busiest roads.
