= 1947 in Brazilian football =

Football in Brazil
- Season: 1947

The 46th season of competitive football in Brazil was played in 1947.

== Campeonato Paulista ==
Final Standings

Position	Team	Points	Played	Won	Drawn	Lost	For	Against	Difference
1	Palmeiras	36	20	17	2	1	51	16	35
2	Corinthians	32	20	14	4	2	54	19	35
3	Portuguesa	27	20	11	5	4	43	28	15
4	São Paulo	25	20	8	9	3	48	27	21
5	Ypiranga-SP	21	20	9	3	8	36	26	10
6	Santos	19	20	6	7	7	33	27	6
7	Juventus	16	20	5	6	9	29	45	-16
8	Portuguesa Santista	15	20	6	3	11	27	42	-15
9	Comercial-SP	11	20	5	1	14	25	59	-34
10	Nacional-SP	10	20	3	4	13	25	47	-22
11	Jabaquara	8	20	2	4	14	22	57	-35

Palmeiras declared as the Campeonato Paulista champions.

== State championship champions ==
State	Champion	State	Champion
Acre	Rio Branco-AC	Paraíba	Botafogo-PB
Alagoas	Alexandria	Paraná	Coritiba
Amapá	Macapá	Pernambuco	Santa Cruz
Amazonas	Olímpico-AM	Piauí	Flamengo-PI
Bahia	Bahia	Rio de Janeiro	Americano
Ceará	Fortaleza	Rio de Janeiro (DF)	Vasco
Espírito Santo	Rio Branco-ES	Rio Grande do Norte	ABC
Goiás	Atlético Goianiense	Rio Grande do Sul	Internacional
Maranhão	Moto Club	Rondônia	Ferroviário-RO
Mato Grosso	Mixto	Santa Catarina	América-SC
Minas Gerais	Atlético Mineiro	São Paulo	Palmeiras
Pará	Paysandu	Sergipe	Olímpico-SE

== Brazil national team ==
The following table lists all the games played by the Brazil national football team in official competitions and friendly matches during 1947.

Date	Opposition	Result	Score	Brazil scorers	Competition
March 29, 1947	Uruguay	D	0-0	-	Copa Rio Branco
April 1, 1947	Uruguay	W	3-2	Tesourinha, Heleno de Freitas, Jair da Rosa Pinto	Copa Rio Branco
