= Federal University of Pará =

Public university in Brazil

Coordinates: 1.4762°S 48.4577°W

- Universidade Federal do Pará
- Other names: UFPA
- Type: Public university
- Established: July 2, 1957
- Budget: US$ Approx. 360 million (2024)
- Rector: Gilmar Pereira da Silva
- Academic staff: 2,997
- Administrative staff: 2,458
- Students: 50,374
- Location: Belém (main campus), Abaetetuba, Altamira, Ananindeua, Bragança, Castanhal, Cametá, Capanema, Breves, Tucuruí, and Soure, Pará, Brazil
- Website: Portal UFPA

The Federal University of Pará (Portuguese: Universidade Federal do Pará, UFPA) is one of the public universities maintained by the Brazilian federal government in the state of Pará. The university, with + 50,000 students enrolled in its courses, operates across multiple campuses in the cities of Belém, Abaetetuba, Altamira, Ananindeua, Bragança, Castanhal, Cametá, Capanema, Breves, Tucuruí and Soure. Among UFPA research teams, there are many nationally recognized groups, particularly in the fields of genetics, parasitology, tropical diseases and geosciences.

== Structure ==
The Federal University of Pará is the largest institution in both the North region of Brazil and the entire Amazon by enrollment and is a reference in the areas of Biomedical Sciences and Biology research, this last one mainly because of the Amazon rainforest. Also, it is widely regarded as the best university in the northern region of Brazil and throughout the Amazon biome.

It was founded in 1957, as a non-profit public higher education institution located in the large city of Belém, Pará. The university is officially accredited/recognised by the Brazilian Ministry of Education as a prominent, coeducational higher education institution.

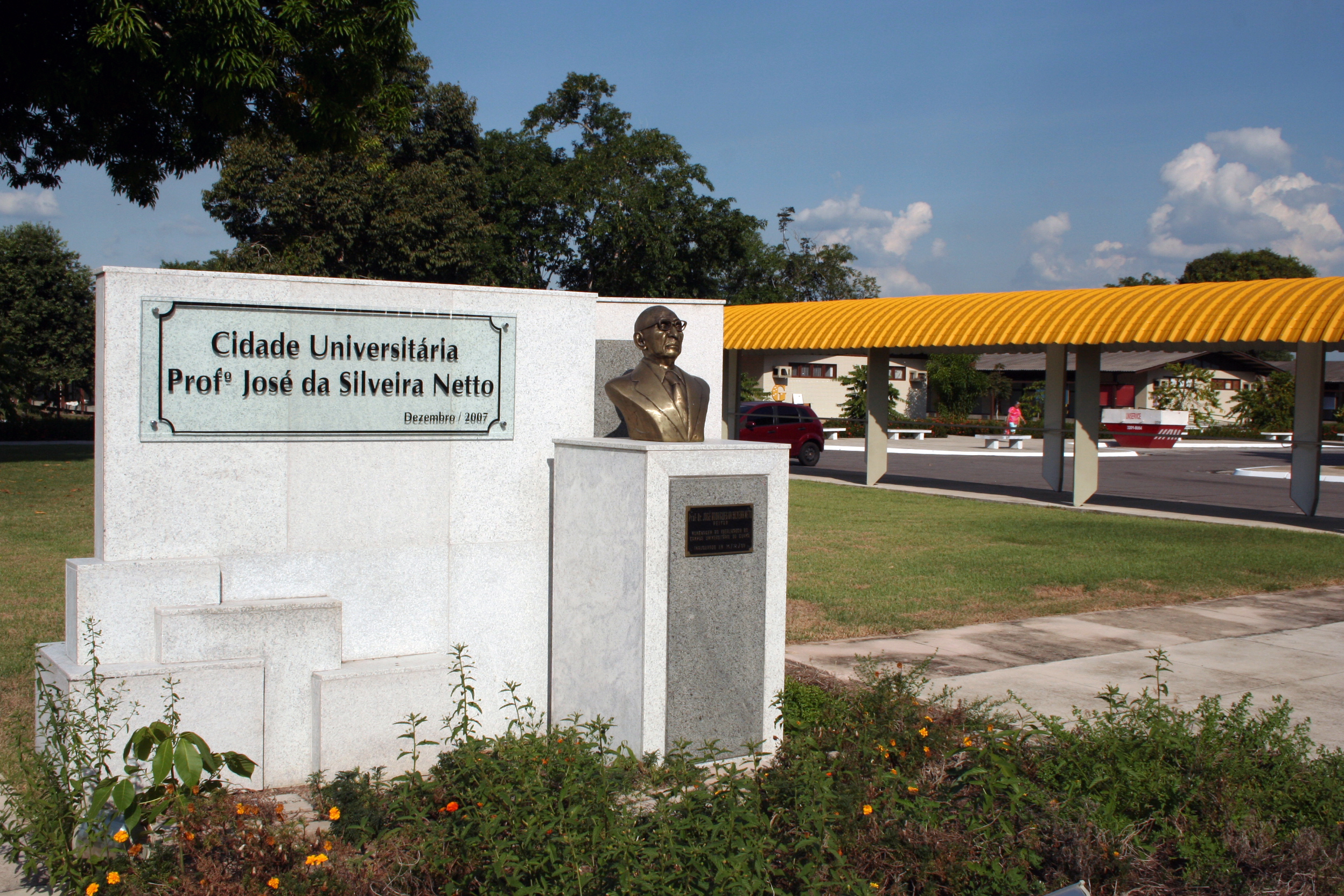
University City Prof. José da Silveira Netto. Belém Campus.

Some of its faculties, such as the Law School (founded in 1902), the Pharmacy School (founded in 1903), and the Medical School (founded in 1919), being among the oldest in Brazil and being absorbed by it.

Its territorial area is approximately 3,328,655.80 m², while its built-up area is approximately 204,930.90 m². The fundamental principle of UFPA is the integration of teaching, research, and extension functions. It was listed 15th in the ranking of the largest institutions in the country in terms of enrollments.

UFPA is a Federal Institution of higher education with didactic, scientific, disciplinary, administrative, financial and property management autonomy. It is a multiple-Campus university with operations in the state of Pará. Featuring 154 undergraduate courses, 35 specialization courses, 100 master's programs, 55 doctoral programs, 25 institutes and centers, reaching 82 municipalities, 3 schools, 3 university hospitals, 28 medical residencies, 12 campuses, 1,021 research groups, 622 extension programs and projects, 2,458 technicians, 50,374 students, and 2,997 professors, it establishes itself as a center of excellence, where teaching, research, and extension converge to promote comprehensive education and contribute to the sustainable development of the region and the country as a whole.

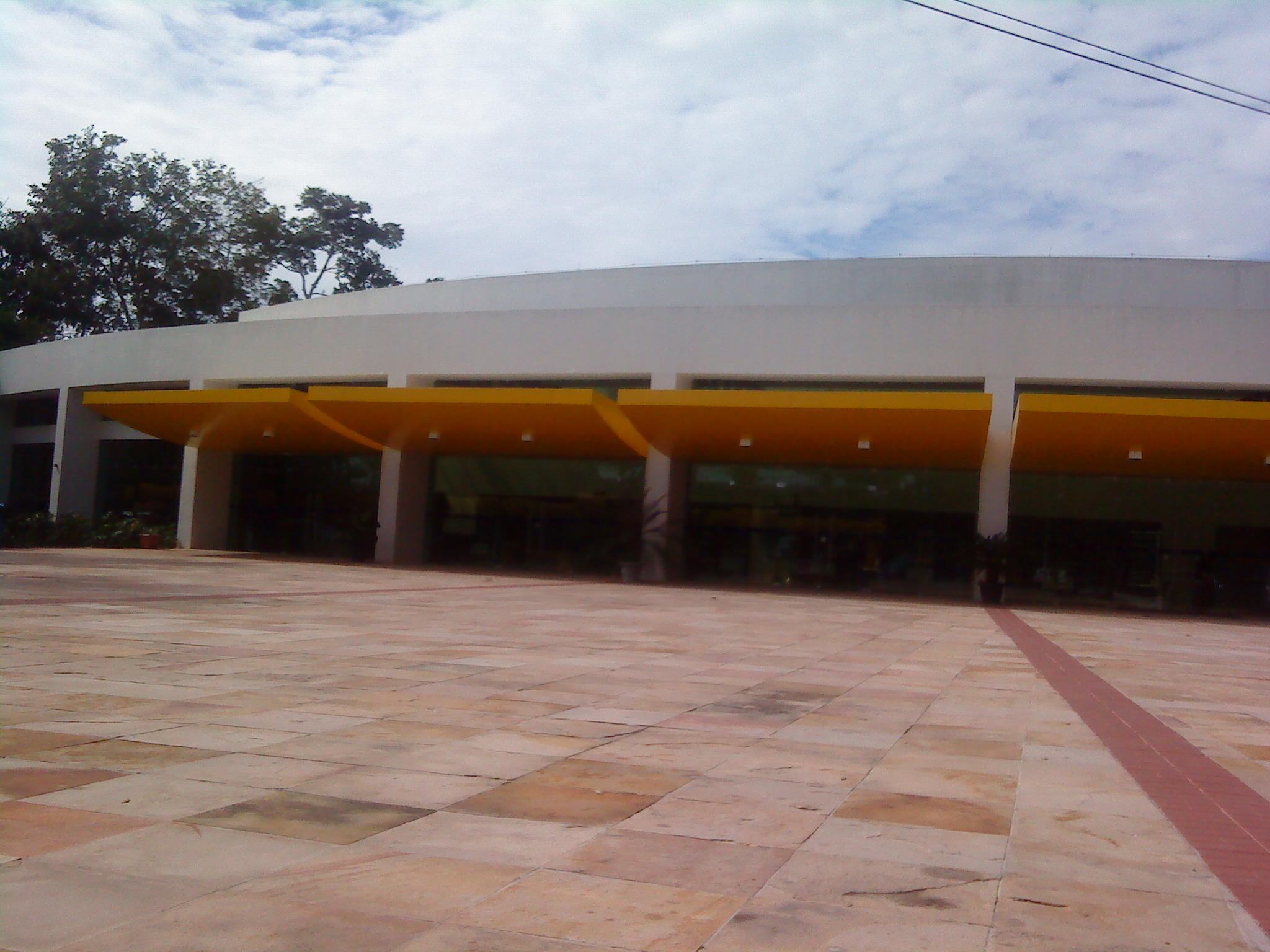
Convention Center.

The university offers bachelor's degrees in the fields of arts and humanities, business and social sciences, language and culture, medicine and health, engineering and science and technology. Postgraduate degrees (master's and doctorate) are offered in all of the above-mentioned areas, except medicine and health and language and culture (doctorate degree).

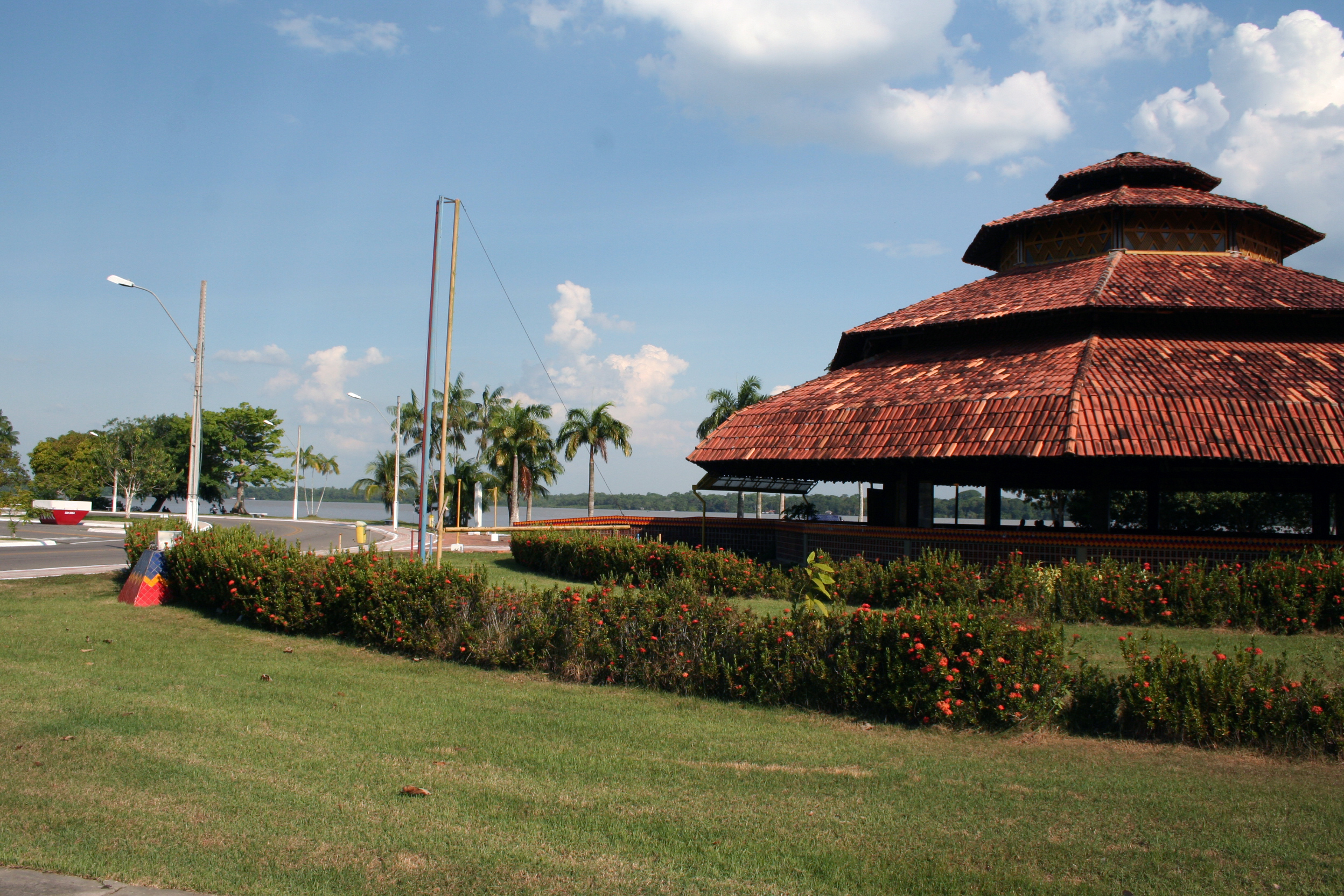
University restaurant.

Among UFPA research teams, there are many nationally recognised groups, particularly in the fields of parasitology, tropical diseases and geosciences. UFPA is a reference in the areas of biomedical sciences and biology research, the latter due to the city's location as a gateway to the Amazon river and house to the Amazon rainforest.

== The Main Campus ==
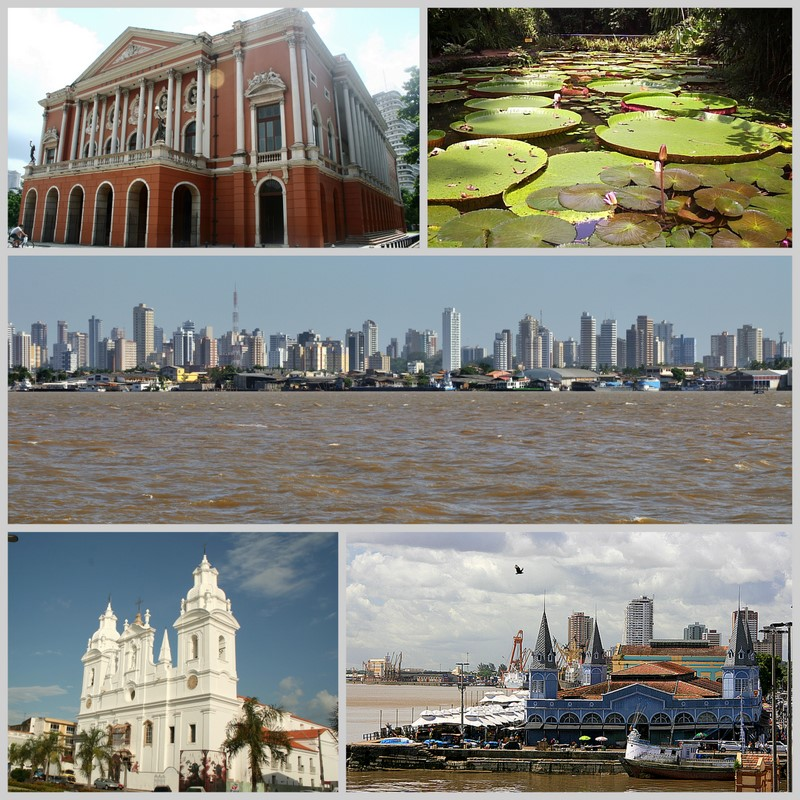
Belém, the capital of the state of Pará. It is the city where the central campus of UFPA is located.

The university main campus is located in the Pará's capital city, Belém, a city with a tropical climate. It is very humid and moist, with no dry season. This gives the tropical rainforest vegetation the ideal amount of moisture in which to thrive. The Amazon is home to an astounding variety of species; both plant and animal. This area is known for being home to portions of the Amazon River and its jungle, as well as for its abundant rubber and timber plantations. Some of the most popular attractions include Estacao das Docas (Station of the Docks), Teatro da Paz (Peace Theatre) – dating back as far as 1869 and taking one of the many river tours that are conducted on a regular basis. One can also drop by the Mercado Ver-o-Peso, the largest free fair in South America, as well as the Mangrove of Herons Garden, a contemporary-styled park in the Cidade Velha area of Belém.

== History ==
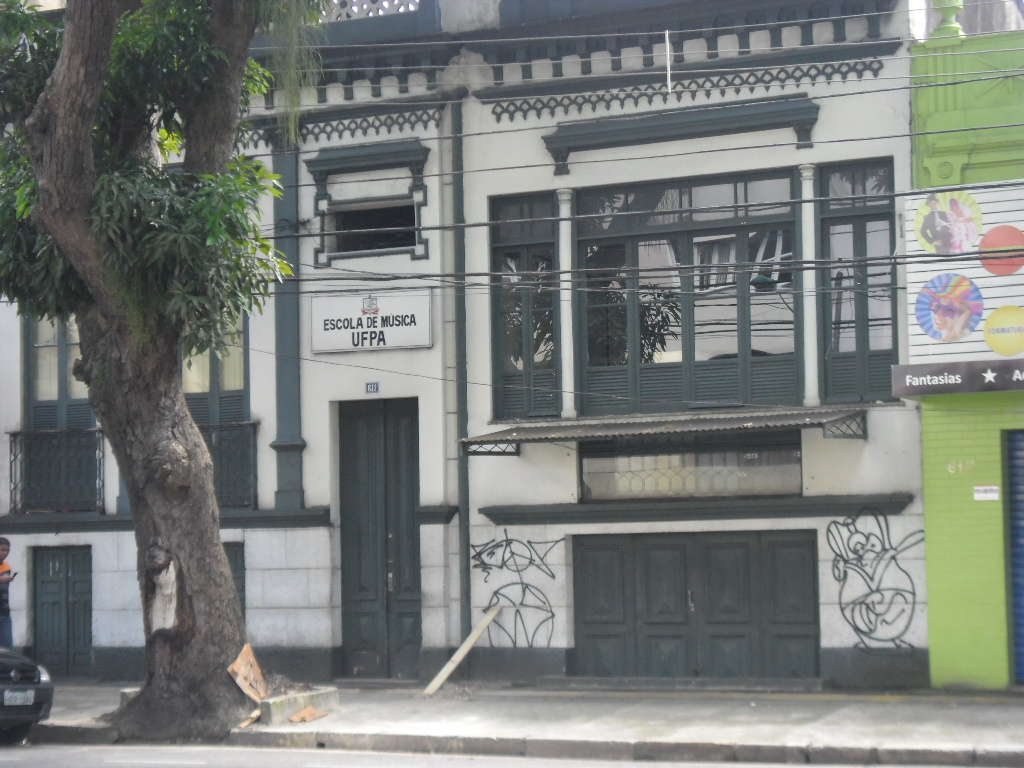
School of Music of UFPA, in 2012

The current administrative model of UFPA emerged from the need to centralize a higher education institution for the eastern Amazon, as there were previously some colleges in the city of Belém, organized as free colleges. The oldest of these is the Law School, established on March 31, 1902, followed by the establishment of the School of Pharmacy of Pará in 1903, the Free School of Dentistry in 1914, the Faculty of Medicine and Surgery of Pará on January 9, 1919, the School of Engineering of Pará in 1931, the Faculty of Economic, Accounting and Actuarial Sciences in 1953, and the Faculty of Philosophy, Sciences, and Letters of Belém in 1954. These educational institutions were the forerunners of UFPA.

=== Establishment ===
The University of Pará was officially created on July 2, 1957, by decree no. 3,191, sanctioned by the then president Juscelino Kubitschek, after five years of legislative process. It brought together the seven federal, state, and private colleges existing in Belém: Law, Pharmacy, Dentistry, Medicine and Surgery, Civil Engineering, Economic, Accounting and Actuarial Sciences, and Philosophy, Sciences, and Letters.

More than 18 months after its creation, the University of Pará was solemnly installed in a session chaired by President Kubitschek at the Teatro da Paz, on January 31, 1959. Its installation was a merely symbolic act, as Decree no. 42,427 had already approved, on October 12, 1957, the first statute of the university, which defined the orientation of the institution's educational policy, and since November 28 of the same year, the first rector, Mário Braga Henriques (Nov. 1957 to Dec. 1960), was in office.

On December 19, 1960, José Rodrigues da Silveira Netto took office, holding the rectorate for eight and a half years (Dec. 1960 to July 1969).

The first statutory reform of the university took place in September 1963, when the new statute was published in the Official Gazette. Two months after the statutory reform, the university was restructured by Law no. 4,283, of November 18, 1963. During this period, new courses and new basic activities were implemented, with the aim of promoting regional development and also improving the institution's core activities.

=== UFPA during the dictatorial period ===
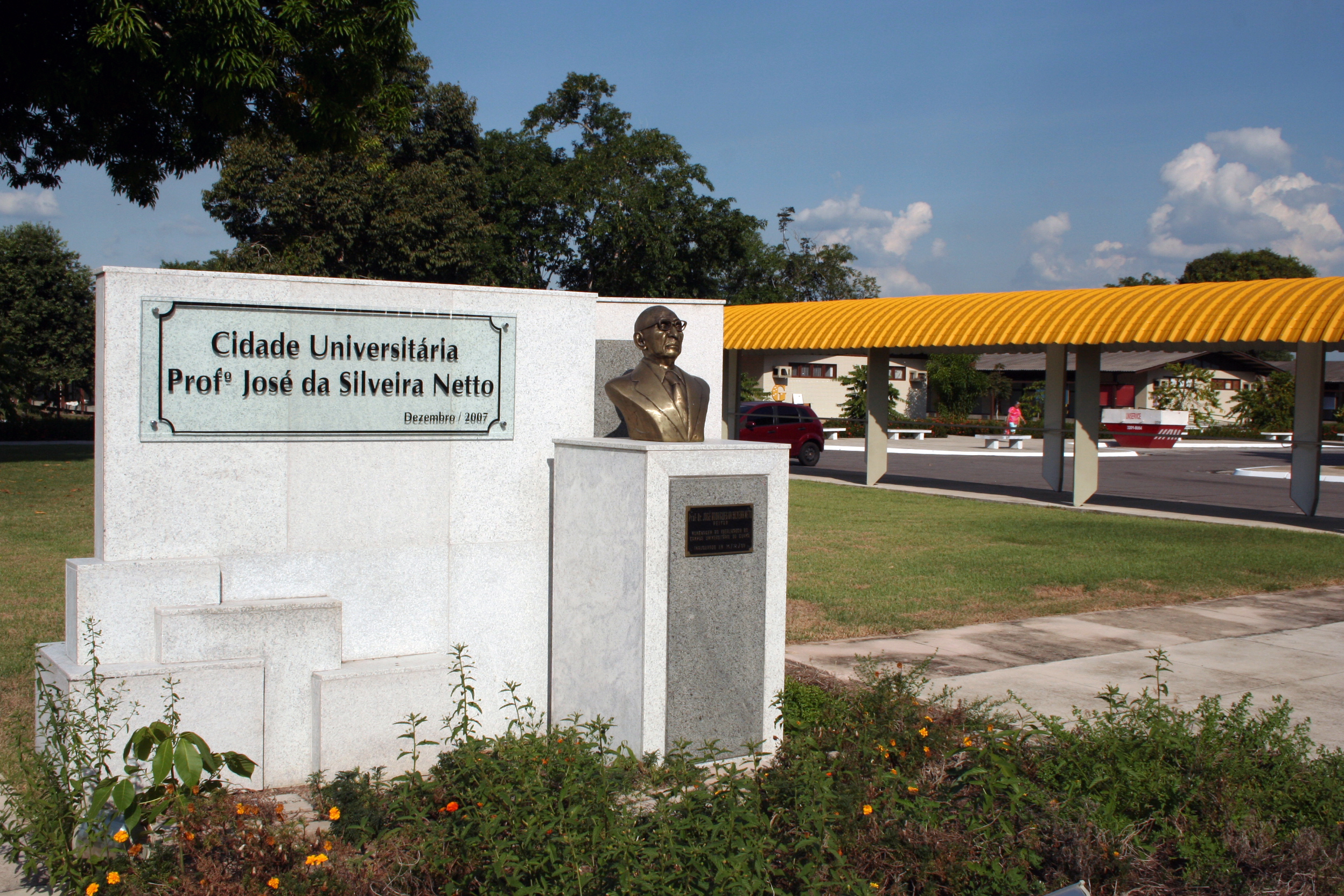
Prof. José da Silveira Netto University City, Belém Campus, in 2008

A new restructuring of the university was attempted in 1968, with a plan presented to the Federal Council of Education. From late 1968 to early 1969, a series of legal diplomas, notably Laws no. 5,539 and 5,540/68, established new criteria for the operation of Universities.

From July 1969 to June 1973, Aloysio Chaves served as the rector, during which Decree No. 65,880, dated December 16, 1969, approved the new restructuring plan of the Federal University of Pará. One of the essential elements of this plan was the creation of centers, with the extinction of existing faculties, and the definition of the departments' functions.

On September 2, 1970, the Federal Council of Education approved the General Regulations of the Federal University of Pará through Ordinance No. 1,307/70. A regimental revision was carried out in 1976/1977, aiming to comply with subsequent legal provisions, which led to a new regulation approved by the Federal Council of Education through Opinion No. 1,854/77 and published in the Official Gazette on July 18, 1978.

Clóvis Cunha da Gama Malcher took office in July 1973 (Jul. 1973 to Jun. 1977), followed by Aracy Amazonas Barretto (Jul. 1977 to Jun. 1981) and Daniel Coelho de Souza (Jul. 1981 to Jun. 1985).

=== UFPA during the democratic period ===
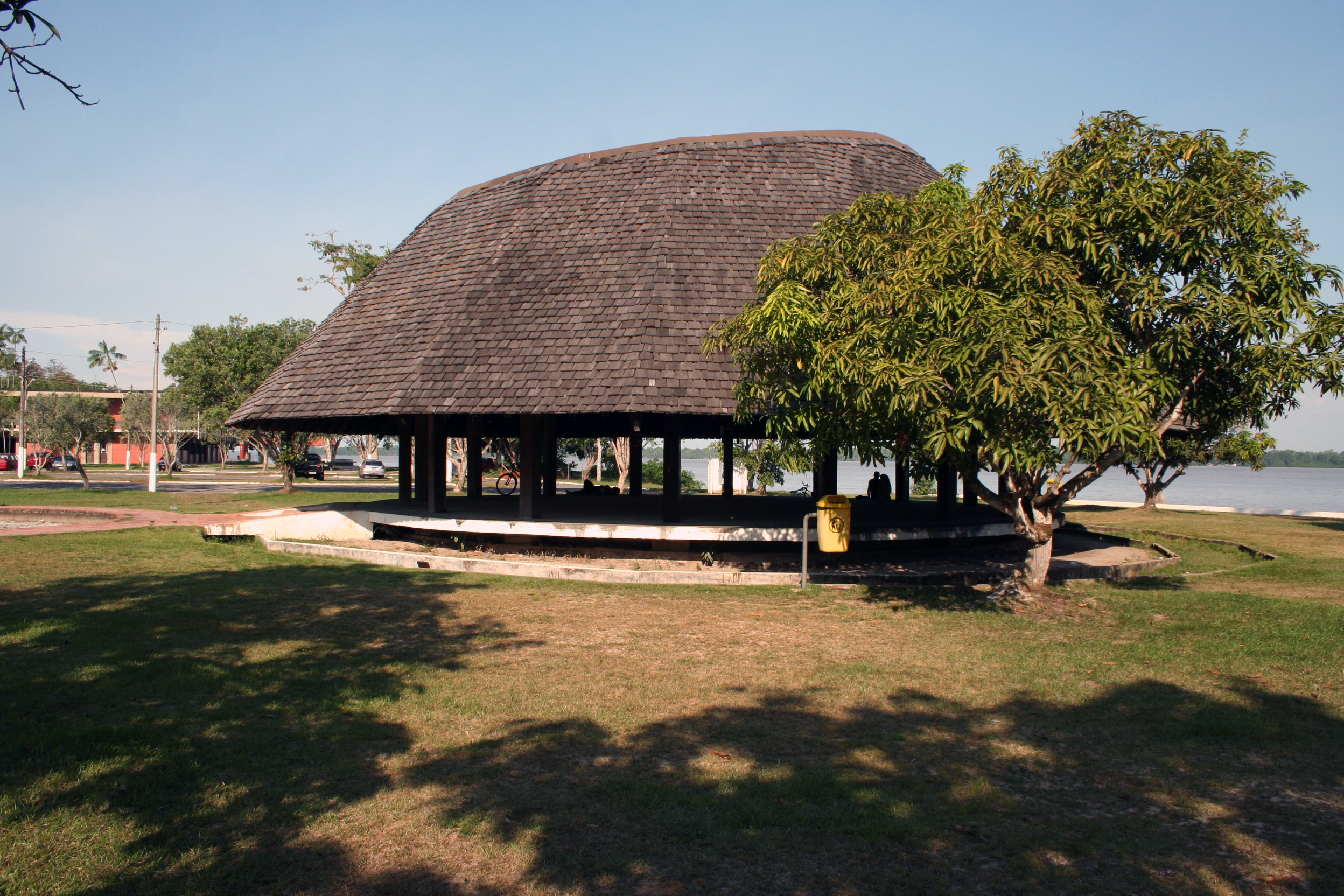
University Chapel of Belém Campus, in 2008

In the year 1985, the Rectorate's regulations were reformulated after the approval of Resolution No. 549 by the University Council on December 9, 1985, and have been in effect to the present date.

José Seixas Lourenço held the rectorship from July 1985 to June 1989, followed by Nilson Pinto de Oliveira from July 1989 to June 1993, Marcos Ximenes Ponte from July 1993 to June 1997, and Cristovam Wanderley Picanço Diniz from July 1997 to June 2001.

== Subdivisions ==
The following units are part of the university complex:

- Institutes: 15. Art Sciences; Biological Sciences; Education Sciences; Exact and Natural Sciences; Legal Sciences; Health Sciences; Applied Social Sciences; Philosophy and Humanities; Geosciences; Modern Languages; Technology; Mathematics and Science Education; Coastal Estuaries; Veterinary Medicine; Small Rural Properties.
- Study and Research Centers: 9. Higher Amazonian Studies; Amazon Development in Engineering; Aquatic Ecology and Fisheries in the Amazon; Transdisciplinary Studies in Basic Education; Tropical Medicine; Research in Oncology; Behavioral Theory and Research; Environmental; Agricultural Sciences and Rural Development.
- Campi: 12. Abaetetuba, Altamira, Ananindeua, Belém, Bragança, Breves, Cametá, Capanema, Castanhal, Salinópolis, Soure e Tucuruí.
- Education poles: 93
- School of Music: 1. UFPA School of Music (EMUFPA).
- Theater and Dance School: 1. UFPA Theater and Dance School (ETDUFPA).
- University Hospitals: 2. João de Barros Barreto University Hospital (HUJBB); Bettina Ferro de Souza University Hospital (HUBFS).
- Veterinary Hospital: 1. Veterinary Hospital of the Federal University of Pará (HV-UFPA).

== Rectors ==
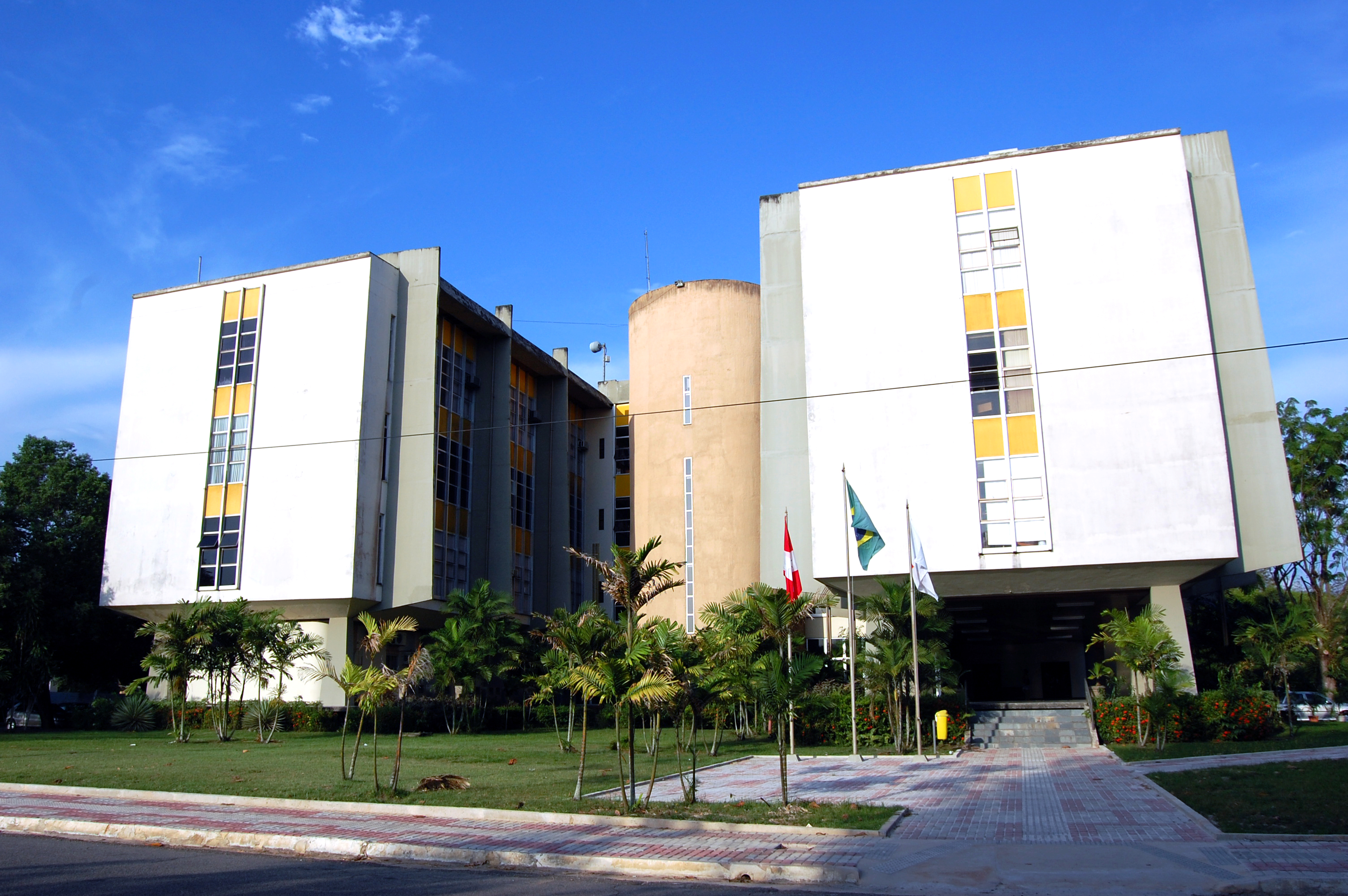
Rectory buildings, in 2008

The first rector of the Federal University of Pará was Professor Mário Braga Henriques, from the Law School, and the one who remained for the shortest period, only three years, in the rectory.

Professor Coelho de Souza (1981-1985) was the last rector of the Military Regime, and Professor José Seixas Lourenço (1985-1989) was the first elected by the academic community, at the beginning of the country's redemocratization.

=== List of rectors ===
Rector		Term	Reference
1	Mário Braga Henriques	1957 - 1960	
2	José Rodrigues da Silveira Netto	1960 - 1969	
3	Aloysio da Costa Chaves	1969 - 1973	
4	Clóvis Cunha da Gama Malcher	1973 - 1977	
5	Aracy Amazonas Barretto	1977 - 1981	
6	Daniel Queima Coelho de Souza	1981 - 1985	
7	José Seixas Lourenço	1985 - 1989	
8	Nilson Pinto de Oliveira	1989 - 1993	
9	Marcos Ximenes Ponte	1993 - 1997	
10	Cristovam Wanderley Picanço Diniz	1997 - 2001	
11	Alex Bolonha Fiúza de Mello	2001 - 2009	
12	Carlos Edilson Maneschy	2009 - 2016	
13	Emmanuel Zagury Tourinho	2016 - 2020	
14	Gilmar Pereira da Silva (interim)	2020 - 2020	
15	Tadeu Oliver Gonçalves (interim)	2020 - 2020	
16	Emmanuel Zagury Tourinho	2020 - 2024	
17	Gilmar Pereira da Silva	2024 - present	

== Rankings ==
UFPA positions in the university rankings.
Institution	Ranking Amazon	Ranking Brazil	Ranking Latin America	Ranking World	Source
THE Times Higher	1	33	59	1501	
RUF Folha de São Paulo	1	31	-	-	
Webometrics	1	21	36	998	
CWRU	1	29	49	1254	
QS Quacquarelli Symonds	1	33	118	1401	
SCImago Institutions Rankings (SIR)	1	29	56	-	

== Museum of the Federal University of Pará ==
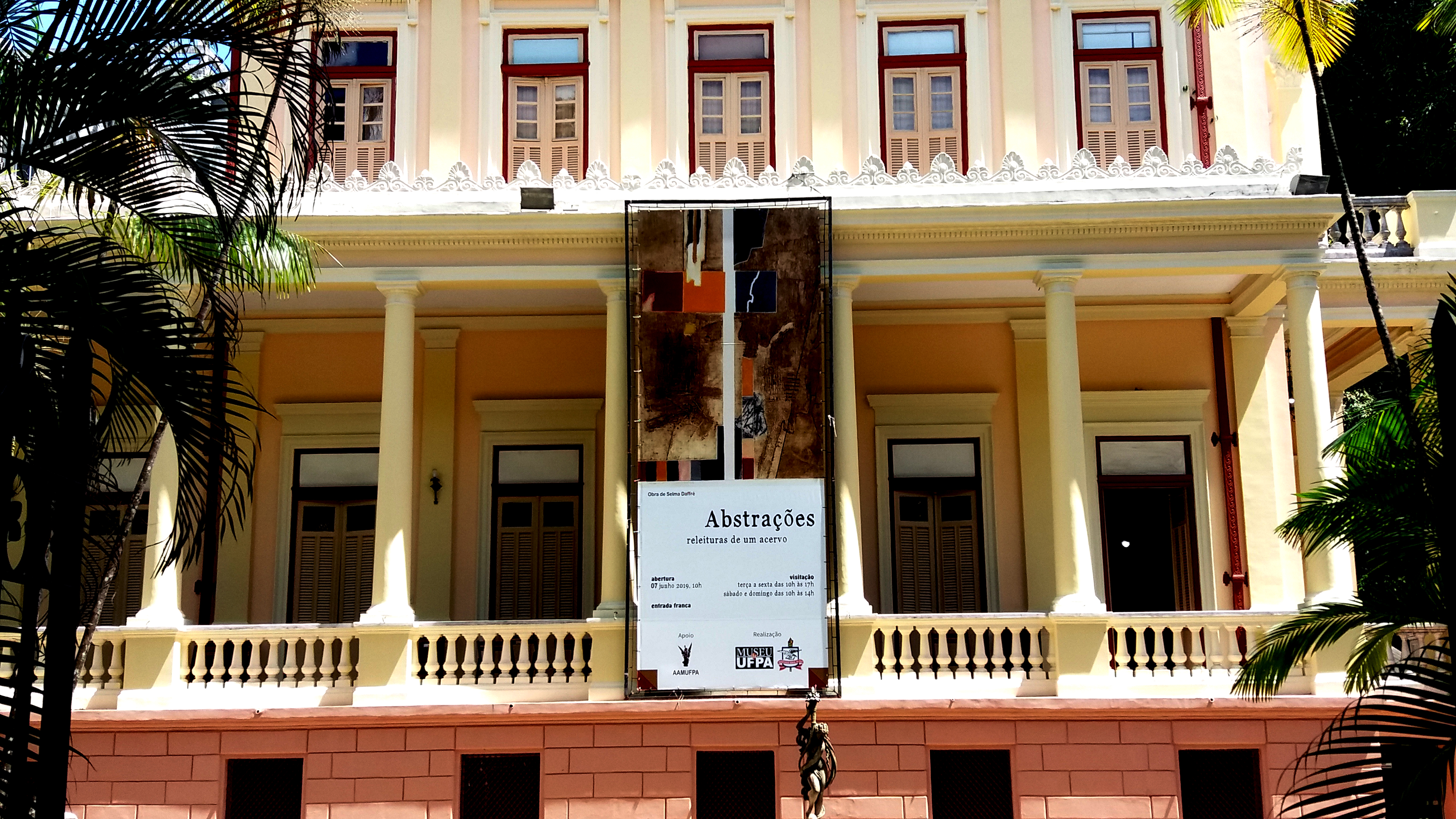
UFPA Museum.

The Museum of the Federal University of Pará (MUFPA) was established in 1983 to house collections of the university from both Brazil and its North Region. It is located in the Augusto Montenegro Mansion, the former residence of Governor Augusto Montenegro.

== Notable alumni ==
— Jean Hébette : Professor Hébbete was an economist and one of the greatest references in research involving Amazon's social conditions.

— Luiz Carlos de Lima Silveira : Luiz Silveira was a pioneer in the development of Neuroscience at UFPa. He is a respected neuroscientist in Brazil and had a Ph.D. in Neurophysiology from Oxford University.

— Maria Paula Cruz Schneider : One of the greatest Brazilian's geneticist. Dr. Schneider was a student of the first Biology major of the university. Her research focus mainly in Polymorphism (biology).

== See also ==
- Federal Institute of Pará
- Federal Rural University of Amazonia
- List of federal universities of Brazil
- Pará State University
- Universities and Higher Education in Brazil
