= Asthma phenotyping and endotyping =

Medical classification of asthma

Asthma phenotyping and endotyping is a novel approach to asthma classification inspired by precision medicine. It seeks to separate the clinical presentations or clusters of signs and symptoms of asthma, known as asthma phenotypes, from their underlying etiologies or causes, known as asthma endotypes.

Asthma endotyping is useful in predicting which patients will benefit from inhaled corticosteroids or targeted therapy using specific biologics, while phenotyping can help predict disease outcomes. Numerous asthma phenotypes and endotypes have been proposed, though not all have been validated or widely accepted.

== Asthma endotypes ==
Asthma is now recognised as a heterogenous condition by the Global Initiative for Asthma (GINA), and as an umbrella term encompassing multiple different diseases by many scientists. This is because multiple different pathological processes amenable to different therapies and with different long-term prognoses and complications are at play in asthma.

== Asthma phenotypes ==
Asthma phenotypes are not fixed; a person's inflammatory phenotype may change over the course of a single day. Thus, basing asthma treatment plans on a single sputum eosinophil measurement may be misleading. It is not known to what extent asthma phenotypes can change in the long term.

GINA presently recognises five asthma phenotypes: allergic asthma, non-allergic asthma, adult-onset asthma, asthma with persistent airflow limitation, and asthma with obesity.

== Type 2 inflammation-based endotyping ==
GINA currently recognises two asthma endotypes based on the degree of type 2 inflammation in the airways: type 2-high (T2-high) and type 2-low (T2-low) asthma.

=== Type 2-high asthma ===
GINA defines T2-high asthma as the presence of one or more of the following signs in a patient taking high-dose inhaled corticosteroids:

- blood eosinophils ≥ 150 per μL
- fractional exhaled nitric oxide (FeNO) ≥ 20 ppb
- sputum eosinophils ≥ 2%
- allergen-driven asthma

Type 2 inflammation is produced by eosinophils in the lungs in response to various alarmins, including interleukin (IL)-25, IL-33, and thymic stromal lymphopoietin (TSLP), which themselves are produced in response to triggers such as allergens, irritants, and respiratory infections.

T2-high asthma phenotypes range in severity from mild to severe. Severe type 2-high asthma is amenable to multiple targeted biologics, including anti-IL5R, anti-IL4, anti-IL13, and anti-TSLP antibodies.

==== Early-onset atopic asthma ====
Early-onset atopic asthma is the most common phenotype of asthma in childhood, called intrinsic asthma in the earlier intrinsic/extrinsic classification. Patients with early-onset atopic asthma frequently have a family history of atopy, and are sensitised to common allergens. This phenotype usually responds well to inhaled corticosteroids, and is only rarely severe, with most cases exhibiting mild disease.

Atopy, reduced lung function, and respiratory infections in infants with wheeze are risk factors for asthma persistence into adulthood, and a lower lung function and greater magnitude of atopy at this age is associated with more severe disease.

Severe atopic asthma is also additionally amenable to anti-immunoglubulin E (IgE) therapy. This type of targeted therapy reduces the concentration of IgEs, which normally bind to allergens and cause the release of mast cell mediators and alarmins, promoting type 2 airway inflammation and bronchoconstriction.

==== Late-onset eosinophilic asthma ====
Late-onset eosinophilic asthma, previously called extrinsic asthma, presents in adults with no diagnosed atopy. However, late-onset asthma may frequently be allergic. Many patients still have elevated IgE levels, may test positive against a broader panel of known allergens than is normally tested for in specific IgE testing and prick tests, and frequently have comorbid allergic rhinitis and atopic dermatitis.

This phenotype is frequently severe, resulting in relatively rapid lung function decline, and unresponsive to inhaled corticosteroids; good asthma control may not be achieved even with high doses, instead requiring biologic treatment.

===== Aspirin-exacerbated respiratory disease =====
It is estimated that around 5–15% of asthmatics experience bronchoconstriction after taking aspirin or other NSAIDs. Aspirin sensitivity frequently presents with a late onset of severe asthma, and chronic rhinosinusitis with nasal polyps. This syndrome is termed aspirin-exacerbated respiratory disease (AERD). AERD is considered to be a sub-phenotype of late-onset eosinophilic asthma.

A key distinguishing feature of AERD is a dysregulated arachidonic acid metabolism and prostaglandin E_{2} (and prostaglandin E_{2} receptor) deficiency, leading to excess production of bronchoconstricting leukotrienes, such as leukotriene D_{4}, and immune cell activation, together causing respiratory symptoms. Bronchospasm due to aspirin is thought to occur because aspirin's inhibition of cyclooxygenase shifts arachidonic acid metabolism even more towards bronchoconstrictive leukotriene synthesis.

==== Allergic bronchopulmonary aspergillosis ====
Allergic bronchopulmonary aspergillosis (ABPA) is a respiratory disease caused by a hypersensitivity reaction to Aspergillus fumigatus mold that has germinated and persists in the lower airways. While ABPA can also be frequently present in cystic fibrosis patients, most ABPA patients seem to be asthmatics. In asthmatics, ABPA may be regarded as a T2-high asthma phenotype.

Sensitisation to Aspergillus fumigatus may be present in up to 20% of asthmatic children, and it is considered a precursor to ABPA. ABPA itself is estimated to affect 12.9% of adult asthmatics.

==== Cough variant asthma ====
Cough variant asthma (CVA), asthma where the only symptom is cough responsive to bronchodilator therapy, may be a T2-high asthma phenotype. CVA may be a precursor stage of other T2-high asthma phenotypes, as 30% of CVA patients are estimated to develop the classical asthma phenotype of wheeze and dyspnea. However, long-term inhaled corticosteroid treatment can reduce the risk of CVA developing into asthma with wheeze and dyspnea.

This classification of CVA has thus far not been widely accepted. Also, recent evidence suggests that other inflammatory endotypes rather than just the T2-high endotype may be seen in CVA. Thus, the classification of CVA as T2-high asthma is uncertain.

=== Type 2-low asthma ===
T2-low asthma is rare compared to T2-high asthma, but is often severe and refractory to inhaled corticosteroids. There is a lack of targeted therapies to treat severe T2-low asthma, with the exception of anti-TSLP therapy, which is indicated for severe asthma regardless of etiology. Detectable type 1 airway inflammation may or may not be present in T2-low asthma. Sputum neutrophil counts may or may not be elevated.

==== Asthma with obesity ====
Asthma with obesity, insulin resistance, vitamin D deficiency, or metabolic syndrome is now recognised as a distinct T2-low phenotype of severe asthma refractory to inhaled corticosteroids. Obesity is a known risk factor for asthma development and exacerbation. Though a causal link has not been established, multiple reasons for this association have been proposed.

Firstly, obesity mechanically impairs lung function and promotes airway hyperresponsiveness, a hallmark of asthma. Gastroesophageal reflux disease (GERD) is a common comorbidity in both obesity and asthma and has been shown to reduce asthma control.

Adipose tissue releases pro-inflammatory mediators such as C-reactive protein (CRP), tumour necrosis factor (TNF)-α, transforming growth factor (TGF)-β, and IL-6. These mediators may contribute to type 1 inflammation in the lungs. Losing weight, such as via bariatric surgery, can improve asthma control and reduce CRP levels in the blood, a marker of systemic inflammation. This adipocytic inflammation can propagate inflammatory responses in other organs via the circulatory system, including the airways, which may cause bronchoconstriction and airway hyperresponsiveness. Consequently, inflammatory cytokines can be detected in the lungs of asthmatics with obesity even without antigenic challenge.

TGF-β has also been linked to airway remodelling, a potential complication of asthma resulting in reduced lung function and irreversible airway obstruction.

== Inflammatory granulocyte-based endotyping ==
More recently, another endotyping strategy has been proposed with a focus on inflammatory granulocytic involvement in asthma, yielding four endotypes: eosinophilic, neutrophilic, mixed-granulocytic, and paucigranulocytic asthma.

Asthma endotyping based on inflammatory granulocytic involvement.
Sputum cells		Neutrophils	
	Cell counts	Elevated	Not elevated
Eosinophils	Elevated	mixed-granulocytic asthma ~3% of asthmatics	eosinophilic asthma ~42% of asthmatics
Eosinophils	Not elevated	neutrophilic asthma ~16% of asthmatics	paucigranulocytic asthma ~40% of asthmatics

Other studies than the one conducted by University Asthma Clinic of Liege ascribed the above endotypes to different fractions of asthmatics. However, most studies have found paucigranulocytic asthma to be the most common inflammatory cellular phenotype followed by eosinophilic asthma, and mixed-granulocytic asthma to be the least common one.

=== Paucigranulocytic asthma ===
In inflammatory granulocytic asthma endotyping, paucigranulocytic asthma (PGA) is an endotype wherein neither sputum eosinophil nor neutrophil counts are elevated. According to one hypothesis, these inflammatory granulocytes may have been depleted in past episodes of vigorous inflammation.

Because the definition of PGA only relies on the absence of elevated sputum neutrophils and eosinophils, PGA may, according to GINA's definition, simultaneously be T2-high or T2-low in type 2 inflammation-based endotyping. This is because GINA's definition of T2-high asthma does not require elevated eosinophils so long as at least one T2-high asthma sign is present.

As asthma has primarily been described as a chronic inflammatory disease, the pathogenesis of paucigranulocytic asthma has not yet been elucidated. While granulocytes are not elevated in sputum in PGA, macrophages and mast cells are. Additionally, mitochondrial and metabolic genes seem to be overexpressed in PGA, suggesting that mitochondrial or metabolic dysfunction may play a role. However, more research on PGA is needed.

Most cases of PGA are mild, and PGA itself tends to be milder than other endotypes.

=== Neutrophilic asthma ===
Neutrophilic asthma (NA) is an asthma endotype with elevated sputum neutrophils. Type 1 neutrophilic airway inflammation is associated with respiratory bacterial and fungal infections, resistance to corticosteroids, and severe asthma. Smoking may shift the asthma endotype towards type 1 inflammation.
