= Empathising–systemising theory =

Theory on the psychological basis of autism

The empathising–systemising (E–S) theory is a theory on the psychological basis of autism and male–female neurological differences originally put forward by clinical psychologist Simon Baron-Cohen. It classifies individuals based on abilities in empathic thinking (E) and systematic thinking (S). It attempts to explain the social and communication symptoms in autism spectrum disorders as deficits and delays in empathy combined with intact or superior systemising.

According to Baron-Cohen, the E–S theory has been tested using the Empathy Quotient (EQ) and Systemising Quotient (SQ), developed by him and colleagues, and generates five different 'brain types' depending on the presence or absence of discrepancies between their scores on E or S. E–S profiles show that the profile E>S is more common in females than in males, and the profile S>E is more common in males than in females. Baron-Cohen and associates assert that E–S theory is a better predictor than gender of who chooses STEM subjects.

The E–S theory has been extended into the extreme male brain (EMB) theory of autism and Asperger syndrome, which are associated in the E–S theory with below-average empathy and average or above-average systemising.

Baron-Cohen's studies and theory have been questioned on multiple grounds. For instance, a 1998 study on autism found that overrepresentation of engineers could depend on a socioeconomic status rather than E–S differences.

== History ==
E–S theory was developed by psychologist Simon Baron-Cohen in 2002, as a reconceptualization of cognitive sex differences in the general population. This was done in an effort to understand why the cognitive difficulties in autism appeared to lie in domains in which he says on average females outperformed males, along with why cognitive strengths in autism appeared to lie in domains in which on average males outperformed females. In the first chapter of his 2003 book The Essential Difference, he discusses the bestseller Men Are from Mars, Women Are from Venus, written by John Gray in 1992, and states: "the view that men are from Mars and women Venus paints the differences between the two sexes as too extreme. The two sexes are different, but are not so different that we cannot understand each other." The Essential Difference had a second edition published in 2009.

The 2003 edition of The Essential Difference discusses two different sources of inspiration for Baron-Cohen's E-S theory. The first inspiration is epistemological with a number of influences including historicism and the German separation between erklären and verstehen, which Wilhelm Windelband described as nomothetic and idiographic methods. This was part of the positivism dispute in Germany from 1961 to 1969 where the human sciences and natural sciences (Geisteswissenschaften and Naturwissenschaften) disagreed on how to conduct social science. The second source of inspiration was interpreting gender essentialism from Charles Darwin's seminal book The Descent of Man, and Selection in Relation to Sex. According to The Guardian regarding the publication's 2003 edition:

The book [The Essential Difference] has been five years in the writing, partly because he deemed its subject too politically sensitive for the 1990s, and partly because he first wanted to float his ideas about autism [E-S theory] at scientific conferences, where he says reaction has been largely supportive.

— David Adam, referring to Simon Baron-Cohen, The Guardian

Prior to the development of E-S theory, Baron-Cohen had previously proposed and studied the mind-blindness theory in 1990, which proposed a homogenous (single-cause) explanation of autism as due to either a lack of theory of mind, or developmental delay in theory of mind during childhood. Theory of mind is the ability to attribute mental states to themselves or others. The mind-blindness theory could explain social and communication difficulties, but could not explain other key traits of autism including unusually narrow interests and highly repetitive behaviors. Mind-blindness was later largely rejected by academia in response to strong evidence for the heterogeneity of autism, although some proponents in academia including Baron-Cohen existed as of March 2011.

== Research ==
According to Baron-Cohen, females on average score higher on measures of empathy and males on average score higher on measures of systemising. This has been found using the child and adolescent versions of the Empathy Quotient (EQ) and the Systemising Quotient (SQ), which are completed by parents about their child/adolescent, and on the self-report version of the EQ and SQ in adults.

Baron-Cohen and associates say that similar sex differences on average have been found using performance tests of empathy such as facial emotion recognition tasks and on performance tests of systemising such as measures of mechanical reasoning or 'intuitive physics'. He has also argued that these sex differences are not only due to socialization. In a 2018 article published in the Proceedings of the National Academy of Sciences (PNAS), Baron-Cohen's team demonstrated the robustness of the theory on sample of half a million individuals.

== Fetal testosterone ==
While experience and socialization contribute to the observed sex differences in empathy and systemising, Baron-Cohen and colleagues suggest that biology also plays a role. A candidate biological factor influencing E and S is fetal testosterone (FT). FT levels are positively correlated with scores on the Systemising Quotient and are negatively correlated with scores on the Empathy Quotient. A new field of research has emerged to investigate the role of testosterone levels in autism. Correlational research demonstrated that elevated rates of testosterone were associated with higher rates of autistic traits, lower rates of eye contact, and higher rates of other medical conditions. Furthermore, experimental studies showed that altering testosterone levels influences the maze performance in rats, having implications for human studies. The fetal testosterone theories posit that the level of testosterone in the womb influences the development of sexually dimorphic brain structures, resulting in sex differences and autistic traits in individuals.

Baron-Cohen and colleagues performed a study in 2014 using 19,677 samples of amniotic fluid to show that people who would later develop autism had elevated fetal steroidogenic levels, including testosterone.

== Evolutionary explanations for sex differences ==
Baron-Cohen presents several possible evolutionary psychological explanations for this sex difference. For example, he says that better empathising may improve care of children, and that better empathy may also improve women's social network which may help in various ways with the caring of children. On the other hand, he says that systemising may help males become good hunters and increase their social status by improving spatial navigation and the making and use of tools.

== Extreme male brain theory of autism ==
Baron-Cohen's work in systemising-empathising led him to investigate whether higher levels of fetal testosterone explain the increased prevalence of autism spectrum disorders among males in his theory known as the "extreme male brain" theory of autism. A review of his book The Essential Difference published in Nature in 2003 summarises his proposals as: "the male brain is programmed to systemize and the female brain to empathize ... Asperger's syndrome represents the extreme male brain".

Baron-Cohen and colleagues extended the E–S theory into the extreme male brain theory of autism, which hypothesises that autism shows an extreme of the typical male profile. This theory divides people into five groups:

- Type E, whose empathy is at a significantly higher level than their systemising (E > S).
- Type S, whose systemising is at a significantly higher level than their empathy (S > E).
- Type B (for balanced), whose empathy is at the same level as their systemising (E = S).
- Extreme Type E, whose empathy is above average but whose systemising is below average (E ≫ S).
- Extreme Type S, whose systemising is above average but whose empathy is below average (S ≫ E).

Baron-Cohen says that tests of the E–S model show that twice as many females than males are Type E and twice as many males than females are Type S. 65% of people with autism spectrum conditions are Extreme Type S. The concept of the Extreme Type E brain has been proposed; however, little research has been conducted on this brain profile.

Apart from the research using EQ and SQ, several other similar tests also have found female and male differences and that people with autism or Asperger syndrome on average score similarly to but more extremely than the average male. For example, the brain differences model provides a broad overview of sex differences that are represented in individuals with autism, including brain structures and hormone levels.

Some, but not all, studies have found that brain regions that differ in average size between males and females also differ similarly between people who have autism and those who do not have autism.

Baron-Cohen's research on relatives of people with Asperger syndrome and autism found that their fathers and grandfathers are twice as likely to be engineers as the general population. A follow-up study by David A. Routh and Christopher Jarrold found disproportionate numbers of doctors, scientists, and accountants were fathers of autists, while "skilled and unskilled manual workers are less common as fathers than would be predicted". They hypothesised that this observed overrepresentation of science and accounting among fathers of autistic children could be due to a sampling bias. Another similar finding by Baron-Cohen in California has been referred to as the Silicon Valley phenomenon, where a large portion of the population works in technical fields, and he says autism prevalence rates are ten times higher than the average of the US population. These data suggest that genetics and the environment play a role in autism prevalence, and children with technically minded parents are therefore more likely to be diagnosed with autism.

Another possibility has been proposed that spins the perspective of the extreme male brain. Social theorists have been investigating the concept that females have protective factors against autism by having a more developed language repertoire and more empathy skills. Female children speak earlier and use language more than their male counterparts, and the lack of this skill translates into many symptoms of autism, offering another explanation for the discrepancy in prevalence.

=== Development of brain structures ===
The fetal testosterone theory hypothesises that higher levels of testosterone in the amniotic fluid of mothers push brain development towards improved ability to see patterns and analyse complex systems while diminishing communication and empathy, emphasising "male" traits over "female", or in E–S theory terminology, emphasising "systemising" over "empathising". This theory states that fetal testosterone influences the development of certain structures in the brain, and that these changes relate to behavioral traits seen in those with autism. Males generally have higher levels of fetal testosterone contributing to their brain developing in that particular way.

The extreme male brain theory (EMB), put forward by Baron-Cohen suggests that autistic brains show an exaggeration of the features associated with male brains. These are mainly size and connectivity with males generally having a larger brain with more white matter, leading to increased connectivity in each hemisphere. This is seen in an exaggerated form in the brains of those with ASD. There is a decrease in the total area of the corpus callosum in people with ASD. Individuals with ASD were found to have widespread interconnectivity abnormalities in specific brain regions. This could explain the different results on empathy tests between men and women as well as the deficiencies in empathy seen in ASD as empathy requires several brain regions to be activated which need information from many different areas of the brain. A further example of how brain structure can influence ASD is looking at cases where the corpus callosum does not fully develop (agenesis of corpus callosum). It was found that autism is commonly diagnosed in children where the corpus callosum does not fully develop (45% of children with agenesis of the corpus callosum). A further example of brain structures relating to ASD is that children with ASD tend to have a larger amygdala, this is another example of being an extreme version of the male brain which generally has a larger amygdala.

These brain differences have all been shown to have an influence on social cognition and communication. High levels of fetal testosterone have also been shown to be related to behavior associated with autism, such as eye contact. Studies examining the relationship between prenatal testosterone levels and autistic traits found that high levels correlated with traits such as decreased eye contact. These were present in both sexes. This suggests that fetal testosterone (fT) is the cause of sex differences in the brain and that there is a link between fT levels and ASD. In general females with autism have a higher rate of medical conditions which are related to high androgen levels and both males and females with autism have higher than average androgen levels. Males have higher fT levels naturally meaning that there is less of a change required in the hormone levels to reach a point high enough to cause the developmental changes seen in autism. This is a possible cause for the male prevalence seen in autism.

== Cognitive versus affective empathy ==
Empathy can be subdivided into two major components:

- cognitive empathy (also termed 'mentalising'), the ability to understand another's mental state;
- affective or emotional empathy, the ability to emotionally respond to another's mental states. Affective empathy can be subdivided into personal distress (self-centered feelings of discomfort and anxiety in response to another's suffering) and empathic concern (sympathy towards others that are suffering).

Studies found that individuals with autism spectrum disorder (ASD) self-report lower levels of empathic concern, show less or absent comforting responses toward someone who is suffering, and report equal or higher levels of personal distress compared to controls. The combination of reduced empathic concern and increased personal distress may lead to the overall reduction of empathy in ASD.

Studies also suggest that individuals with ASD may have impaired theory of mind, involving the ability to understand the perspectives of others. The terms cognitive empathy and theory of mind are often used synonymously, but due to a lack of studies comparing theory of mind with types of empathy, it is unclear whether these are equivalent. Notably, many reports on the empathic deficits of individuals with Asperger syndrome are actually based on impairments in theory of mind.

Baron-Cohen argued that psychopathy is associated with intact cognitive empathy but reduced affective empathy while ASD is associated with both reduced cognitive and affective empathy.

== Criticism ==
Empathising-Systemising theory has also been criticised, from various points of view.

A 2004 review of Baron-Cohen's book The Essential Difference by philosopher Neil Levy in Phenomenology and the Cognitive Sciences characterised it as "very disappointing" with a "superficial notion of intelligence", concluding that Baron-Cohen's major claims about mind-blindness and systemising–empathising are "at best, dubious".

In a 2011 article in Time magazine, journalist and author Judith Warner wrote that Baron-Cohen "most dramatically wandered into fraught territory in 2003, when he published the book The Essential Difference, which called autism a manifestation of an extreme 'male brain'—one that's 'predominantly hard-wired for understanding and building systems,' as opposed to a 'female brain,' one that's 'predominantly hard-wired for empathy'—and ended up on the wrong side of the debate on science and sex differences."

In a 2003 book review published in the journal Nature, human biologist Joyce Benenson, while showing vivid interest in Baron-Cohen's findings on systemising, put in doubt the relative negative difference in empathising of males:

"The idea that males are more interested in systemizing than females merits serious consideration ... It is unquestionably a novel and fascinating idea that seems likely to generate a rich empirical body of literature as its properties are tested. The second part of the theory—that females are more empathic than males—is more problematic ... Other measures, however, show that males are highly socially skilled."

Others have criticised the original EQ and SQ, which form most of the research basis behind the notions of empathising and systemising. Both measure more than one factor, and sex differences exist on only some of the factors. In a 2003 Wall Street Journal article, Robert McGough wrote about responses to the theory by neurologist and pediatrician Isabelle Rapin and psychologist Helen Tager-Flusberg:

Isabelle Rapin ... finds Dr. Baron-Cohen's theory "provocative" but adds that "it does not account for some of the many neurological features of the disorder, like the motor symptoms [such as repetitive movements and clumsiness], the sleep problems or the seizures." Others worry that the term "extreme male brain" could be misinterpreted. Males are commonly associated with "qualities such as aggression", says Helen Tager-Flusberg ... "What's dangerous is that's the inference people will make: Oh, these are extreme males."

Some research in systemising and empathising in early life indicates that boys and girls develop in similar ways, casting doubt on the theory of sex differences in these areas. A cognitive style that more naturally opposes empathising, which has been given the name Machiavellianism, emphasises self-interest and has been shown to be strongly correlated with competitiveness. Evolutionary theory predicts that typical males will be more competitive than typical females. In contrast, research has generally shown a weak negative correlation between empathising and systemising. (It is worth noting that weak correlation between empathising and systemising would support treating them as independent variables, i.e., as distinct dimensions of personality, each of which may or may not correlate with an individual's biological sex or preferred gender.)

The 'extreme male brain' theory has also been criticised, with critics saying that the tests behind this theory are based on gender stereotypes, and not on hard science. Psychologist and leading autism researcher Catherine Lord says the theory is based on "gross misinterpretations" of developmental data. Psychiatrist David Skuse has claimed that communication differences between genders are likely to be small. Psychiatrist Meng-Chuan Lai says the study results have not been replicated.

Lizzie Buchen, a science journalist for Nature's news feature section, wrote in 2011 that because Baron-Cohen's work has focused on higher-functioning individuals with autism spectrum disorders, his work requires independent replication with broader samples. Mirroring Helen Tager-Flusberg's 2003 warnings, Buchen added that it could lead to hurtful discriminatory views of autistic children "Some critics are also rankled by Baron-Cohen's history of headline-grabbing theories—particularly one that autism is an 'extreme male' brain state. They worry that his theory about technically minded parents may be giving the public wrong ideas, including the impression that autism is linked to being a 'geek'." In a 2003 article in The Spectator, philosopher Hugh Lawson-Tancred wrote "The emphasis on the ultra-maleness approach is no doubt attributable to the fact that Baron-Cohen works mainly with higher functioning autism and Asperger's syndrome."

As a basis for his theory, Baron-Cohen cited a study done on newborn infants in which baby boys looked longer at an object and baby girls looked longer at a person. However, Elizabeth Spelke's 2005 review of studies done with very young children found no consistent differences between boys and girls. Subsequent research showed that there could indeed be a sex difference between males and females, but that males actually looked more at human faces than females on average. A European Union Horizon 2020 backed research program in brain and autism research pointed at genetic factors, confirming individual differences in object or human proclivities in babies but did not confirm the sex difference.

In her 2010 book Delusions of Gender, Cordelia Fine pointed to Baron-Cohen's views as an example of "neurosexism". She also criticised some of the experimental work that Baron-Cohen cited in support of his views as being methodologically flawed.

In her 2017 book Inferior: How Science Got Women Wrong and the New Research That's Rewriting the Story, science journalist Angela Saini criticised Cohen's research, arguing that he had overstated the significance of his findings, that the study on babies on which he based much of his research has not been successfully replicated, and that his studies of fetal testosterone levels have not provided evidence for his theories.

Neuroscientist Gina Rippon criticised Baron-Cohen's theories in her 2019 book The Gendered Brain: The new neuroscience that shatters the myth of the female brain. Speaking in 2020, she called his book The Essential Difference "neurotrash", and characterised his research methods as "weak". Rippon has also argued against using "male" and "female" for describing different types of brains which do not correspond to genders. Reviewing her work for Nature, neuroscientist Lise Eliot supported Rippon's point of view, and wrote "The hunt for male and female distinctions inside the skull is a lesson in bad research practice".

== See also ==
- Neuroscience of sex differences
- The NeuroGenderings Network
