= Flora =

Plant species in a given region

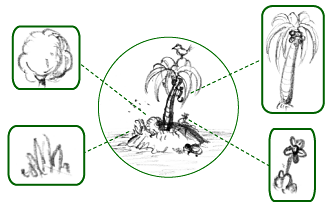
Simplified schematic of an island's flora all its plant species, highlighted in boxes

Flora (pl.: floras or florae) is an ecological term describing all assemblages of plant life present in a particular region or time, generally the naturally occurring (indigenous) native plants. The corresponding term for animals is fauna; and for fungi, it is funga. When describing ecosystems (particularly aquatic ecosystems), the term often more broadly include other non-plant organisms that are also photosynthetic autotrophs, such as phytoplanktons (which include cyanobacteria and microalgae), macroalgae and lichens (which are symbionts of fungi with green algae or cyanobacteria).

The term flora is also used in microbiology and infectious disease medicine to describe the collective communities of commensal/beneficial and parasitic microbes that live on or inside the body of another organism (especially an animal, e.g. a human), which include bacteria (e.g. enteric bacteria and most probiotics), archaea (e.g. methanogens), fungi (e.g. human ear mycobiota), protists (e.g. rumen ciliates and termite parabasalids) and viruses (e.g. the human virome). Examples of such expressions include gut flora, respiratory flora and skin flora (see list of human microbiota).

== Etymology ==
The word "flora" comes from the Latin name of Flora, the goddess of plants, flowers, and fertility in Roman mythology. The technical term "flora" is then derived from a metonymy of this goddess at the end of the sixteenth century. It was first used in poetry to denote the natural vegetation of an area, but soon also assumed the meaning of a work cataloguing such vegetation. Moreover, "Flora" was used to refer to the flowers of an artificial garden in the seventeenth century.

The distinction between vegetation (the general appearance of a community) and flora (the taxonomic composition of a community) was first made by Jules Thurmann (1849). Prior to this, the two terms were used interchangeably.

== Classifications ==
Plants are grouped into floras based on region (floristic regions), period, special environment, or climate. Regions can be distinct habitats like mountain vs. flatland. Floras can mean plant life of a historic era as in fossil flora. Lastly, floras may be subdivided by special environments:

- Native flora. The native and indigenous flora of an area.
- Agricultural and horticultural flora (garden flora). The plants that are deliberately grown by humans.
- Weed flora. Traditionally this classification was applied to plants regarded as undesirable and studied in efforts to control or eradicate them. Today the designation is less often used as a classification of plant life since it includes three different types of plants: weedy species, invasive species (that may or may not be weedy), and native and introduced non-weedy species that are agriculturally undesirable. Many native plants previously considered weeds have been shown to be beneficial or even necessary to various ecosystems.

== Documentation ==
The botanical continents of the World Geographical Scheme for Recording Plant Distributions, used for classifying floras geographically

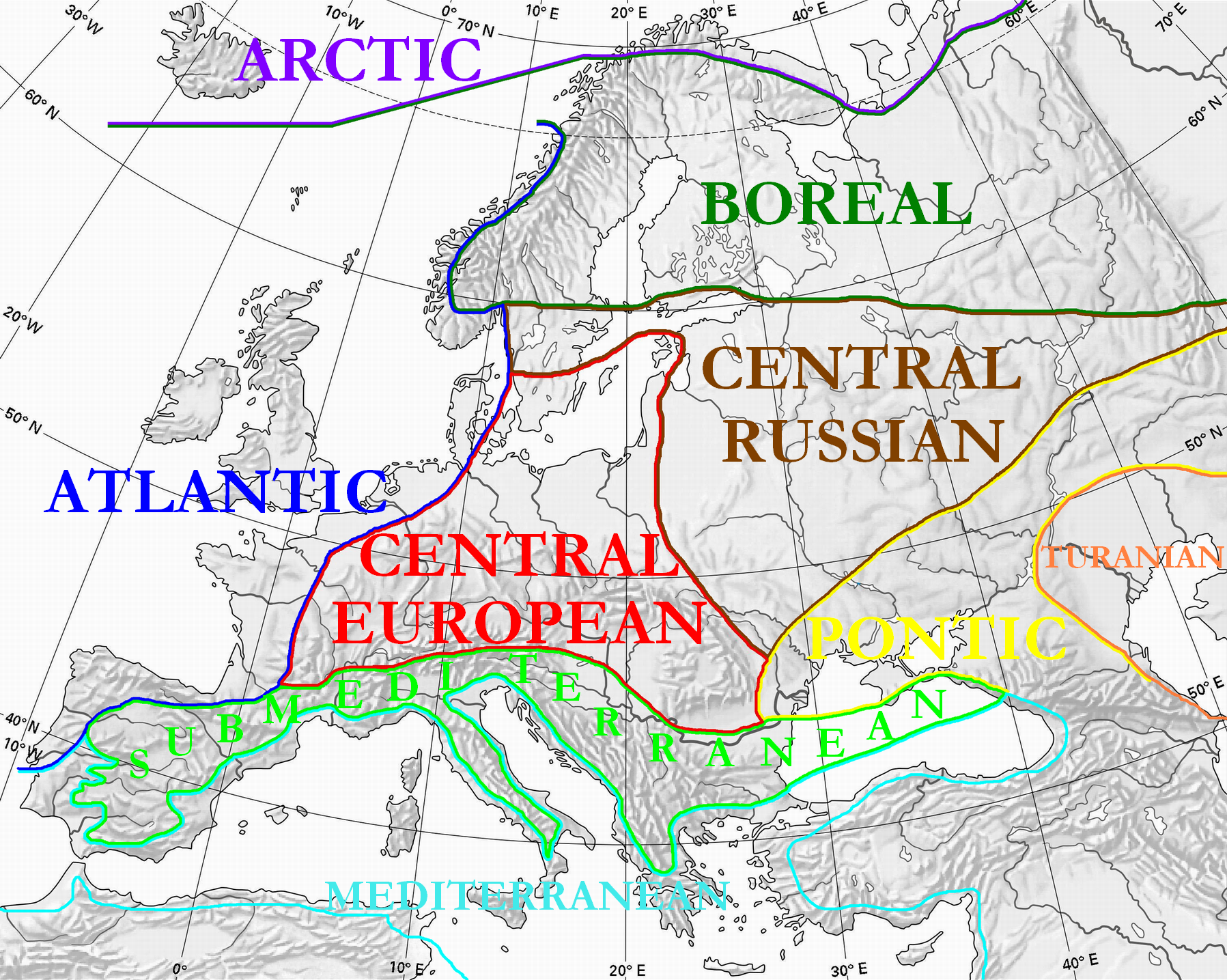
Floristic regions in Europe according to Wolfgang Frey and Rainer Lösch

The flora of a particular area or time period can be documented in a publication also known as a "flora" (often capitalized as "Flora" to distinguish the two meanings when they might be confused). Floras may require specialist botanical knowledge to use with any effectiveness. Traditionally they are books, but some are now published on CD-ROM or websites.

Simon Paulli's Flora Danica of 1648 is probably the first book titled "Flora" to refer to the plant world of a certain region. It mainly describes medicinal plants growing in Denmark. The Flora Sinensis by the Polish Jesuit Michał Boym is another early example of a book titled "Flora". However, despite its title it covered not only plants but also some animals of the region, that is China and India.

A published flora often contains diagnostic keys. Often these are dichotomous keys, which require the user to examine a plant repeatedly, and decide which one of two alternatives given best applies to the plant.

== See also ==
- Biome — a major regional group of distinctive plant and animal communities
- Fauna
- Fauna and Flora Preservation Society
- Funga – a term equivalent to flora for fungi
- Herbal
- Horticultural flora
- Megaflora
- Pharmacopoeia
- The Plant List
- Vegetation — a general term for the plant life of a region
- World Flora Online

Categories

- Flora by continent
- Flora by country
- Flora by ecoregion
- Flora by floristic kingdom
