= Mind-blindness =

Hypothesis regarding theory of mind in autistic people

Mind-blindness, mindblindness or mind blindness is a widely disputed theory initially proposed in 1990 that claims that all autistic people have a lack or developmental delay of theory of mind (ToM), meaning they are less able to attribute mental states to others. According to the theory, a lack of ToM is considered equivalent to a lack of both cognitive and affective empathy. In the context of the theory, mind-blindness implies being unable to predict behavior and attribute mental states including beliefs, desires, emotions, or intentions of other people. The mind-blindness theory asserts that children who delay in this development will often develop autism.

One of the main proponents of mind-blindness was Simon Baron-Cohen, who later pioneered empathising–systemising theory. Over the years, the mind-blindness hypothesis has faced many criticisms from the scientific community due to inconclusive empirical evidence, mixed findings with different ToM tasks, repetitive failed replications of some (but not all) classic ToM studies, failure to take account into the bidirectional nature of social interactions (the double empathy problem), and consistent evidence (including some studies by Baron-Cohen in the 2010s and 2020s) of substantial heterogeneity of autistic people in ToM and empathy measures.

== Theory of mind ==
Mind-blindness is defined as a state where the ToM has not been developed in an individual. According to the theory, non-autistic people can make automatic interpretations of events taking into consideration the mental states of people, their desires, and beliefs. Individuals lacking ToM would therefore perceive the world in a confusing and frightening manner, leading to a social withdrawal. The theory was based on the assumption that biology is linked to autistic behavior, so it was expected that a delayed development or lack of ToM would lead to additional psychiatric complications. Research into a model with more than two categories was also considered.

Mind-blindness, a lack of ToM, was later theorised to be equivalent to a lack of empathy, although research published a year later suggests there is considerable overlap but not complete equivalence. It was empirically demonstrated that processing of complex cognitive emotions is more difficult than processing simpler emotions. In addition, evidence existed at the time that autism was not correlated with the failure of social bonding and attachment in childhood. This was interpreted to suggest that emotion is a component of social cognition that is separable from mentalizing.

=== Biological basis ===
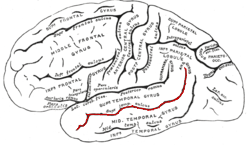
Superior temporal sulcus

Since the frontal lobe is associated with executive function, it was predicted that the frontal lobe plays an important role in ToM; that executive function and ToM share the same functional regions in the brain. Damage to the frontal lobe is known to affect ToM, partially confirming this hypothesis. From a 2000 study, it was found that a neural network that comprised the medial prefrontal cortex, the anterior cingulate cortex, the circumscribed region of the anterior paracingulate cortex and the superior temporal sulcus, is crucial for the normal functioning of ToM and self monitoring. Although there is a possibility that ToM and mind-blindness could explain executive function deficits, it was argued that autism is not identified with the failure of executive function alone. It has also been shown that the right temporo-parietal junction behaves differently in those with autism, and the middle cingulate cortex is less active in autistic people during mentalization.

== History and relationship to autism ==
=== Mind-blindness of autistic people relative to non-autistic people ===
In an attempt to empirically explain the tendency of autistic people to avoid eye contact, in 1995 it was proposed that autistic children fail to "read" the eyes of others. Simon Baron-Cohen and colleagues extended this hypothesis, publishing the “Reading the Mind in the Eyes” (RMET) as a test of the ability to attribute mental states to oneself or another person. It was suggested that the mind-blindness hypothesis may explain more severe symptoms of autism, including social withdrawal and social skill deficiencies. Lower performance on the RMET has been found to correlate with autism, suggesting that mentalisation theory helps explain autism, especially its social skill deficiencies.

However, the generally unclear physiological basis of mentalization at the time limited a broader understating of the correlation. Several researchers have also raised concerns about the validity of RMET scores. In a recent review of 804 studies, Higgins and colleagues found that 63% of studies failed to provide evidence of its validity across six dimensions, questioning whether RMET tests actually measure what it aims to do. The authors raise concerns of its widespread use as a test of mind blindness.

In the 1996 book Theories of Mind, Peter Carruthers argues in support of the mind-blindness hypothesis in spite of inconclusive evidence for its generalisation. Recognising the hypothesis has lost popularity, Carruthers argues this is mainly due to the disregard of its proponents to consider the perspectives of autistic people. The latter view is shared by David Smukler in his 2005 analysis of the history of the ToM in autism research.

The assumption that autism is a homogenous condition underpinned by a ToM deficit, genetics, neurological abnormalities, or a 'failure of understanding' as implied by the mind-blindness hypothesis was questioned shortly after its publication. This contrasts with autism as heterogeneous. There is now a large pool of strong evidence supporting the heterogeneity of autism, and general scientific consensus accepts this as contrary to the original mind-blindness hypothesis, although there has existed some disagreement that heterogeneity is incompatible with alternative mind-blindness definitions.

An author of the original mind-blindness hypothesis, Simon Baron-Cohen, later published foundational research in empathising–systemising theory, which asserts there exist neurological sex differences in autism, and that such differences are not due exclusively to socialization.

=== Mind-blindness of non-autistic people relative to autistic people ===
The double empathy problem, first proposed in 2012 by Damian Milton, is a theory in opposition of the mind-blindness hypothesis. It proposes that social and communication difficulties present in autistic people are due to a reciprocal lack of understanding and mutual differences in dispositions and experiences between autistic and non-autistic people, as opposed to an asymmetric theory such as the mind-blindness hypothesis. There is a growing body of evidence supporting the double empathy problem. A possible explanation supported empirically is that the reciprocal lack of understanding is because "we interpret others' actions according to models built through experience with our own actions".

== See also ==
- Alexithymia
- Causes of autism
