= Simon Baron-Cohen =

British psychologist and author (born 1958)

Sir Simon Baron-Cohen FBA FBPsS FMedSci FRSM
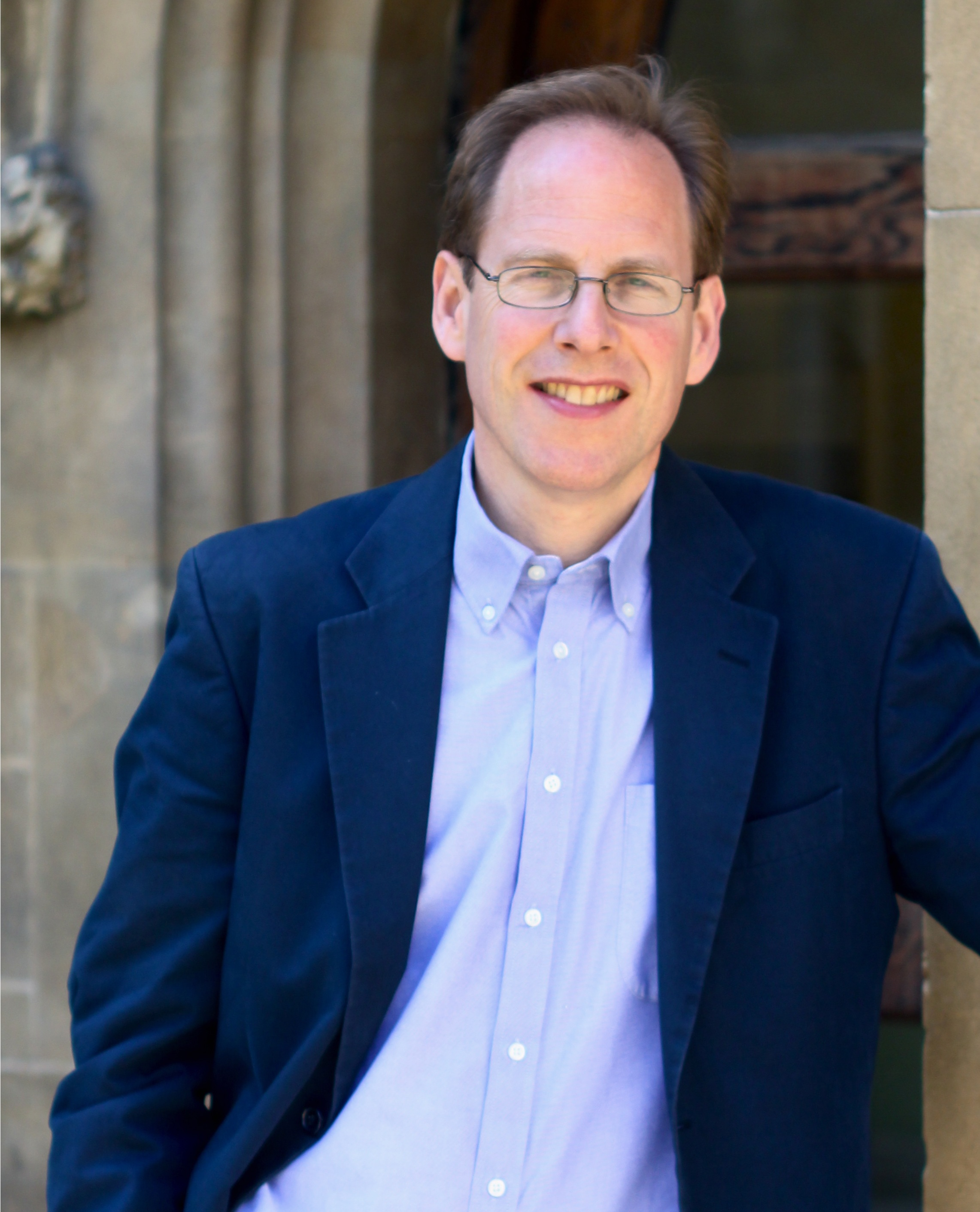
- Baron-Cohen in 2011
- Born: Simon Philip Baron-Cohen; 15 August 1958 (age 68); Hampstead, London, England
- Education: New College, Oxford (BA); King's College London (MPhil); University College London (PhD)
- Known for: Autism research
- Spouse: Bridget Lindley (m. 1987; died 2016)
- Children: 3
- Awards: Kanner-Asperger Medal (2013); MRC Millennium Medal (2023); Grawemeyer Award in Psychology (2026)
- Scientific career
- Fields: Psychology; cognitive neuroscience
- Workplaces: University of Cambridge
- Thesis: Social Cognition and Pretend-Play in Autism (1985)
- Doctoral advisor: Uta Frith

Sir Simon Philip Baron-Cohen (born 15 August 1958) is a British clinical psychologist and professor of developmental psychopathology at the University of Cambridge. He is the director of the university's Autism Research Centre and a Fellow of Trinity College.

Baron-Cohen has worked in autism research for over 40 years, starting in 1982. In 1985, Baron-Cohen formulated the mindblindness theory of autism, the evidence for which he collated and published in 1995. In 1997, he formulated the prenatal sex steroid theory of autism, the key test of which was published in 2015. In 2003, Baron-Cohen formulated the empathising-systemising (E-S) theory of autism and typical sex differences, the key test of which was published in 2018.

Baron-Cohen has also made major contributions to both basic and applied research in autism, and to the field of synaesthesia. He was knighted in the 2021 New Year Honours for services to people with autism. In 2023, Baron-Cohen was awarded the Medical Research Council (MRC) Millennium Medal. He is the 2026 recipient of the Grawemeyer Award in Psychology.

== Early life and education ==
Baron-Cohen was born into a Jewish family in London, the second son of Judith and Hyman Vivian Baron-Cohen. Baron-Cohen has an elder brother, Dan Baron Cohen, and three younger siblings: brother Ash Baron-Cohen and sisters Suzie and Liz. His cousins include actor and comedian Sacha Baron Cohen and composer Erran Baron Cohen.

His maternal uncle was Canadian racing driver and constructor David Greenblatt. His maternal great-uncle was endocrinologist Robert Benjamin Greenblatt.

Baron-Cohen completed a BA in human sciences at New College, Oxford, and an MPhil in clinical psychology at the Institute of Psychiatry, King's College London. He received a PhD in psychology at University College London; Baron-Cohen's doctoral research was in collaboration with his supervisor, Uta Frith.

== Career ==
Baron-Cohen is professor of developmental psychopathology at the University of Cambridge in the United Kingdom. He is the director of the university's Autism Research Centre and a Fellow of Trinity College.

He is a Fellow of the British Psychological Society (BPS), the British Academy, the Academy of Medical Sciences, the Royal Society of Medicine, the International Society for Autism Research and the Association for Psychological Science. He is a BPS Chartered Psychologist and a Senior Investigator at the National Institute for Health and Care Research (NIHR).

Baron-Cohen serves as vice-president of the National Autistic Society (UK), and was the 2012 chair of the National Institute for Health and Care Excellence (NICE) Guideline Development Group for adults with autism. He has served as vice-president and president of the International Society for Autism Research (INSAR). Baron-Cohen was the founding co-editor-in-chief of the journal Molecular Autism.

He was the chair of the Psychology Section of the British Academy. As a clinical psychologist he created the first clinic in the UK for late adult autism diagnosis.

Baron-Cohen gave the keynote lecture on the topic of "Autism and Human Rights" at the United Nations on World Autism Awareness Day in 2017.

== Research ==
=== The mindblindness theory of autism ===
In 1985, while he was member of the MRC Cognitive Development Unit (CDU) in London, Baron-Cohen and his colleagues Uta Frith and Alan Leslie formulated the "theory of mind" (ToM) hypothesis, to explain the social-communication difficulties in autism. ToM (also known as "cognitive empathy") is the brain's partially innate mechanism for rapidly making sense of social behavior by effortlessly attributing mental states to others, enabling behavioral prediction and social communication skills. They confirmed this using the false belief test, showing that a typical four-year-old child can infer another person's belief that is different to their own, while autistic children on average are delayed in this ability.

Baron-Cohen's 1995 book, Mindblindness summarized his subsequent experiments in ToM and the disability in ToM in autism. Using the "reading the mind in the eyes test" (or "Eyes Test") he designed, Baron-Cohen interpreted evidence that may suggest that autistic children are blind to the mentalistic significance of the eyes and show difficulties in advanced ToM.

He conducted the first neuroimaging study of ToM in typical and autistic adults, and studied patients with acquired brain damage, demonstrating lesions in the orbito- and medial-prefrontal cortex and amygdala can impair ToM. Baron-Cohen also reported the first evidence of atypical amygdala function in autism during ToM. In 2017, his team studied 80,000 genotyped individuals who took the eyes test. Baron-Cohen found single nucleotide polymorphisms (SNPs) partly contribute to individual differences on this dimensional trait measure on which autistic people show difficulties. This was the evidence that cognitive empathy/ToM is partly heritable. The National Institutes of Health recommended Baron-Cohen's eyes test as a core measure that should be used as part of the Research Domain Criteria (RDOC) for assessing social cognition.

=== Empathizing-systemizing (E-S) theory ===
In 2003, Baron-Cohen developed the empathizing-systemizing (E-S) theory. Empathizing includes both cognitive empathy (imagining what someone else is thinking or feeling) and affective empathy (responding with an appropriate emotion to what someone is thinking or feeling). Systemizing is the drive to analyse or construct rule-based systems to understand how things work. A system is defined as anything that follows if-and-then patterns or rules.

The E-S theory argues that typical females on average score higher on empathizing relative to systemizing (they are more likely to have a brain of type E), and typical males on average score higher on systemizing relative to empathizing (they are more likely to have a brain of type S). Autistic people are predicted to score as an extreme of the typical male (they are more likely to have a brain of type S or extreme type S). These predictions were confirmed in a 2018 online study of 600,000 non-autistic people and 36,000 autistic people. This has been confirmed in a large meta-analysis of 34 studies involving 1.2 million people. This also confirmed that autistic people on average are "hyper-systemizers". In 2026, his group showed 130 newborns, on average 33 hours old, a video of a human face and a video of a moving Newton's cradle. Girls devoted a greater proportion of their looking time to the face than boys did, while the two sexes did not differ in how long they looked at either video in absolute terms.

Working with the personal genomics company 23andMe, Baron-Cohen's team studied 56,000 genotyped individuals who had taken the Systemizing Quotient. He and his colleagues found that the common genetic variants associated with systemizing overlapped with the common genetic variants associated with autism. Baron-Cohen concluded that the genetics of autism not only includes genes associated with disability, but also include genes associated with talent in pattern recognition and understanding how things work. In his 2020 book The Pattern Seekers, Baron-Cohen explored the idea that 'if-and-then' hyper-systemising is the basis of invention, and celebrates how autistic people played a key role in the evolution of human invention.

=== Prenatal neuroendocrinology ===
In his 2004 book Prenatal Testosterone in Mind (MIT Press), Baron-Cohen put forward the prenatal sex steroid theory of autism. He proposed this theory to understand why autism is more common in males. Using the Cambridge Child Development Project that Baron-Cohen established in 1997, a longitudinal study studying children of 600 women who had undergone amniocentesis in pregnancy, he followed these children postnatally. This study demonstrated, for the first time in humans, how normative variation in amniotic prenatal testosterone levels correlates with individual differences in typical postnatal brain and behavioral development. Baron-Cohen's team discovered that in typical children, amount of eye contact, rate of vocabulary development, quality of social relationships, theory of mind performance, and scores on the empathy quotient are all inversely correlated with prenatal testosterone levels. In contrast, they found that scores on the embedded figures test (of attention to detail), on the systemizing quotient (SQ), measures of narrow interests, and number of autistic traits are positively correlated with prenatal testosterone levels. Within this study, Baron-Cohen's team conducted the first human neuroimaging studies of brain grey matter regional volumes and brain activity associated with prenatal testosterone.

But to really test the theory, Baron-Cohen needed a much larger sample than his Cambridge Child Development Project, autism only occurs in 3% of the population. So, in 2015, he set up a collaboration with the Danish Biobank which has stored over 20 thousand amniotic fluid samples, which Baron-Cohen linked to later diagnosis of autism via the Danish Psychiatric Register. He tested the prenatal androgens and found that children later diagnosed as autistic were exposed to elevated levels of prenatal testosterone, and the Δ4 sex steroid precursors to prenatal testosterone. In 2020, Baron-Cohen tested the same cohort's levels of exposure to prenatal estrogens and again found these were elevated in pregnancies that resulted in autism.

Other clues for the theory came from his postnatal hormonal studies which found that autistic adults have elevated circulating androgens in serum and that the autistic brain in women is 'masculinized' in both grey and white matter brain volume. An independent animal model showed that elevated prenatal testosterone during pregnancy leads to reduced social interest in the offspring. Baron-Cohen's group also studied the rate of autism in offspring of mothers with polyendocrine metabolic ovarian syndrome (PMOS), a medical condition caused by elevated prenatal testosterone. He found that in women with PMOS, the odds of having a child with autism are significantly increased. This has been replicated in three other countries (Sweden, Finland, and Israel) and is in line with the finding that mothers of autistic children themselves have elevated sex steroid hormones. These novel studies provide evidence of the role of prenatal hormones, interacting with genetic predisposition, in the cause of autism. In 2026, Baron-Cohen and colleagues reviewed 25 years of work on the theory in Nature Human Behaviour, concluding that evidence from prenatal androgens and estrogens, from genetics and from stem-cell-derived neural organoids supports it.

=== Other contributions ===
In 2006, Baron-Cohen proposed the assortative mating theory which states that if individuals with a systemizing or "type S" brain type have a child, the child is more likely to be autistic. One piece of evidence for this theory came from his population study in Eindhoven, where autism rates are twice as high in that city which is an IT hub, compared to other Dutch cities. He also found both mothers and fathers of autistic children score above average on tests of attention to detail, a prerequisite for strong systemizing.

In 2001, Baron-Cohen developed the autism-spectrum quotient (AQ), a set of 50 questions that measures how many autistic traits a person has. This was one of the first measures to show that autistic traits run right through the general population and that autistic people on average simply score higher than non-autistic people. The finding that AQ is associated with scientific and mathematical talent has been found in multiple studies, suggesting these may have shared mechanism such as strong systemizing. The AQ has subsequently been used in hundreds of studies including one study of half a million people, showing robust sex differences and higher scores in those who work in STEM. Multiple studies have also shown that both psychological and biological variables correlate with the number of autistic traits a person has.

Baron-Cohen also developed Mindreading, for use in special education. His team also developed The Transporters, an animation series aimed at teaching emotion recognition to younger autistic children, and conducted the first clinical trial of lego therapy in the UK, finding that autistic children improve in social skills following this.

Baron-Cohen has also contributed to applied autism research. He found that autistic people are being failed by the criminal justice system, and have higher rates of suicidality, higher rates of postnatal depression, and higher rates of mental and physical health conditions.

=== Reception ===
Spectrum News had described the work of Baron-Cohen on theory of mind as "a landmark study". The Lancet described him as "a man with extraordinary knowledge, but his passionate advocacy for a more tolerant, diverse society, where difference is respected and cultivated, reveals a very human side to his science".

Baron-Cohen's book The Essential Difference was described by The Guardian as "compelling and inspiring" while his book, The Pattern Seekers was selected as the Editor's Choice by The The New York Times. A book review published in Phenomenology and the Cognitive Sciences characterized The Essential Difference as "very disappointing".

Baron-Cohen and his book The Science of Evil were described by The New York Times "an award-winning psychologist" who had "unveiled a simple but persuasive hypothesis for a new way to think about evil."

Feminist scientists, including Cordelia Fine, neuroscientist Gina Rippon, and Lise Eliot have questioned his extreme male brain theory of autism. Baron-Cohen has defended the study of sex differences against their charges of neurosexism, clarifying that gender differences only apply to differences on average between groups of males and females, and agrees that it would be sexist and unacceptable to prejudge an individual based on their gender since a person's mind may not be typical of their gender. A large study in 2018 found the E-S and extreme male brain theories to be supported by multiple large data sets.

Critics also argue that Baron-Cohen's focus on autistic people without intellectual or learning disability limits how far his findings can be generalised. Baron-Cohen challenges this criticism in pointing out that even among those with learning disability, strong systemizing is observed.

The theory of mind deficit hypothesis has faced criticisms from some people in the autism community and from researchers. Baron-Cohen has commented that many studies have replicated the findings with group-level on-average differences, despite the heterogeneity of autism in terms of empathy and ToM.

Some people in the autism community have argued that non-autistic people are as blind to the mental states of autistic people as autistic people are to those of non-autistic people. This is referred to as the double empathy problem.

In a recent article Baron-Cohen and colleagues identified 23 meta-analyses of ToM in autism, involving dozens of studies and large numbers of autistic people, studied over the past 40 years, and in 22 out of 23 of these meta-analyses, autistic people scored statistically lower than non-autistic people. This suggests that despite differences in methodology, cohorts, and decades, degrees of disability in ToM are one feature of autistic people, on average.

A 2024 systematic scoping review questioned the validity of Eyes Test scores as a measure of ToM, despite the test's widespread use. That review has itself been challenged in a commentary in the same journal, which concluded that its recommendation to abandon the test was unwarranted.

== Recognition ==
Baron-Cohen was awarded the 1990 Spearman Medal from the BPS, the McAndless Award from the American Psychological Association, the 1993 May Davidson Award for Clinical Psychology from the BPS, and the 2006 Presidents' Award from the BPS.

Baron-Cohen received an honorary Doctor of Science degree from Abertay University in 2012, and from Roehampton University in 2012, and was awarded the Kanner-Asperger Medal in 2013 by the Wissenschaftliche Gesellschaft Autismus-Spektrum as a Lifetime Achievement Award for his contributions to autism research. He was also knighted in the 2021 New Year Honours for services to people with autism.

Baron-Cohen's Mindreading and The Transporters special educational software were nominated for the British Academy of Film and Television Arts (BAFTA) awards in 2002 and 2007.

In 2023, Baron-Cohen was awarded the Medical Research Council (MRC) Millennium Medal for his work on the prenatal sex steroid theory of autism and his transformative contributions to autism.

In 2026, he was awarded the Grawemeyer Award in Psychology.

== Personal life ==
Baron-Cohen was married to Bridget Lindley from 1987 until her death in 2016. Together, they had three children.

== Selected publications ==
=== Single-authored books ===
- Mindblindness: An Essay on Autism and Theory of Mind. MIT Press/Bradford Books. 1995. ISBN 978-0-262-02384-9.
- The Essential Difference: Men, Women and the Extreme Male Brain. Penguin/Basic Books. 2003. ISBN 978-0-7139-9671-5.
- Autism and Asperger Syndrome. Facts. Oxford University Press. 2008. ISBN 978-0-19-850490-0.
- Zero Degrees of Empathy: A New Theory of Human Cruelty. Penguin/Allen Lane. 2011. ISBN 978-0-7139-9791-0. (published in the US as The Science of Evil: On Empathy and the Origins of Human Cruelty, ISBN 978-0-465-02353-0)
- The Pattern Seekers: A New Theory of Human Invention. Allen Lane. 2020. ISBN 978-0-241-24218-6. (published in the US as The Pattern Seekers: How Autism Drives Human Invention. Basic Books. 2020. ISBN 978-1-5416-4714-5.)

=== Other books ===
- Baron-Cohen S, Tager-Flusberg H, Lombardo MV, eds. (2013). Understanding Other Minds: Perspectives From Social Cognitive Neuroscience (3rd ed.). Oxford University Press. ISBN 978-0-19-852446-5.
- Hadwin J, Howlin P, Baron-Cohen S (2008). Teaching Children with Autism to Mindread: A Practical Guide for Teachers and Parents. Wiley. ISBN 978-0-471-97623-3.
- Baron-Cohen S, Lutchmaya S, Knickmeyer R (2005). Prenatal Testosterone in Mind: Amniotic Fluid Studies. MIT Press/Bradford Books. ISBN 978-0-262-26774-8.
- Baron-Cohen S, Wheelwright S (2004). An Exact Mind: An Artist with Asperger Syndrome. Jessica Kingsley. ISBN 978-1-84310-032-4.
- Baron-Cohen S; Tager-Flusberg H; Cohen DJ, eds. (2000). Understanding Other Minds: Perspectives from Developmental Cognitive Neuroscience (2nd ed.). Oxford University Press. ISBN 978-0-19-852445-8.
- Baron-Cohen S, Harrison J, eds. (1997). Synaesthesia: Classic and Contemporary Readings. Blackwells. ISBN 978-0-631-19763-8.
- Baron-Cohen S, ed. (1997). The Maladapted Mind: Classic Readings in Evolutionary Psychopathology. East Sussex, UK: Psychology Press/Taylor Francis Group. ISBN 978-0-86377-460-7.
- Mary M. Robertson; Simon Baron-Cohen (1998). Tourette's Syndrome: The Facts. Oxford: Oxford University Press. ISBN 978-0-19-852398-7.

=== Selected journal articles ===
- Baron-Cohen S, Leslie AM, Frith U (October 1985). "Does the autistic child have a "theory of mind"?". Cognition. 21 (1): 37–46. doi:10.1016/0010-0277(85)90022-8. PMID 2934210. S2CID 14955234.
- Baron-Cohen S, Knickmeyer RC, Belmonte MK (November 2005). "Sex differences in the brain: implications for explaining autism" (PDF). Science. 310 (5749): 819–823. Bibcode:2005Sci...310..819B. doi:10.1126/science.1115455. PMID 16272115. S2CID 44330420.
- Baron-Cohen S, Tsompanidis A, Srivastava DP, Mill J, Lancaster MA, Adhya D, et al. (May 2026). "The prenatal sex steroid theory of autism after 25 years". Nature Human Behaviour. 10 (5): 841–848. doi:10.1038/s41562-026-02437-0. PMID 42162383.

== See also ==
- Autism-Spectrum Quotient
- Empathising–systemising theory
- Mind-blindness
- Autism Research Centre
