= NDUFAF7 =

Gene of the species Homo sapiens

Identifiers
- Aliases: NDUFAF7, C2orf56, MidA, PRO1853, NADH:ubiquinone oxidoreductase complex assembly factor 7
- External IDs: OMIM: 615898; MGI: 1920944; GeneCards: NDUFAF7
Enzyme activity
EC #	BRENDA	ExPASy	KEGG	MetaCyc
2.1.1.320	↗	↗	↗	↗

Gene location (Mouse)
Chr.	Chromosome 17 (mouse)
Band	17|17 E3	Start	79,244,565 bp
Band	17|17 E3	End	79,255,481 bp
Gene ontology
Molecular function	enzyme binding; protein binding; methyltransferase activity; transferase activity; protein-arginine omega-N symmetric methyltransferase activity
Cellular component	mitochondrial matrix; mitochondrion; extracellular space
Biological process	mitochondrial respiratory chain complex I assembly; ATP metabolic process; methylation; peptidyl-arginine methylation, to symmetrical-dimethyl arginine
Sources:Amigo / QuickGO
Orthologs
Databases	NCBI: entry; OMA: entry
Species	Human	Mouse
Entrez	55471	73694
Ensembl	ENSG00000003509	ENSMUSG00000024082
UniProt	Q7L592	Q9CWG8
RefSeq (mRNA)	NM_001083946; NM_018607; NM_144736	NM_028611; NM_144760
RefSeq (protein)	NP_001077415; NP_653337; NP_001336953; NP_001336954; NP_001336956	NP_082887
Location (UCSC)	n/a	Chr 17: 79.24 – 79.26 Mb
PubMed search
- Wikidata
View/Edit Human	View/Edit Mouse

Protein arginine methyltransferase NDUFAF7, mitochondrial, also known as NADH:ubiquinone oxidoreductase complex assembly factor 7 (NDUFAF7), MidA, C2orf56, or PRO1853, is a protein that in humans is encoded by the NDUFAF7 gene. NDUFAF7 is a methyltransferase mitochondrial assembly enzyme involved in the assembly and stabilization of NADH dehydrogenase (ubiquinone) also known as complex I, which is located in the mitochondrial inner membrane and is the largest of the five complexes of the electron transport chain. Mutations in NDUFAF7 have been associated with pathologic myopia and complex I deficiency.

== Structure ==
NDUFAF7 is located on the p arm of chromosome 2 in position 22.2 and has 14 exons. The NDUFAF7 gene produces a 49.2 kDa protein composed of 441 amino acids. NDUFAF7 is believed to be a part of the S-adenosylmethionine-dependent methyltransferase family. This family has a characteristic seven-β-strand protein fold. NDUFAF7 is a type II arginine methyltransferase, meaning that its enzymatic activity produces a symmetrical ω-N^{G},N^{G′}-dimethylarginine. It has a methyltransferase domain and an N-terminal sequence that corresponds to the recognized mitochondrial-targeting peptide. NDUFAF7's stoichiometry is disputed with some findings indicating that it is a homodimer, while others denote it to be monomeric.

== Function ==
The NDUFAF7 gene encodes an assembly factor protein that is localized in the mitochondria and which helps in the assembly and stabilization of complex I, a large multi-subunit enzyme in the mitochondrial respiratory chain. NADH:ubiquinone oxidoreductase (complex I) is involved in several physiological activities in the cell, including metabolite transport and ATP synthesis. Complex I catalyzes the transfer of electrons from NADH to ubiquinone (coenzyme Q) in the first step of the mitochondrial respiratory chain, resulting in the translocation of protons across the inner mitochondrial membrane. The encoded protein of NDUFAF7 is a methyltransferase that symmetrically dimethylates the ω-N^{G},N^{G′} atoms of Arg85 of subunit NDUFS2 of complex I in the early stages of its assembly. This interaction between NDUFAF7 and NDUFS2 is believed to be transient and it is suggested that this methylation stabilizes a 400 kDa subcomplex primarily associated with the peripheral arm of complex I. Without this methylation, the amount of intact complex I is significantly reduced, illustrating NDUFAF7's importance to the mitochondrial respiratory chain. A pseudogene related to this gene is located on chromosome 8. Alternative splicing results in multiple transcript variants.

== Clinical significance ==
Defects in NDUFAF7 may be a cause of susceptibility to pathologic myopia, a genetically heterogeneous disorder characterized by extreme, familial, early-onset vision loss and described as myopia accompanied by severe deformation of the eye besides excessive elongation of the eye. This defect, a heterozygous D266E missense mutation, also resulted in reduced complex I activity. Due to is role in early assembly of complex I, it has been suggested that mutations affecting NDUFAF7 may be lethal.

== Interactions ==
NDUFAF7 interacts transiently with NDUFS2, dimethylating Arg85 on the subunit. A correlation between the presence of MidA and NDUFS7 was also identified. In addition to co-complexes, NDUFAF4 has protein-protein interactions with LRRK2, q5nfq6_fratt, and q5ngw2_fratt.
