= Clean Air India Movement =

Indian environmental campaign

- Date: 5 May 2015
- Location: New Delhi, India
- Organized by: Blueair India
- Website: Official website

The Clean Air India Movement (CLAIM) is a nationwide environmental awareness campaign launched in India on 5 May 2015 by Blueair, an air purification company.

The initiative aims at raising awareness about air pollution and promoting practical measures for cleaner air. The initiative claims to foster collaboration among government agencies, environmental experts, educational institutions, and citizens to improve air quality standards and reduce pollution sources.

The campaign was formally launched at Purana Qila in New Delhi on World Asthma Day, symbolized by a tree-planting event featuring child prodigy Kautilya Pandit and representatives of Blueair India.

CLAIM promotes "air-friendly" practices through educational drives, online campaigns, and community events. The social media initiative Share to Aware invited citizens to share campaign visuals across platforms. Other associated activities included Clean Air Plantation Appeal, Spot the Kilvish, and Make the Red Light Blue Light.

== Developments ==
=== 2015 ===
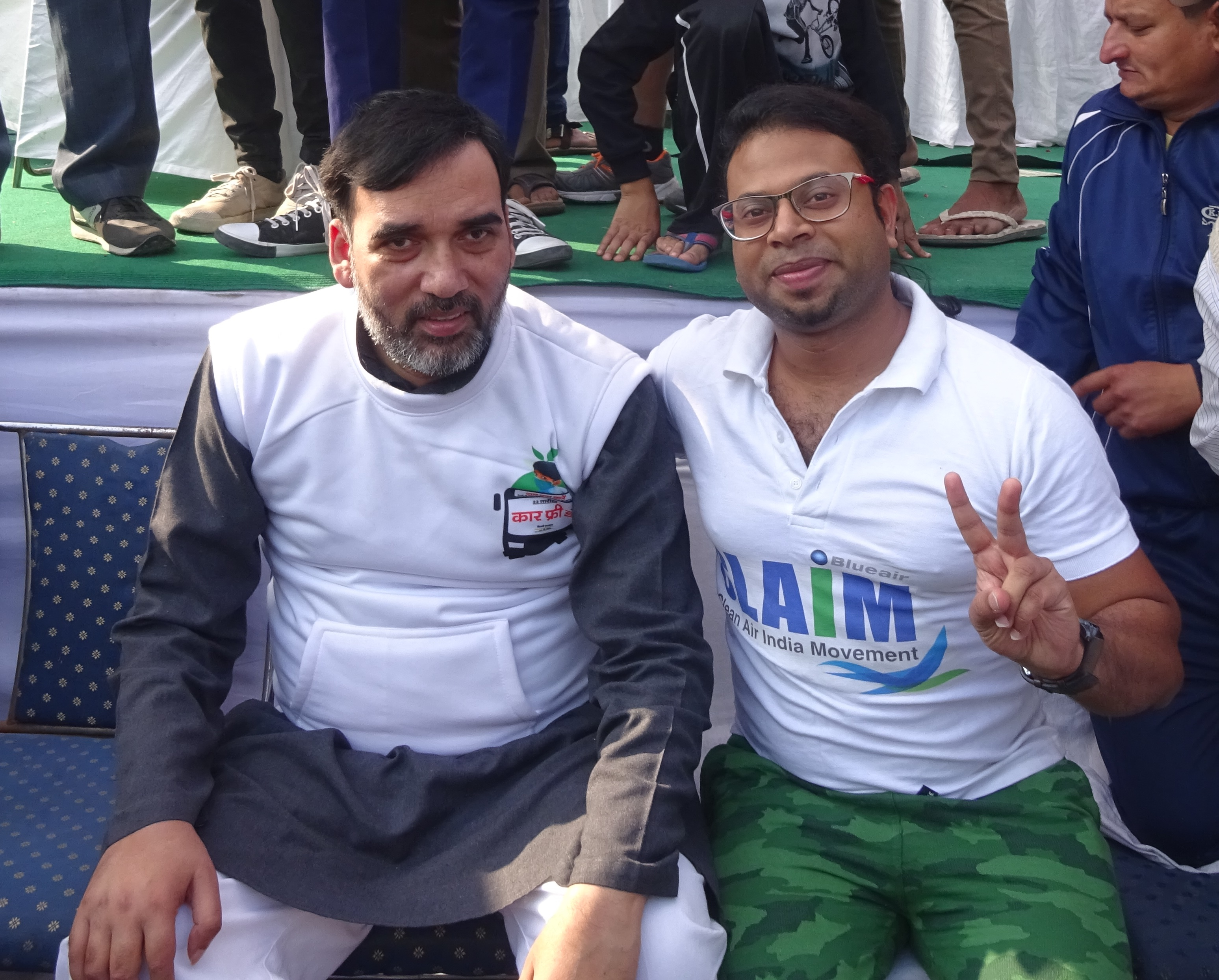
Vijay Kannan (right) with Gopal Rai (left), Transport Minister of Delhi, during Car Free Day, 2015

Following the campaign’s launch, several public initiatives addressing pollution gained traction. The Union Environment Ministry announced plans for stricter emission regulations, and an air-quality index was introduced in 11 major Indian cities. The Government of Delhi imposed restrictions on diesel vehicles over 10 years old and intensified efforts to curb open waste burning.

CLAIM also supported the "Car Free Day" initiative in Dwarka, Delhi, in collaboration with Delhi’s Transport Department and Minister Gopal Rai.

=== 2016 ===
In 2016, CLAIM launched the "See Your Lung" and "Save Your Lungs" campaigns, focusing on the health effects of air pollution. The “See Your Lung” drive promoted the use of carpooling and cycling in Delhi, engaging thousands of participants. The “Save Your Lungs” program was launched in Gurgaon and later extended to Delhi, Mumbai, Bengaluru, and Kolkata.

On World Environment Day, a plantation drive involving over 200 volunteers was organized from India Gate to Guru Harkrishan Public School at Purana Qila Road.

== Awards ==
In 2016, CLAIM received the "Energy and Environment Foundation Global Award" for environmental awareness.

== Gallery ==
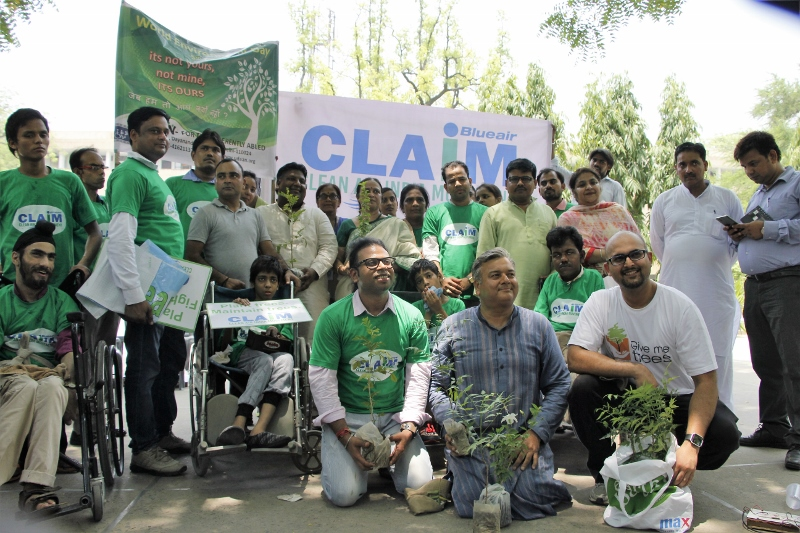
World Environment Day

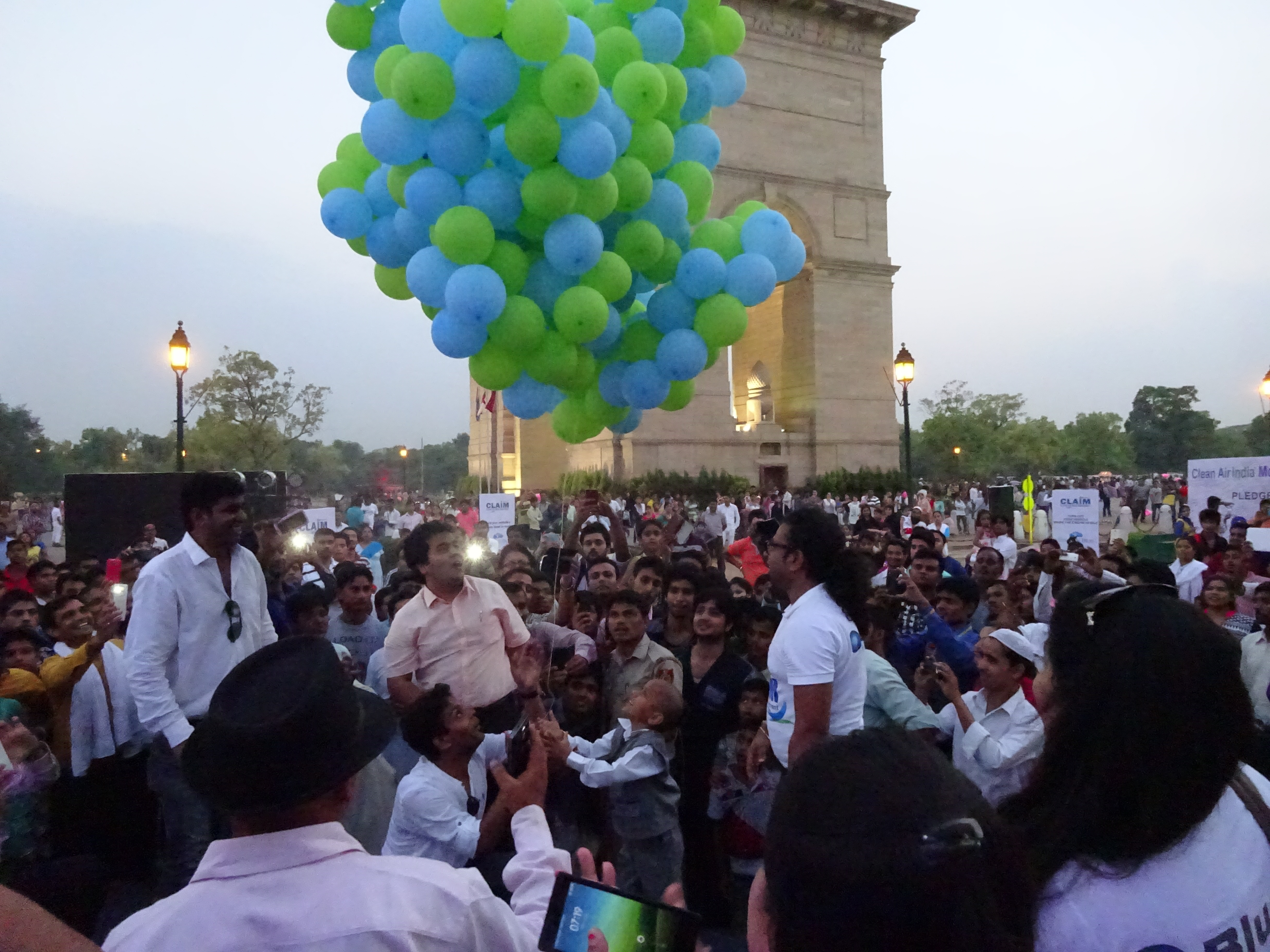
India Gate World Environment Day

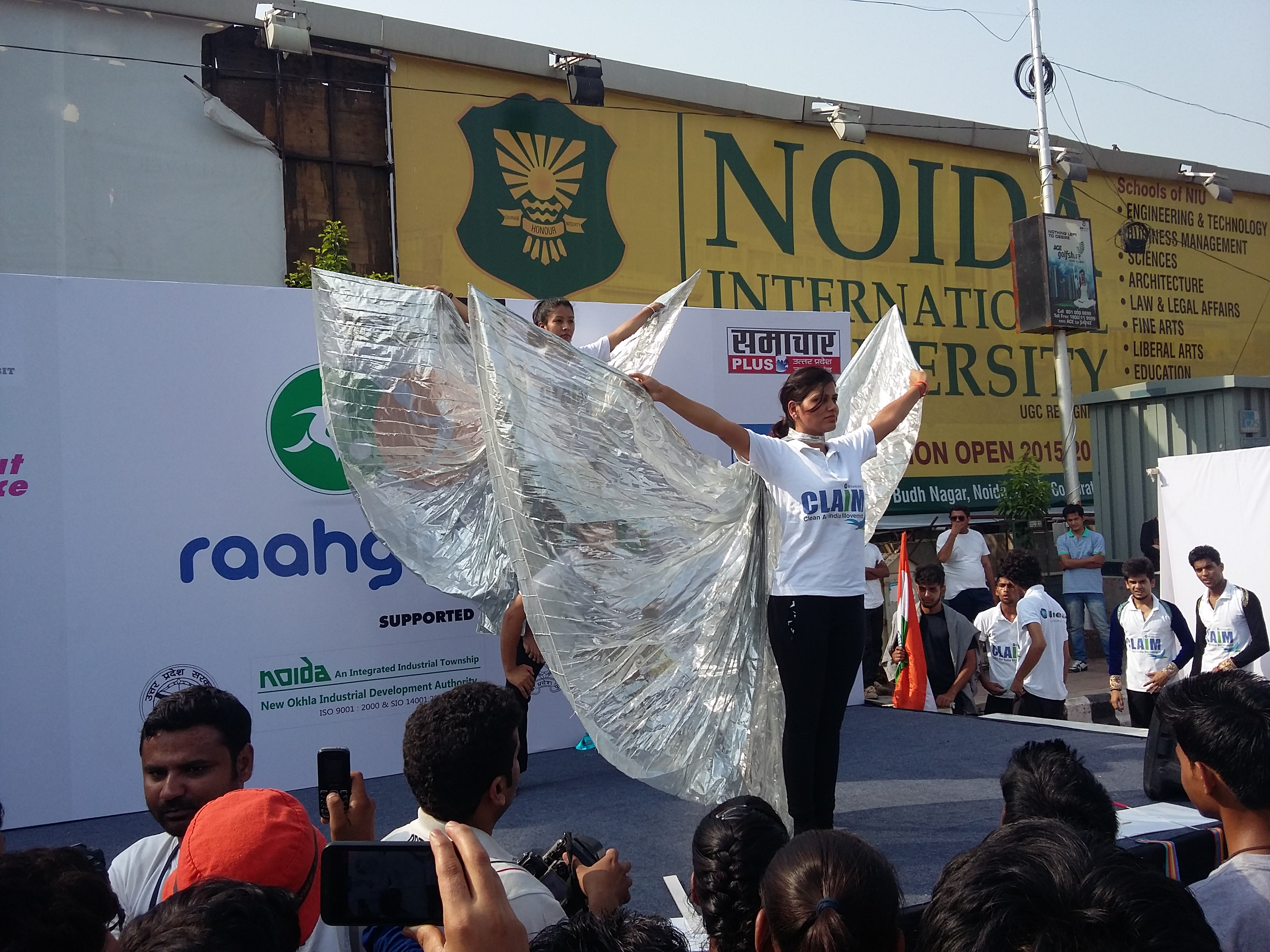
Noida International Yoga Day
