= Airway remodelling =

Asthma complication

Airway remodelling, or airway remodeling, is a potential complication of certain endotypes (subtypes) of asthma. It is the sum of changes that occur in the airways of some asthmatic people compared to people without the disease.

Asthma is characterised, in part, by recurrent episodes of reversible airway obstruction; however, in some patients, a degree of irreversible airway obstruction develops over time, leading to lung function decline and fibrosis. Existing airway remodelling may also contribute to bronchoconstriction in acute asthma exacerbations.

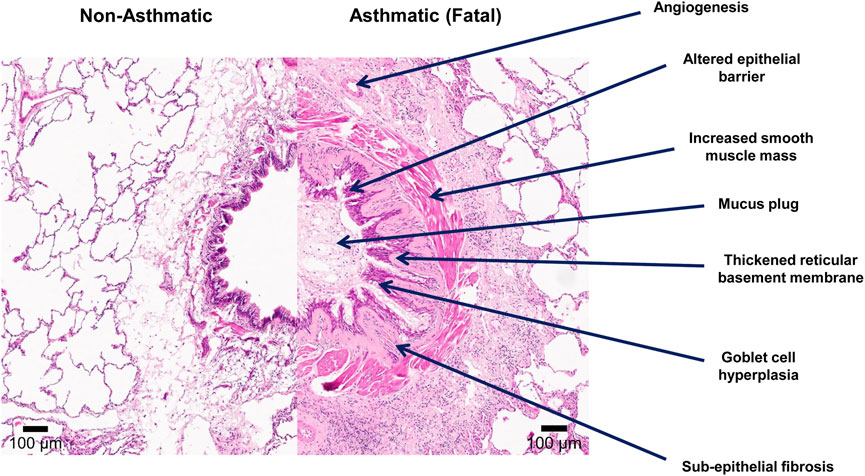
The hallmarks of airway remodelling in asthma as seen on a lung biopsy, comparing a non-asthmatic individual to an asthmatic.

== Hallmarks and mechanisms ==
Airway remodelling is a multifaceted process involving multiple airway tissues. These include goblet cell hyperplasia, leading to increased mucus production, and airway smooth muscle hypertrophy (or smooth muscle cell hyperplasia), leading to the release of pro-inflammatory and pro-fibrotic messengers contributing to subepithelial fibrosis. Subepithelial fibrosis in airway remodelling is also associated with fibroblast-to-myofibroblast transition mediated by transforming growth factor β.

== Onset and progression ==
Airway remodelling is not found at birth, but may be detected as soon as at 2 years of age in some patients.

=== Chronic airway inflammation ===
Airway remodelling had traditionally been considered a consequence of chronic airway inflammation. However, while attenuating chronic airway inflammation using inhaled corticosteroids is effective at preventing asthma exacerbations, it does not seem to impact the progression of airway remodelling. Also, as mentioned, airway remodelling may be seen as soon as at 2 years of age, before any airway inflammation is detectable. Thus, airway remodelling is now considered to occur in conjunction with chronic airway inflammation rather than because of it.

== Prevention and treatment ==
Bronchial thermoplasty is the only treatment modality designed to combat a hallmark of airway remodelling; airway smooth muscle hypertrophy. The effects of bronchial thermoplasty on smooth muscle mass are seen up to at least 12 months post-treatment; however, the procedure does not seem to impact other features of airway remodelling.

Thus far, no pharmacological treatment modality for asthma has been developed nor shown to prevent or attenuate the progression of airway remodelling.

While effective at preventing asthma exacerbations, inhaled corticosteroid or bronchodilator treatment has not been shown to prevent or lessen the development of airway remodelling in longitudinal studies. Inhaled corticosteroids may also partly contribute to airway remodelling by reducing epithelial cell adherence.
