= Bronchial thermoplasty =

- Specialty: Pulmonology

Bronchial thermoplasty is a treatment for severe asthma approved by the FDA in 2010 involving the delivery of controlled, therapeutic radiofrequency energy to the airway wall, thus heating the tissue and reducing the amount of smooth muscle present in the airway wall. This reduces the capacity of the immune system to cause bronchoconstriction through nitric oxide signalling, which is the main root cause of asthma symptoms. Bronchial thermoplasty is normally used to treat patients with severe persistent asthma who do not respond well to typical pharmacotherapy regimens.

== Procedure ==
Animation of bronchial thermoplasty catheter use

A full course of bronchial thermoplasty treatment includes three separate bronchoscopic procedures: one for the each lower lobe of the lung and another for both upper lobes. Each outpatient procedure is performed approximately three weeks apart.

Under sedation, a catheter inside a bronchoscope – a thin, flexible tube-like instrument introduced through the patient’s nose or mouth and into their lungs – delivers thermal energy into the airways. The patient is monitored after the procedure and usually returns home the day of the procedure or early the following day. The catheter delivers a series of 10-second temperature controlled bursts of radio frequency energy which heat the lining of the lungs to 65 degrees Celsius (149 °F). It is this heat that destroys some of the muscle tissue which constricts during an asthma attack, reducing the number and severity of exacerbations.

Through a standard bronchoscopy procedure, a small flexible tube is advanced into the airway, via mouth or nose, to mildly heat the airway walls. This treatment has been shown to result in acute epithelial destruction with regeneration observed in the epithelium, blood vessels, mucosa and nerves; however, airway smooth muscle has demonstrated almost no capacity for regeneration, and it is instead replaced with connective tissue. The treatment has been shown in prospective studies to be safe and effective with duration up to five years. Bronchial thermoplasty is indicated for the treatment of severe persistent asthma in patients 18 years and older whose asthma is not well controlled with inhaled corticosteroids and long acting beta agonists as per guidelines of the Global Initiative for Asthma (GINA).

== Benefits ==
In a double-blind, randomized, sham-controlled clinical study of bronchial thermoplasty, adults with severe asthma treated with bronchial thermoplasty had improved asthma-related quality of life out to a year compared to the control (sham-treated) patients. Additionally, when compared to control patients, patients treated with bronchial thermoplasty also experienced the following benefits, although none reached statistical significance:

- 32% reduction in asthma attacks
- 84% reduction in emergency room visits for respiratory symptoms
- 66% reduction in days lost from work, school, or other daily activities due to asthma symptoms
- 73% reduction in hospitalizations for respiratory symptoms

In a clinical study, bronchial thermoplasty has been proven to provide long-term reduction in asthma induced breathing difficulty to at least 5 years and improve the quality of life for severe persistent asthma patients. Reduction in asthma attacks, ER visits, and hospitalizations for respiratory symptoms are maintained to at least 5 years. These benefits were observed during clinical studies where patients continued to take their standard maintenance asthma medications which included combinations of inhaled corticosteroids and long-acting bronchodilators.

== Risks ==
In the period immediately following the bronchial thermoplasty procedure, there was an expected transient increase in the frequency and worsening of respiratory-related symptoms. Bronchial thermoplasty is not appropriate for patients who:

- Are under 18 years old
- Have a pacemaker, internal defibrillator, or other implantable electronic device
- Have a known sensitivity to medications required to perform bronchoscopy, including lidocaine, atropine and benzodiazepines
- Have previously been treated with bronchial thermoplasty

Bronchial thermoplasty is irreversible; the smooth muscle tissue which is destroyed cannot be recovered.

== Procedure Availability ==
Bronchial thermoplasty was first approved by FDA in April 2010. Bronchial thermoplasty is now being used as a treatment in many countries which include United Kingdom, India, and United States.
