= Lung microbiota =

Community of microorganisms from the lung

The lung microbiota is the pulmonary microbial community consisting of a complex variety of microorganisms found in the lower respiratory tract particularly on the mucous layer and the epithelial surfaces. Although the anatomically lower airway were once thought to be sterile, culture-independent molecular technologies have revealed resident and transient microbial communities even in healthy lungs. In contrast to the gut or upper airway, the lung microbial biomass is very low, and its steady state composition is determined less by stable colonization and more by a balance of microbial immigration (for example via micro-aspiration or inhalation) and clearance (for example via mucociliary transport, immune defenses, and alveolar surfactant). In health, this dynamic ecology supports immune homeostasis and may contribute to disease homeostasis and may contribute to disease resistance. In a disease state, shifts in microbial burden, taxonomic composition, diversity, or translocation of non-typical taxa are increasingly recognized in the pathogenesis and prognosis of respiratory disorders (such as chronic obstructive pulmonary disease, asthma, interstitial lung disease, acute respiratory distress syndrome, and lung cancer). As such, the lung microbiota is emerging as potential biomarker and therapeutic target in pulmonary medicine. These microorganisms include bacteria, fungi, viruses and bacteriophages. The bacterial part of the microbiota has been more closely studied. It consists of a core of nine genera: Prevotella, Sphingomonas, Pseudomonas, Acinetobacter, Fusobacterium, Megasphaera, Veillonella, Staphylococcus, and Streptococcus. They are aerobes as well as anaerobes and aerotolerant bacteria. The microbial communities are highly variable in particular individuals and compose of about 140 distinct families. The bronchial tree for instance contains a mean of 2000 bacterial genomes per cm^{2} surface. The harmful or potentially harmful bacteria are also detected routinely in respiratory specimens. The most significant are Moraxella catarrhalis, Haemophilus influenzae, and Streptococcus pneumoniae. They are known to cause respiratory disorders under particular conditions namely if the human immune system is impaired. The mechanism by which they persist in the lower airways in healthy individuals is unknown.

The fungal genera that are commonly found make up the lung mycobiome, in the microbiota of the lung, and include Candida, Malassezia, Neosartorya, Saccharomyces, and Aspergillus, among others.

== Role of the epithelial barrier ==
The airway epithelium together with alveolar macrophages and dendritic cells play a major role in the initial recognition of bacterial products getting into the lower airways with the air. Since some of these products are potent proinflammatory stimuli it is extremely important for the immune system to distinguish between pathogens and non-pathogenic commensals. This prevents the development of constant inflammation and forms tolerance against harmless microbiota.

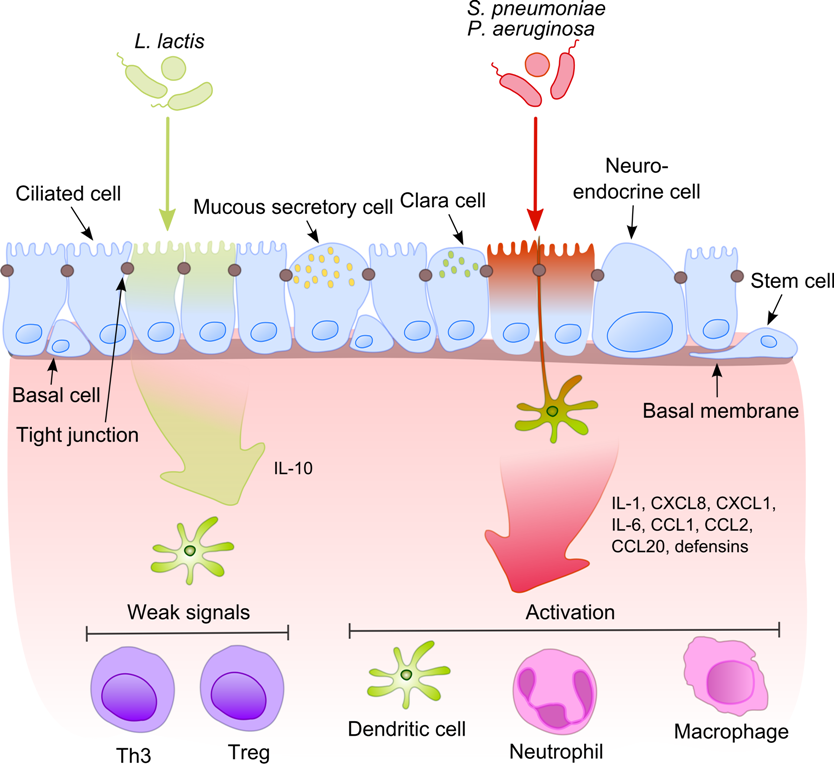
Mechanisms underlying inflammation. The airway epithelium has a complex structure consisting of at least seven diverse cell types interacting with each other by means of tight junctions. Epithelial cells can transmit immunostimulatory signals to underlying tissues taking part in the mechanisms of innate and adaptive immune response. The key transmitters of these signals are dendritic cells. Once pathogenic bacteria (e.g., S. pneumoniae, P. aeruginosa) have activated particular pattern recognition receptors on/in epithelial cells, the proinflammatory signaling pathways are activated. This results mainly in IL-1, IL-6 and IL-8 production. These cytokines induce chemotaxis to the site of infection in its target cells (e.g., neutrophils, dendritic cells and macrophages). On the other hand, representatives of standard microbiota induce only weak signals preventing inflammation. The mechanism of distinguishing between harmless and harmful bacteria on the molecular as well as on physiological levels is not completely understood.

This process becomes much more intriguing when taking into account that commensals often share their surface molecules with pathogens. Epithelial cells are equipped with very sensitive recognition tools – toll like receptors (TLRs), nucleotide-binding oligomerization domain (NOD)-like receptors (NLRs) and retinoic acid-inducible gene (RIG)-I-like receptors (RLRs) which recognize a broad variety of microbial structural components. After recognition of pathogenic bacteria proinflammatory pathways are activated and cellular components of the adaptive and innate immunity are recruited to the infection site. One key regulator in this process is NF-κB which translocates from the cytoplasm into the nucleus and activates pro-inflammatory genes in epithelial cells and macrophages. The DNA-binding protein complex recognizes a discrete nucleotide sequence (5'-GGG ACT TTC T-3') in the upstream region of a variety of response genes. The activation of NF-κB by a number of stimuli: bacterial cell walls or inflammatory cytokines results in its translocation to the nucleus.

In contrast, harmless bacteria do not cause the translocation of NF-κB into the nucleus thus preventing the inflammation although they can express the same microbe-associated molecular patterns (MAMPs). One possible mechanism explaining this effect was suggested by Neish showing that non-pathogenic S. typhimurium PhoPc and S. pullorum are able to prohibit the ubiquitination of NF-κB inhibitor molecule nuclear factor of NF-κB light polypeptide gene enhancer in B-cells inhibitor alpha (IκB-κ). Another explanation of commensal tolerance of the epithelium refers to the post-translational modification of a protein by the covalent attachment of one or more ubiquitin (Ub) monomers. The inhibition of ubiquitination leads to reduction of inflammation, because only polyubiquitinated (IκB-κ is targeted for degradation by the 26 S proteasome, allowing NF-κB translocation to the nucleus and activation the transcription of effector genes (for example IL-8). Probiotic bacteria such as Lactobacilli are able to modulate the activity of the Ub-proteasome system via inducing reactive oxygen species (ROS) production in epithelial cells. In mammalian cells, ROS have been shown to serve as critical second messengers in multiple signal transduction pathways in response to proinflammatory cytokines. Bacterially induced ROS causes oxidative inactivation of the catalytic cysteine residue of Ub 12 resulting in incomplete but transient loss of cullin-1 neddylation and consequent effects on NF-κB and β-catenin signaling. Another commensal species, B. thetaiotaomicron, attenuates pro-inflammatory cytokine expression by promoting nuclear export of NF-κB subunit RelA, through a peroxisome proliferator activated receptor γ (PPAR-γ)-dependent pathway. PPAR-γ target transcriptionally active Rel A and induce early nuclear clearance limiting the duration of NF-κB action.

The balance between pathogens and commensals is extremely important in the maintenance of homeostasis in the respiratory tract.

== Physiology ==
The airways are continually exposed to a multitude of microorganisms, some of which are able to persist and even colonize respiratory tract. This is possible due to the presence of nutrients, oxygen, and optimal growth temperature. There are several host-derived nutrient sources for microbial residents: secretions from airway epithelial cells (especially goblet cells), secretions from submucosal glands and transudate from plasma. Moreover, the pool of available nutrients is increased by the activities of some members of the microbiota. Macromolecular components of respiratory secretions (proteins, glycoproteins, lipids, nucleic acids) are converted to nutrients (e.g. carbohydrates, amino acids). Thus, the metabolic activity of present bacteria allow for the colonization of new species. The commensal bacteria are nonpathogenic and defend our airways against the pathogens. There are several possible mechanisms. Commensals are the native competitors of pathogenic bacteria, because they tend to occupy the same ecological niche inside the human body. Secondly, they are able to produce antibacterial substances called bacteriocins which inhibit the growth of pathogens.

In a healthy lung, the microbial community is shaped mostly by three ecological processes: (1) immigration of microbes (via inhalation of ambient air, micro-aspiration of oropharyngeal secretions, mucosal dispersion), (2) elimination or clearance of microbes (via mucociliary transport, coughing, phagocytosis by alveolar macrophages, alveolar surfactant antimicrobial activity, and (3) low level in situ growth of microbes in the lung microenvironment. Current evidence suggests that in healthy individuals, immigration and clearance dominate, and that net growth is minimal.

While studies remain limited, typical bacterial genera detected in healthy lower airway samples include Prevotella, Veillonella, Streptococcus, Granulicatella, and Fusobacterium. These genera are frequently drawn from the oropharynx, indicating the lung microbiota is in part a subset of upper respiratory tract communities. However, the relative abundance in the lung is lower and the community composition is less dominated by any single taxon.

Genera Bacillus, Lactobacillus, Lactococcus, Staphylococcus, Streptococcus, and Streptomyces are the main producers of bacteriocins in respiratory tract. Moreover, commensals are known to induce Th1 response and anti-inflammatory interleukin (IL)-10, antimicrobial peptides, FOXP3, secretory immunoglobulin A (sIgA) production.

Unlike the gut microbiota which is dense, highly diverse, and relatively stable, the lung microbiota is sparse (less than 10^3-10^5 bacterial cells/g of tissue in some estimates) and highly dynamic. The selective pressures of the lung environment (such as oxygen tension, surfactant, alveolar macrophages, etc.) limit large microbial populations and favor transient, low biomass communities.

Even though the lung microbial burden is low, evidence suggests these microbes, or their products, may modulate host immune states. For example, commensal organisms may influence alveolar macrophages activation, maintain epithelial barrier integrity and contribute to immune homeostasis. Animal studies have suggested that absence of a normal pulmonary microbial community leads to exaggerated inflammatory responses, increased susceptibility to infection and less mature alveolar development.

The lung microbial community in healthy individuals is influenced by multiple factors including environmental exposures (such as air pollution, inhaled particulates, etc.), smoking status, airway anatomy (such as clearance mechanisms and prior injury), host immune function, and the rate of micro-aspiration from the oropharynx or gut. Sampling method (bronchoalveolar lavage vs protected brush vs tissue biopsy) also strongly influences detected composition and must be considered in interpretation.

== Clinical significance ==
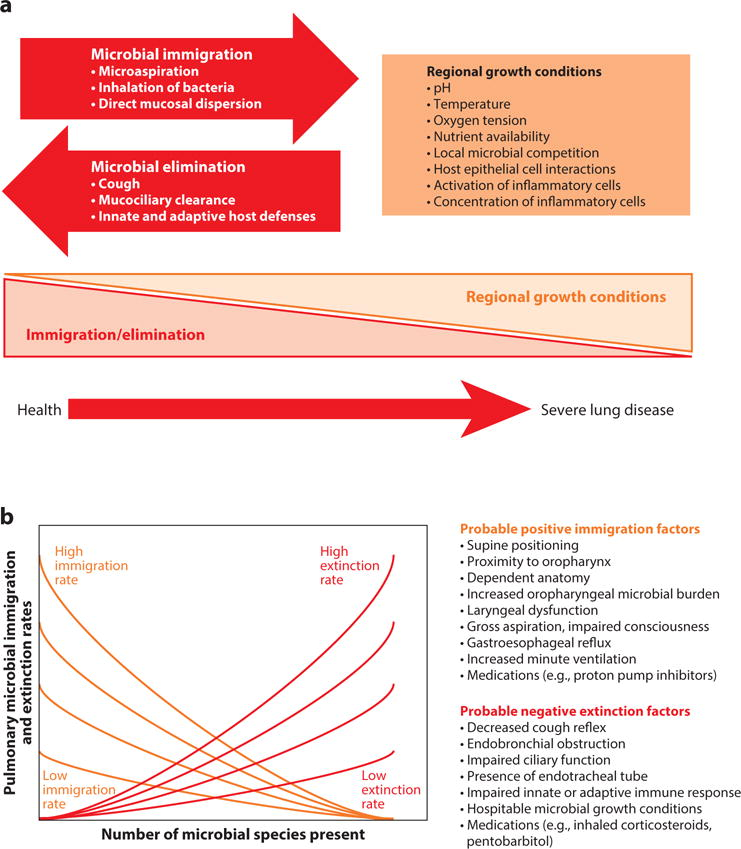
Ecological modeling of the respiratory microbiome

Changes in microbial community composition seem to play a role in progression of such pulmonary disorders as chronic obstructive pulmonary disease (COPD), asthma, and cystic fibrosis. In humans, S. aureus is part of the normal microbiota present in the upper respiratory tract, and on skin and in the gut mucosa. S. aureus, along with similar species that can colonize and act symbiotically but can cause disease if they begin to take over the tissues they have colonized or invade other tissues, have been called "pathobionts". MRSA can similarly colonize people without making them sick. The presence of such genera as Mycoplasma, Pseudomonas, and Staphylococcus is correlated with stable COPD state. On the other hand, Prevotella, Mesorhizobium, Microbacterium, Micrococcus, Veillonela, Rhizobium, Stenotrophomonas, and Lactococcus present mostly in healthy individual cohort. The relative abundance of Proteobacteria is increased in asthmatic children. Pseudomonas aeruginosa, Staphylococcus aureus, and Burkholderia cepacia are found most often in cystic fibrosis patients.

In conditions (such as chronic obstructive pulmonary disease (COPD) and asthma), studies have consistently shown shifts in lung microbial composition and diversity: for example, increased burden of Proteobacteria, reduced diversity, and enrichment of genera associated with the upper airway or gut have been described. These changes correlate with exacerbation risk, airway inflammation, and lung function decline.

In acute respiratory failure, ventilator associated pneumonia, and acute respiratory distress syndrome (ARDS), the lung microbiota often display increased bacterial burden and enrichment of microbial taxa that are associated with the gut like Enterobacteriaceae, which is likely reflecting translocation, airway injury, and impaired clearance. In one ICU study, higher lung bacterial DNA burden was independently associated with fewer ventilator free days.

Altered lung microbial ecology may influence disease via several mechanism: (1) increased microbial burden or inappropriate taxa may drive local inflammation, epithelial injury, or airway remodeling, (2) impaired clearance and micro-aspiration may favor persistent microbial stimulation, (3) gut-lung axis interactions allow gut microbes and metabolites to modulate pulmonary immunity, and (4) disease induced changes in lung structure (fibrosis, altered mucociliary clearance, airway obstruction, etc.) may promote microbial overgrowth or altered ecology, thus creating a bi-directional loop of dysbiosis and lung injury.

High-throughput sequencing and the whole genome sequencing approaches will provide the further information about the complexity and physiological implication of commensal bacteria in the lower respiratory tract.

The lung microbiota offers many implications for diagnostics and therapy as a potential biomarker and as a potential therapeutic target. Its implication as a biomarker is based on it being used to use changes microbial burden or taxonomic shifts to predict disease progression or therapy response. As a therapeutic target, it could be used by modulating airway microbial ecology, reducing pathogenic overgrowth, and enhancing clearance. However, interventional data remains limited and further mechanistic and longitudinal studies are needed before widespread clinical use.

== See also ==
- Human microbiome
- List of human flora
- Bacteriocin
