= World Asthma Day =

Health awareness day

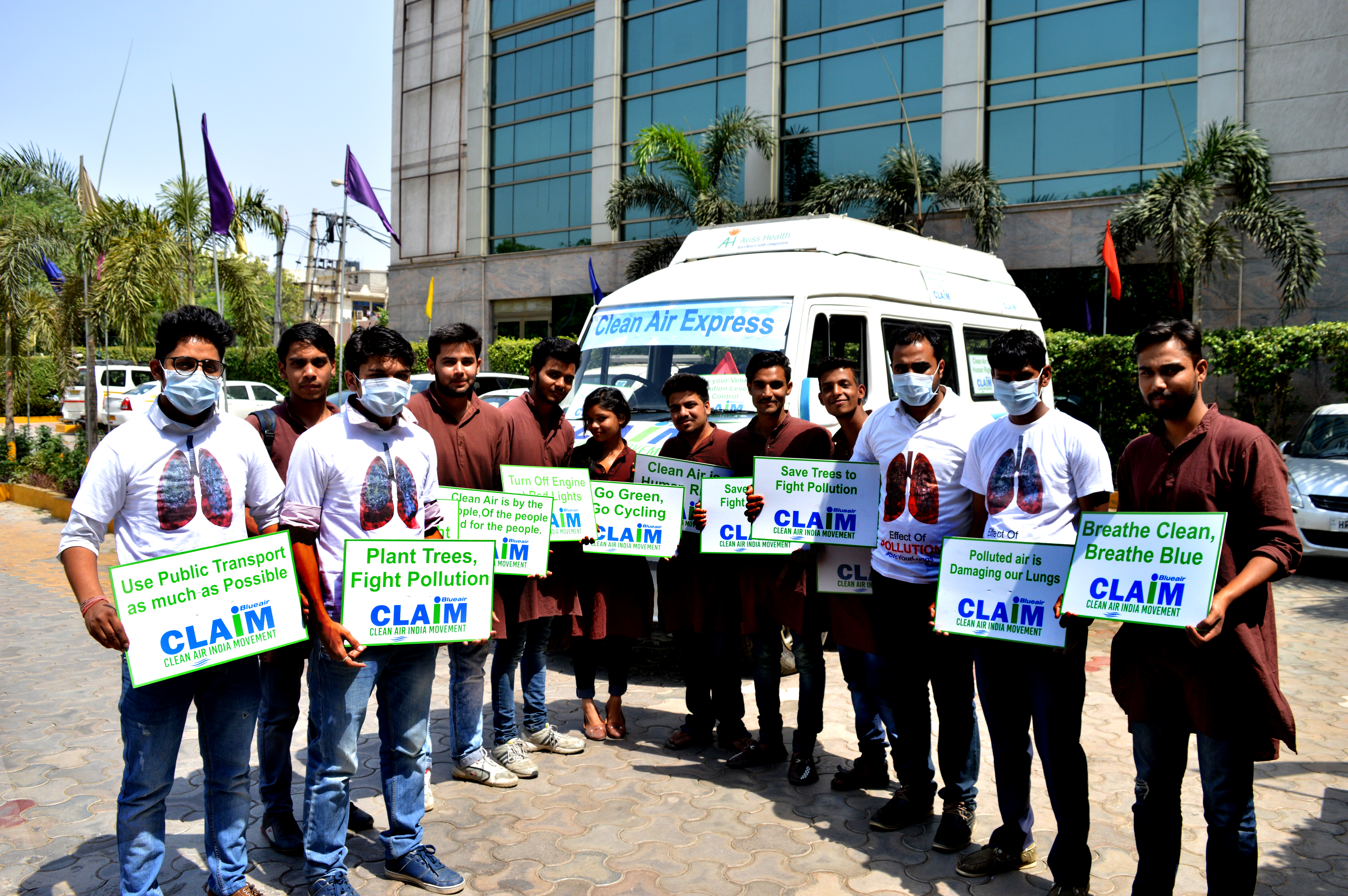
- Clean Air India Movement at the launch of Clean Air Express Bus on eve of World Asthma Day on 3 May 2016
- Type: 6
- Date: first Tuesday in May
- Frequency: annual

World Asthma Day is an annual event organized by the Global Initiative for Asthma (GINA) to improve asthma awareness and care around the world. World Asthma Day is held on the first Tuesday in May. The theme of 2021's event was "Uncovering Asthma Misconceptions," and for 2022, "Closing Gaps in Asthma Care."

The inaugural World Asthma Day was held in 1998.
