= Component causes =

Event contributing to disease development

A component cause is an event or condition that contributes to the development of a disease, but is not sufficient on its own to cause the disease. Instead, it is part of a larger set of conditions, known as a "sufficient cause," that together result in the disease.

== Definition ==
A component cause is a factor that, along with other component causes, forms a sufficient cause for a disease. A sufficient cause is a complete combination of component causes necessary for the disease to manifest. Diseases result from a chain of causally related events, starting from an initial event to the clinical appearance of the disease. No single antecedent event is sufficient on its own to cause the disease; each event is a part of the sufficient cause, making it a component cause.

== Theoretical Framework ==
The concept of component causes is part of the broader causal pie model proposed by epidemiologist Kenneth Rothman. In this model, each disease is the result of multiple causal pies, each representing a combination of component causes. A single factor can be a component cause in multiple sufficient causes for different diseases.

== Importance in Epidemiology ==
Understanding component causes is crucial for identifying intervention points to prevent disease. By recognizing and mitigating key component causes, public health initiatives can reduce the incidence of disease.

== Examples ==
Consider lung cancer as an example. Smoking is a major component cause of lung cancer, but not everyone who smokes develops lung cancer. Other component causes might include genetic predisposition, other environmental factors, etc. Only when all necessary component causes are present does the sufficient cause of lung cancer come into play.

== See also ==
- Sufficient cause of the disease.
- Causes of lung cancer
- Causality
