= Global Initiative for Asthma =

International medical guidelines organisation

The Global Initiative for Asthma (GINA) is a medical guidelines organisation which works with public health officials and health care professionals globally to reduce asthma prevalence, morbidity, and mortality. GINA was launched in 1993 as a collaboration between National Heart, Lung, and Blood Institute, National Institutes of Health, and the World Health Organization.

== Work ==
GINA conducts continuous review of scientific publications on asthma and is a leader in disseminating information about the care of patients with asthma. GINA publishes resources such as evidence-based guidelines for asthma management, and runs special events such as World Asthma Day. GINA's guidelines, revised each year, are used by clinicians worldwide.
