= Lise Eliot =

American neuroscienctist

- Education: Harvard University; Columbia University
- Scientific career
- Workplaces: Rosalind Franklin University of Medicine and Science
- Website: liseeliot.com

Lise Eliot is Professor of Neuroscience at the Chicago Medical School at Rosalind Franklin University of Medicine and Science. She is best known for her book, on the gender differences between boys and girls, Pink Brain, Blue Brain: How Small Differences Grow into Troublesome Gaps and What We Can Do About It (Houghton Mifflin Harcourt 2009).

She also writes for Slate Magazine, and is the author of What's Going on in There? How the Brain and Mind Develop in the First Five Years of Life (Bantam, 2000).

== Publications ==
- Eliot, Lise (2011). "The Trouble with Sex Differences". Neuron. 72 (6): 895–898. doi:10.1016/j.neuron.2011.12.001. PMID 22196326.

== See also ==
- Gendered associations of pink and blue
- Gender polarization
- Gender stereotyping
