= History of Amazonas =

Historical aspects of Amazonas, Brazil

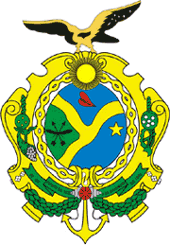
Coat of arms of the state of Amazonas.

The history of Amazonas is the result of treaties, religious missions and a few indigenous rebellions in the Amazon territory. Initially, under the Treaty of Tordesillas, the site belonged to the Spanish Kingdom, but was later annexed by the Portuguese Crown. The state's international borders, undefined after Brazil's independence in 1822, were demarcated during the signing of the Treaty of Bogotá. Archaeological research suggests past occupations by Paleo-Indian hunter-gatherer groups, dated around 11,200 years before the present day.

The period of greatest human development in the lowlands of the Amazon is known as the late pre-Columbian, which coincides with the European invasion in the 16th and 17th centuries and the socio-political dismantling of complex societies that occupied the channel of the Amazon river and inland. The territory was once part of a Portuguese administrative unit called the State of Grão-Pará and Maranhão, whose capital was initially São Luiz do Maranhão, but was transferred to the city of Santa Maria de Belém do Grão-Pará (now Belém), becoming the State of Grão-Pará and Rio Negro after the administrative foundation of the Captaincy of São José do Rio Negro, based in Barcelos. Between the mid-18th and 19th centuries, Barra do Rio Negro (now Manaus) was elevated to the category of village and became the administrative capital of the Captaincy of Rio Negro.

After the dismemberment of the Province of Grão-Pará, the state was designated São José da Barra do Rio Negro on September 5, 1850. The new province was named Amazonas by Dom Pedro II in reference to the river of the same name, which was called so by the Spanish in the expeditionary historical accounts of Friars Gaspar de Carvajal and Francisco de Orellana. When Orellana traveled down the present-day Amazon river in search of gold and spices in 1541, heading for the Atlantic Ocean, the stream was called Grande, Mar Dulce or even Río de la Canela, because of the large cinnamon trees found there.

However, the main name given to the river was Rio de las Amazonas, due to the supposed victorious resistance of warrior natives against the invaders, reported by the Spanish expeditionaries. The information was so relevant that the Hispanic crown became aware of it through stories that referred to the river as the Amazon in reference to the myth of the Amazons in Greek mythology. The expeditionary Orellana was given the right to explore the new lands, a fact that was not realized due to his disappearance at the mouth of the river.

== Amazonian prehistory ==
Amazonian prehistory is usually divided into three phases: Paleoindigenous, Archaic and Late Prehistoric. According to food remains found in the Pedra Pintada cave in Monte Alegre, in western Pará, the Paleoindian phase is expected to have lived around 9,200 years ago. It is also believed that the Paleoindigenous groups of the Amazon, like those of South America, were different from the Paleo-Indians of North America. The Archaic phase would have taken place between 6,000 years ago and 1,000 years ago and the Late Prehistoric phase developed possibly between 1,000 years BC and 1,000 years AD.

=== Paleoindigenous and Archaic Phases ===
The population of the Paleoindian culture was small, dispersed, nomadic and organized their societies in small bands. South American groups focused on hunting small animals and gathering molluscs and plants. The Amazonian Paleo-Indian phase, which emerged around 9,200 B.C., had similarities to the others; it was based on fruit gathering, hunting and fishing, and later developed a culture of exploiting fish and gathering molluscs. In the Pedra Pintada cave, food remains and spearheads were found, suggesting their use in hunting large animals, especially large fish. However, they are not considered an indication of specialization in this type of activity, only in general hunting and gathering.

The Archaic phase was more diverse than the Paleoindigenous. The inhabitants of the Archaic period used new food resources, exploring regions such as steppes, lakes and coastlines. Hunting was not specialized in large animals and there was an increase in plant gathering and animal domestication. In the region of the present-day states of Amazonas and Pará, ceramics began to be made along the Amazon river around 6,000 BC. This cultural trend was accentuated between 2,000 years and 1,000 years B.C. with a high production of incised decorative ceramics, some of which featured geometric paintings in red and white. Also during this period, the formation of root vegetable growers began, mainly manioc.

The main materials made during the Archaic phase were chipped stone tools and reddish ceramics shaped like open gourds.

=== Late Prehistoric Phase ===
The Late Prehistoric period takes place between 1,000 BC and 1,000 AD and is characterized by the emergence of indigenous societies with a high degree of economic, demographic, political, social development and cultural domains. The Amazon was a favorable environment for the development of these prehistoric societies, since they flourished on the banks of large rivers, which were numerous in the region. According to archaeological and ethno-historical data, the Amazon and Orinoco rivers were the main places where these organizations settled in South America and Central America.

The Amazon witnessed the development of the tesos builders, artificial flood embankments on which villages were built. This culture was soon succeeded by hierarchical and complex societies, which emerged mainly in the Marajó Island region, and in a zone between Santarém, in Pará, and Urucurituba, in Amazonas. These organizations produced refined ceramics, known today as Marajoara ceramics or Tapajonic ceramics.

The Amazon served as a home and support for these societies for around 2,000 years, but there was a regression with the arrival of the Europeans. In the 16th and 17th centuries, the original population of Amazonia experienced a massive population collapse due to Old World diseases. Many of the local inhabitants retreated into the forests, where they formed different tribal organizations. Wars of conquest by the Spanish and Portuguese also led to the enslavement of many native inhabitants.

However, the current indigenous societies of the Amazon do not have any traits reminiscent of complex communities from the Late Prehistoric period, with the exception of a few material traces.

== First explorations ==
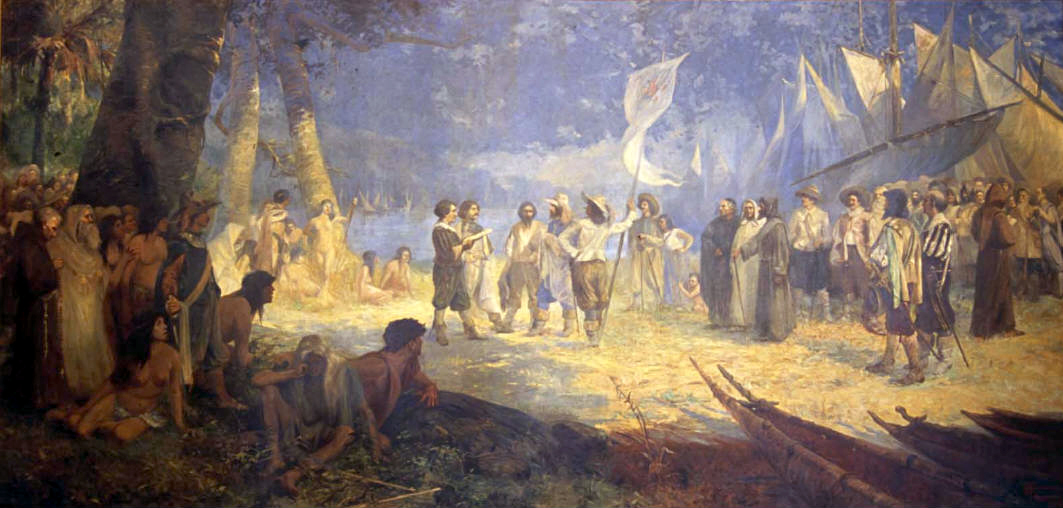
The conquest of Amazonas, 1907, Historical Museum of the State of Pará.

Originally, in accordance with the terms of the Treaty of Tordesillas, the area of what is now Amazonas was not part of Portuguese lands, but remained under Spanish control. The first European to travel the entire length of the Amazon river was the Spaniard Francisco de Orellana, between 1539 and 1541, from the Andes to the Atlantic Ocean. At the time, the story spread that the mythical city of El Dorado would be located somewhere between the Amazon and the Guianas.

Orellana claimed to have encountered and fought a tribe of warrior women, which is why he named the course "the river of the Amazons", in reference to the characters from Greek mythology. One of Orellana's companions, Gonzalo Fernández de Oviedo y Valdés, published reports of the expedition describing the riches and inhabitants of the region, which were released in Venice in 1556. A new expedition in 1561 tried to repeat Orellana's achievement, but almost didn't succeed: the commander, Pedro de Ursua, was murdered by his successor, Lope de Aguirre, who went mad from tropical delirium. Cruel in every respect, Aguirre also killed his fifteen-year-old daughter and several natives.

The occupation of the mouth of the Amazon river (present-day states of Amapá and Pará), due to its economic exploitation, was carried out by the English and Dutch, who set up factories on the banks of the region's largest rivers to extract wood and spices such as cloves, annatto, guaraná, resins and others (the so-called drogas do sertão) from 1596. Early on, the economy of the Amazon region was based on extractivism and not on sugar agro-manufacturing, as in other colonial regions.

== Philippine Dynasty ==
With the Philippine Dynasty in 1580, the Tordesillas line lost its practical effect. At the same time, Spain's enemies felt free to make incursions into Portuguese overseas domains.

In 1612, King James I of England commissioned Robert Harcourt to explore the region. In the same year, the French founded Equinoctial France on the island of São Luís, off the coast of Maranhão, which was conquered at the end of 1615 by Portuguese-Spanish troops. After this conquest, Francisco Caldeira Castelo Branco was designated to move towards the mouth of the Amazon river, founding the Presépio Fort in December of that same year, nucleus of the present-day city of Belém. The territory was incorporated into the state of Maranhão, created in 1621 by Philip III of Spain.

Between 1637 and 1639, an expedition led by Pedro Teixeira traveled up and down the course of the Amazon river, reaching Quito, in Ecuador, and founding the present-day town of Franciscana, already in Peruvian territory. With the Portuguese Restoration in 1640, the state of Maranhão returned to the sovereignty of Portugal. At that time, the Portuguese were already promoting regular expeditions in the Amazon and the lower Madeira river.

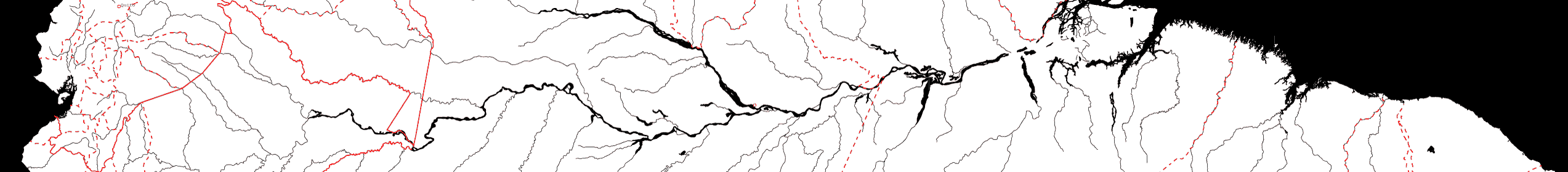
The expeditions of Orellana and Pedro Teixeira traveled the entire length of the Amazon river, from its mouth (on the right) to the Ecuador (on the left).

== Bandeirantes ==
Between 1648 and 1652, Antônio Raposo Tavares, a bandeirante from São Paulo, set off on his journey up the Paraguay river basin, reached Guaporé (now Rondônia), crossed the Altiplano, and traveled down the Amazon river to Gurupá, in Pará, near its mouth. It was the first Luso-Brazilian expedition of extensive reconnaissance.

== Portuguese occupation ==
In 1669, in the area where Manaus is today, the Fort of São José da Barra do Rio Negro was founded by the Portuguese captain Francisco da Mota Falcão. The fortification served as a base for the settlement of the Amazonas, allowing the navigation up the Negro and Branco rivers, in present-day Roraima, from where the Orinoco was reached. The first settlers faced hostility from the natives, such as the tribes of the Manaós, led by the cacique Ajuricaba, and the Torás, who attacked the settlements and destroyed houses and facilities.

In order to catechize and pacify the natives, the Jesuits (mostly Spanish) built colonies, mainly in the Solimões and Juruá basins, led by Father Samuel Fritz. However, missionary activity was seen as a foreign occupation and the Portuguese Crown ordered the expulsion of the Jesuits from the region. The military campaigns against the colonies took place between 1691 and 1697 under the command of Inácio Correia de Oliveira, Antônio de Miranda and José Antunes da Fonseca on the Solimões and Francisco de Melo Palheta on the Madeira. The Spanish missionaries were replaced by Portuguese missionaries, mainly Carmelites and Mercedarians. The settlements that would give rise to today's Barcelos (then called Mariuá), Tefé, São Paulo de Olivença, Coari, Borba and Airão were created at this time.

The French and Spanish returned to raid the region, but the Portuguese decided to close the Madeira river to foreign navigation in 1732. However, the bandeirantes José Leme do Prado and Manuel Félix de Lima explored the area, descending as far as Cuiabá in Mato Grosso, and creating an Amazonian trade hub between Cuiabá, Manaus and Belém. Portuguese fortifications were erected in Tabatinga, São Gabriel da Cachoeira, Maribatanas and São Joaquim, leading to new settlements.

== Captaincy of São José do Rio Negro ==
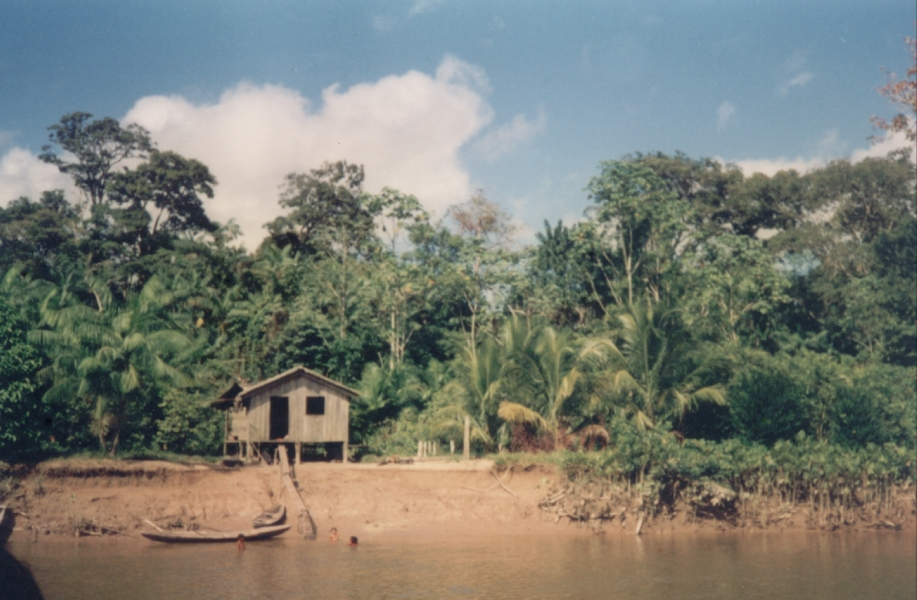
The occupation of the Amazon took place in sparse settlements due to the dense forest.

The state of Maranhão became Grão-Pará e Maranhão in 1737 and its headquarters were transferred from São Luís to Belém. The Treaty of Madrid of 1750 confirmed Portuguese possession of the area. In order to study and demarcate the boundaries, the governor of the state, Francisco Xavier de Mendonça Furtado, set up a commission based in Mariuá in 1754. In 1755, the Captaincy of São José do Rio Negro was created in present-day Amazonas, subordinate to Grão-Pará. The territory included Roraima, part of Acre and part of what is now Mato Grosso. The colonial government granted privileges and freedoms to anyone willing to emigrate to the region, such as tax exemption for 16 years in a row. In the same year, the Companhia Geral do Comércio do Grão-Pará e Maranhão was created to stimulate the local economy. In 1757, the first governor of the captaincy, Joaquim de Mello e Póvoas, took office and was ordered by the Marquis of Pombal to forcibly expel all the Jesuits, who were accused of turning the natives against the metropolis and not teaching them the Portuguese language.

In 1772, the captaincy was renamed Grão-Pará and Rio Negro and Maranhão was dismembered. When the Royal Family moved to Brazil, manufacturers were allowed to set up shop and Amazonas began to produce cotton, cordage, ceramics and candles. In 1821, Grão Pará and Rio Negro became the unified Province of Grão-Pará. The following year, Brazil proclaimed its independence.

In the mid-19th century, the first settlements were founded, originating the current cities of Itacoatiara, Parintins, Manacapuru and Careiro. The capital was located in Mariuá (between 1755-1791 and 1799–1808), and in São José da Barra do Rio Negro (1791-1799 and 1808–1821). In 1832, the so-called Lages Revolt demanded the autonomy of Amazonas as a separate province from Pará. The rebellion was suppressed, but the people from Amazonas managed to send a representative to the Imperial Court, Friar José dos Santos Innocentes, who achieved the creation of the Comarca do Alto Amazonas. During the Cabanagem, between 1835 and 1840, Amazonas remained loyal to the imperial government and did not join the revolt. As a kind of reward, Amazonas definitively separated from Pará and became an autonomous province in 1850, with Manaus as its capital in 1856.

== Autonomy and the rubber cycle ==
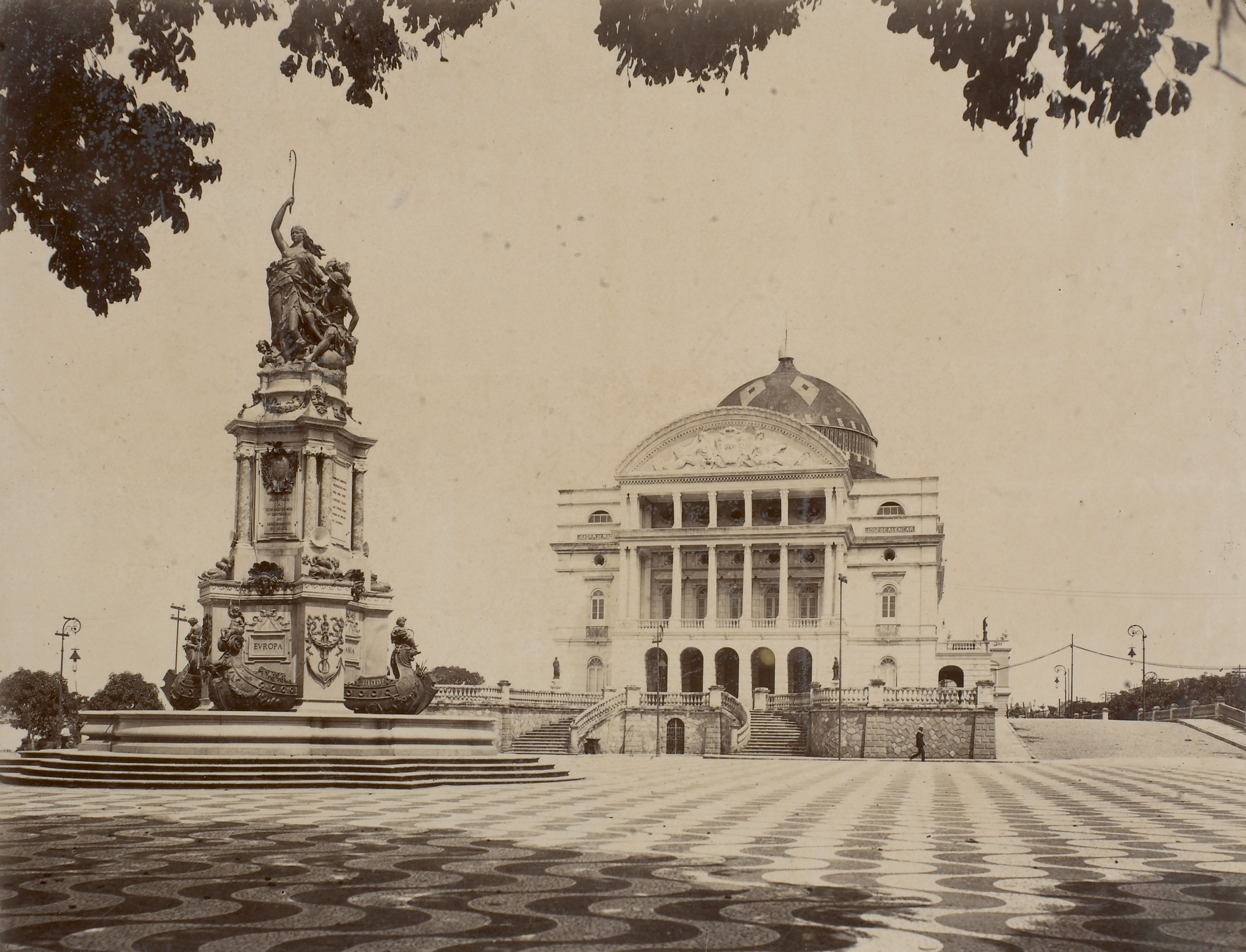
São Sebastião Square and Amazon Theater, Manaus, 1906.

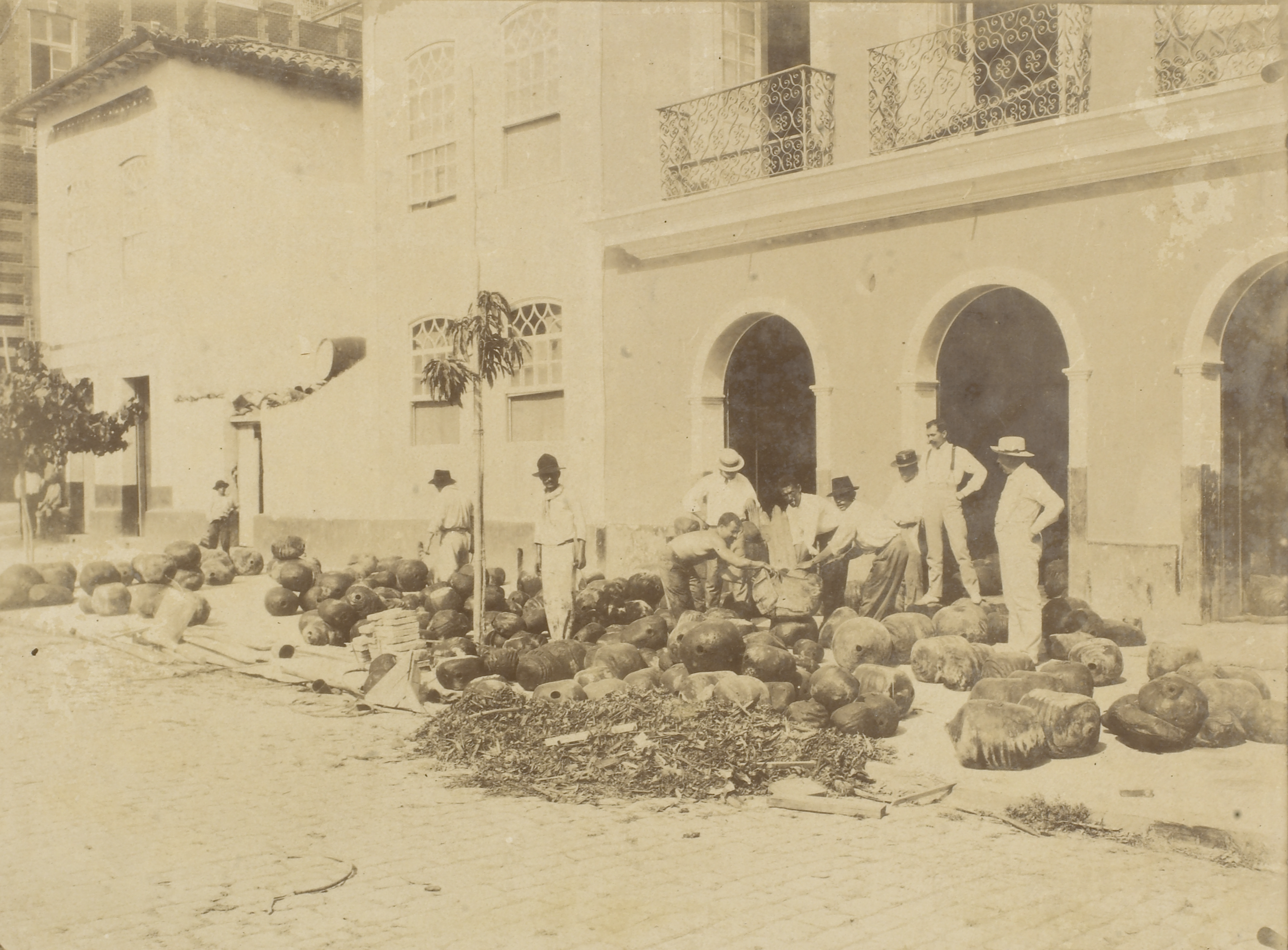
Rubber processing, Manaus, 1906.

The first president of the new province was Tenreiro Aranha. In order to deal with the financial difficulties of the administration, he managed to get the government to redirect part of the funds from Pará and Maranhão for a few years, in order to supplement the Amazonas budget. With this money, Aranha founded a printing press and circulated the first newspaper in the state, Cinco de Setembro. Progress introduced river trade.

The collectors of drogas do sertão expanded to the Juruá, Purus and Juari rivers, paving the way for the installation of latex extraction stations. This new activity sustained the economy of Amazonas from the 1850s onwards. In 1853, the Companhia de Navegação e Comércio da Amazônia was founded, with investment from the Baron of Mauá. In 1866, the Amazon river was opened to international navigation and foreign companies, mainly British, began to invest in the region. The profitability of rubber created fortunes, financed the growth of Manaus and attracted immigrants. The province began to receive immigrants from various parts of Brazil (mainly northeasterners, fleeing the drought of 1872) and also from neighboring countries such as Bolivia and Peru. The population spread further and further west, leading to the settlement of Acre, already in Bolivian territory, which caused the conflict that led to the Acrean Revolution. At its peak, almost 100% of the world's rubber production came from the Amazon.

The capital, Manaus, was expanded and urbanized in order to acquire the appearance of a European metropolis. Streams were filled in and wide avenues and boulevards opened up. The construction of the Amazon Theater, the Rio Negro Palace, the Port Customs House and the Adolpho Lisboa Municipal Market, among other exemplary buildings, date back to this period. The population of Amazonas increased fivefold between 1870 and 1900, from 50,000 to 250,000.

The rubber cycle also stimulated scientific expeditions to catalog the biodiversity of the Amazon. In 1883, Professor Barbosa Rodrigues founded the Botanical Museum of Manaus. Brazilian and foreign scientists such as Carl von Martius, William Chandless, Henry Walter Bates and Louis Agassiz explored the forest, almost always guided by the caboclo Manuel Urbano da Encarnação.

The Province of Amazonas anticipated the abolition by four years, decreeing the end of slavery on July 10, 1884. When the Republic was proclaimed on November 15, 1889, the province became a state and Lieutenant Ximeno Villerroy was appointed as the federal government's interventor. Politics suffered successive crises, with disputes sponsored by rubber entrepreneurs such as local caudillos Eduardo Ribeiro and Guerreiro Antoni. In 1910, during the Bombardment of Manaus, Governor Antônio Clemente Ribeiro Bittencourt was deposed and then reinstated.

The rubber cycle lasted until 1913, when the price of the product on the international market fell sharply due to competition from Malaysia, where rubber tree seeds had been smuggled in years before. The Hevea company, a major player in the sector, moved to Southeast Asia. By 1920, there was practically no more latex extraction and Brazil contributed only 2% of world production. In the same year, Acre was dismembered from Amazonas, becoming a territory and, in 1962, a state.

With the end of the rubber production cycle, the economy of Amazonas went into decline once again. The state went through a crisis, the treasury lost revenue and practically reached zero, even neglecting to pay state employees for four years in a row. In 1924, Amazonas joined São Paulo in a civic-regionalist movement that demanded that the natives of the region take back political and cultural leadership. In 1943, as part of the defense strategy in World War II, the border territories of Rio Branco (now Roraima) and Guaporé (now Rondônia) were also dismembered from Amazonas, sparking protests in Manaus.

In 1953, in an attempt to restore growth in the region, the federal government created the Superintendence of the Amazon Economic Valorization Plan (SPVEA) in order to release funds for investment in infrastructure, such as the construction of the Manaus-Porto Velho and Manaus-Boa Vista highways. In 1966, the agency was replaced by the Superintendence for the Development of the Amazon (SUDAM), which was abolished by Fernando Henrique Cardoso in 2001 and recreated by Lula in 2003. Between 1964 and 1985, the military regime decided to build the Transamazon highway, but it was abandoned. The main impetus for growth came in 1967, when the Free Economic Zone of Manaus was created, a tax-free center for high-tech industries. The hub began to grow five years later, in 1972, at the end of the economic miracle.

From the 1960s to the 1990s, Gilberto Mestrinho was the main political leader, serving as governor three times until he was accused of corruption in the 1990s. In 1987, the discovery of oil in the Coari region was announced. In the following decade, Petrobrás set up the Urucu field and the Isaac Sabbá Refinery in Manaus. Currently, the company is responsible for most of the investments in the state, including the PIATAM (environmental research) projects and the construction of the Coari-Manaus gas pipeline.

== Gallery ==
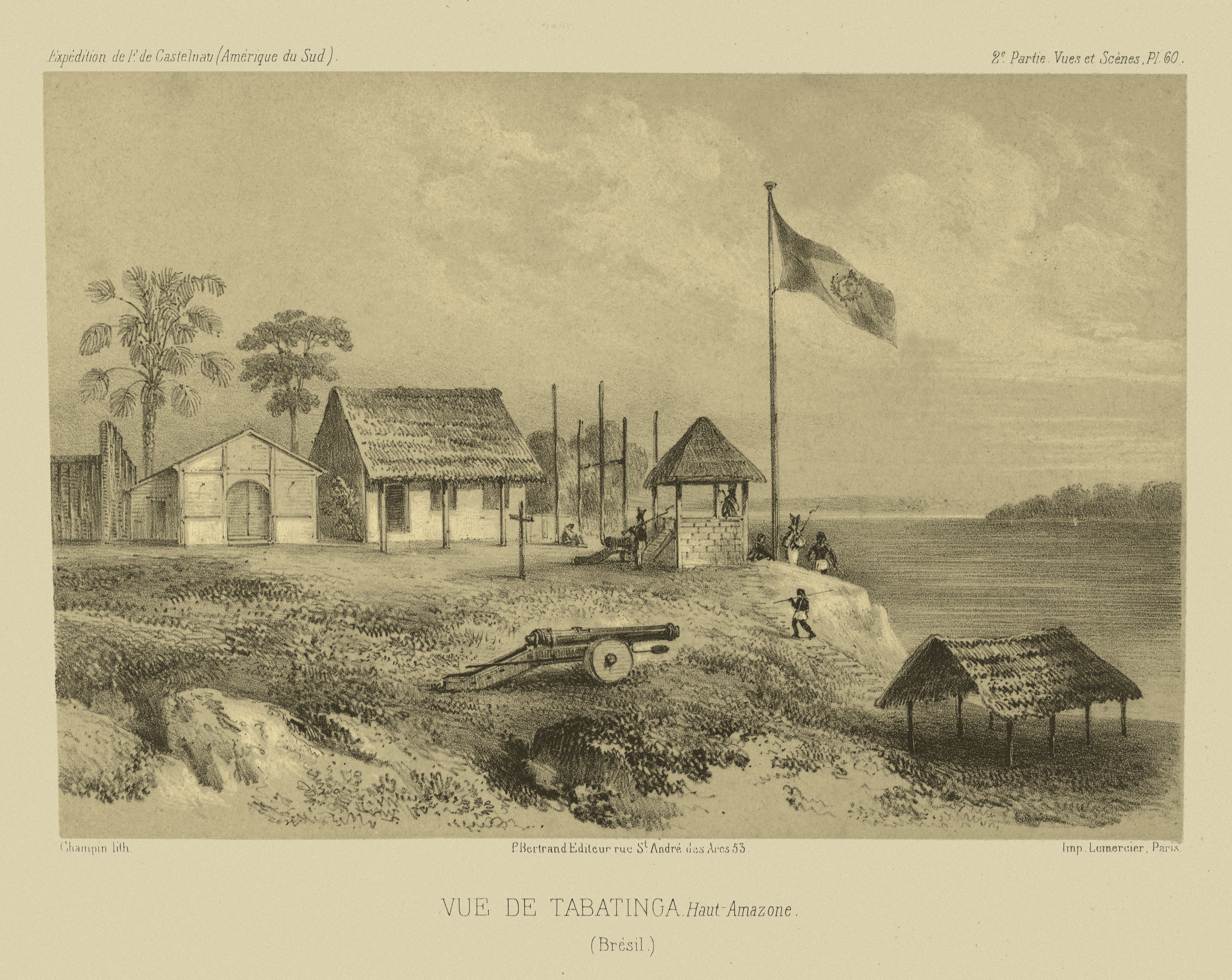
View of Tabatinga, 19th century.

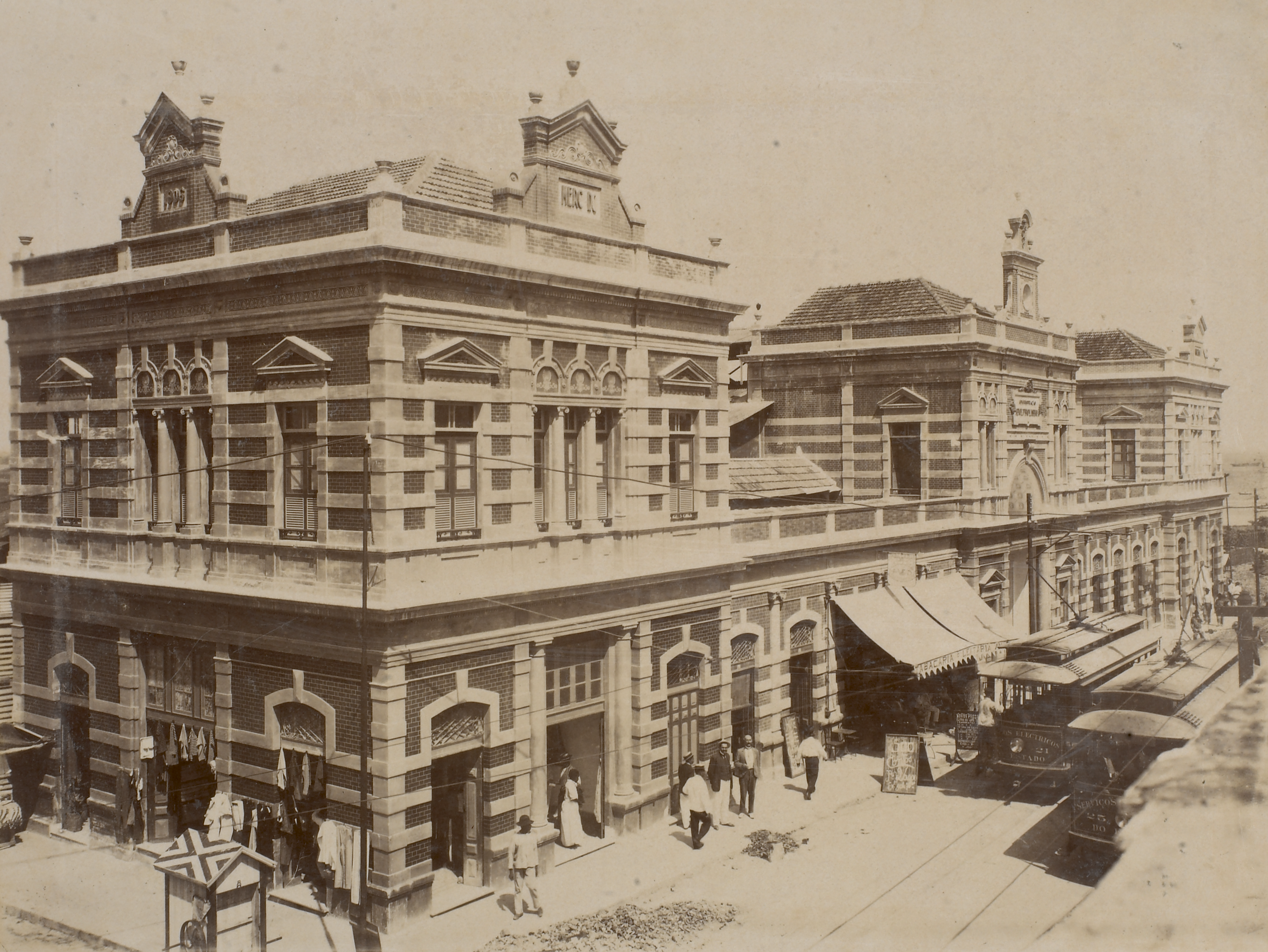
Public Market, Manaus, 1906.

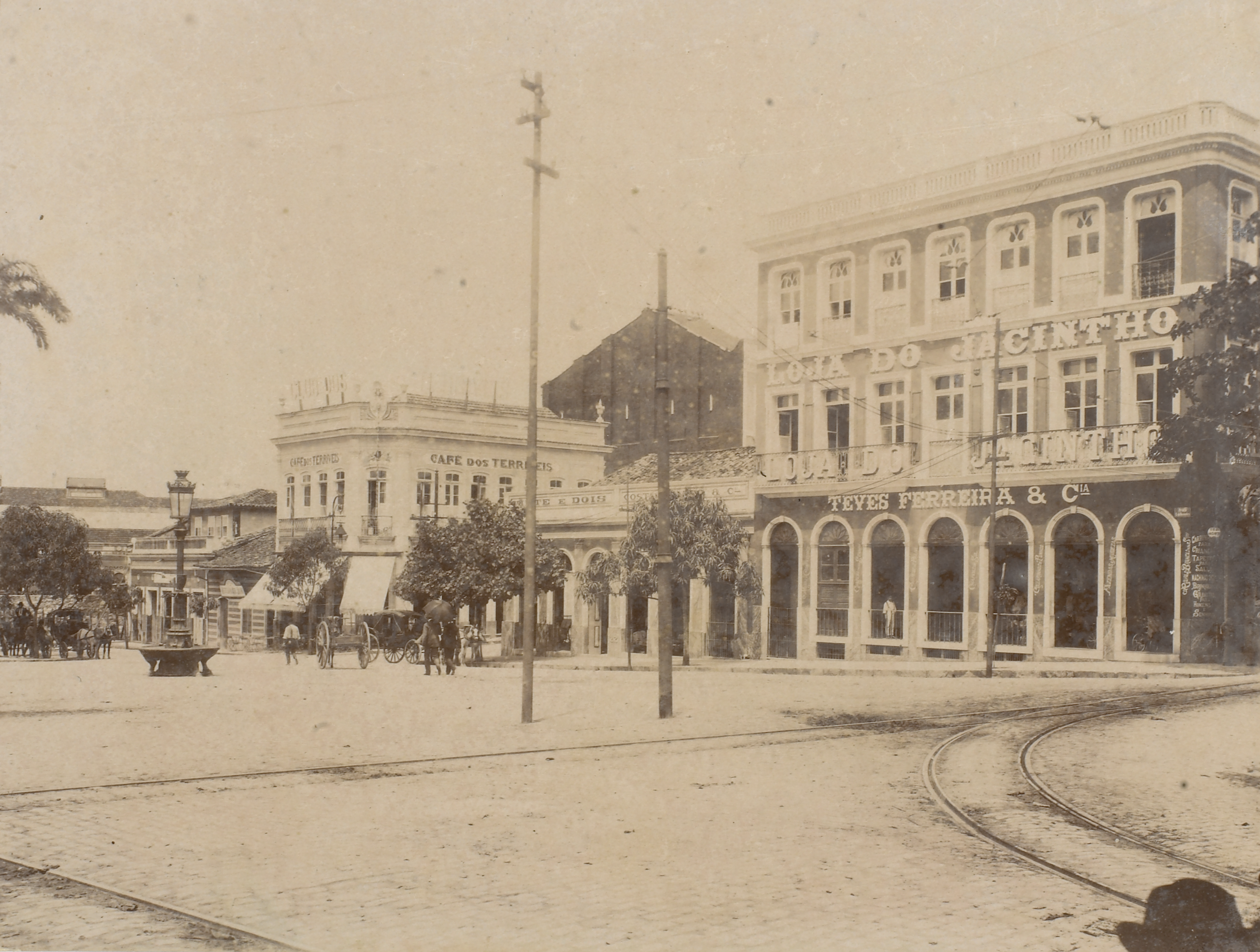
15 de Novembro Square, Manaus, 1906.

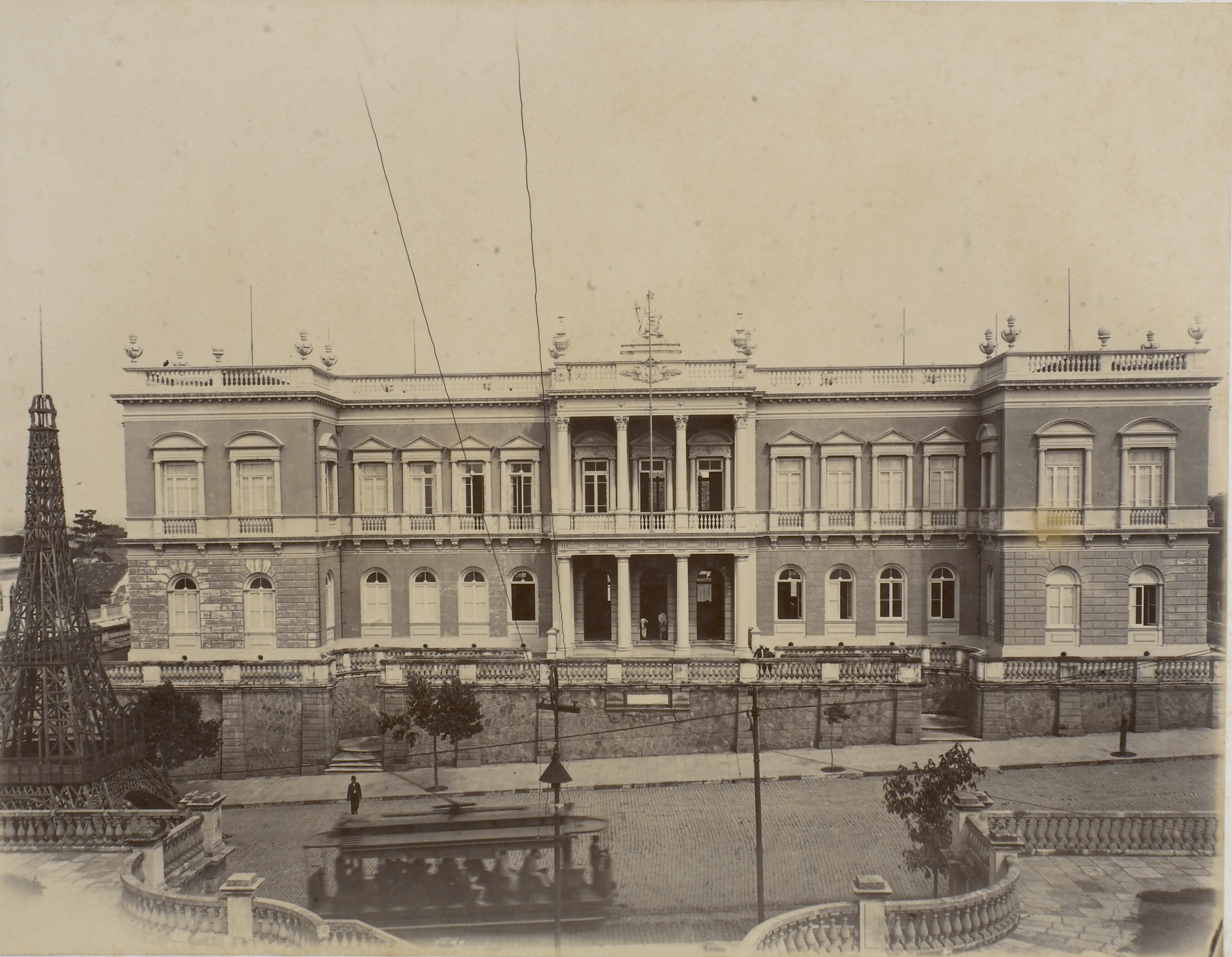
Palace of Justice, Manaus, 1906.

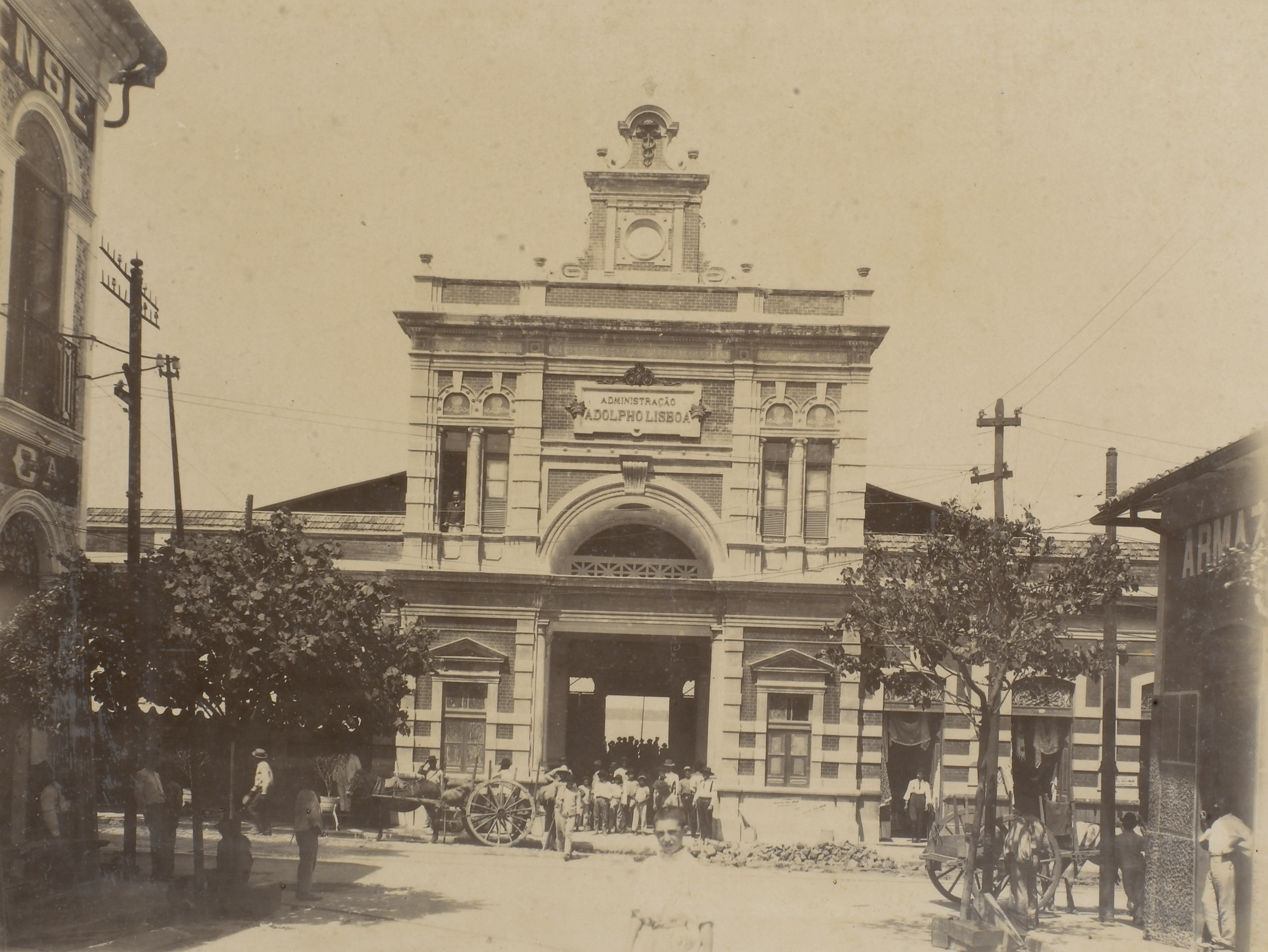
Facade of the Public Market, Manaus, 1906.

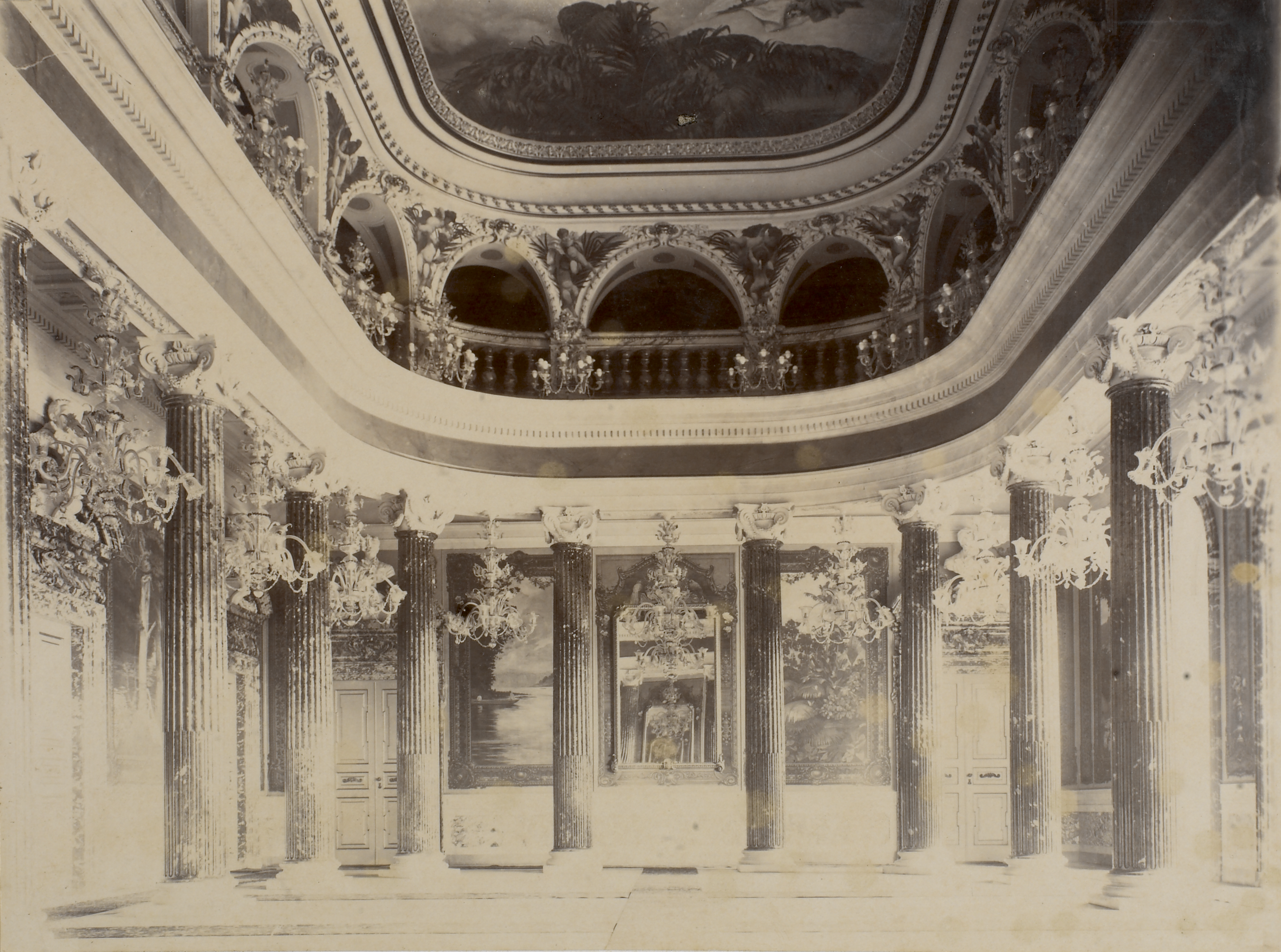
Great Hall of the Amazon Theater, Manaus, 1906.

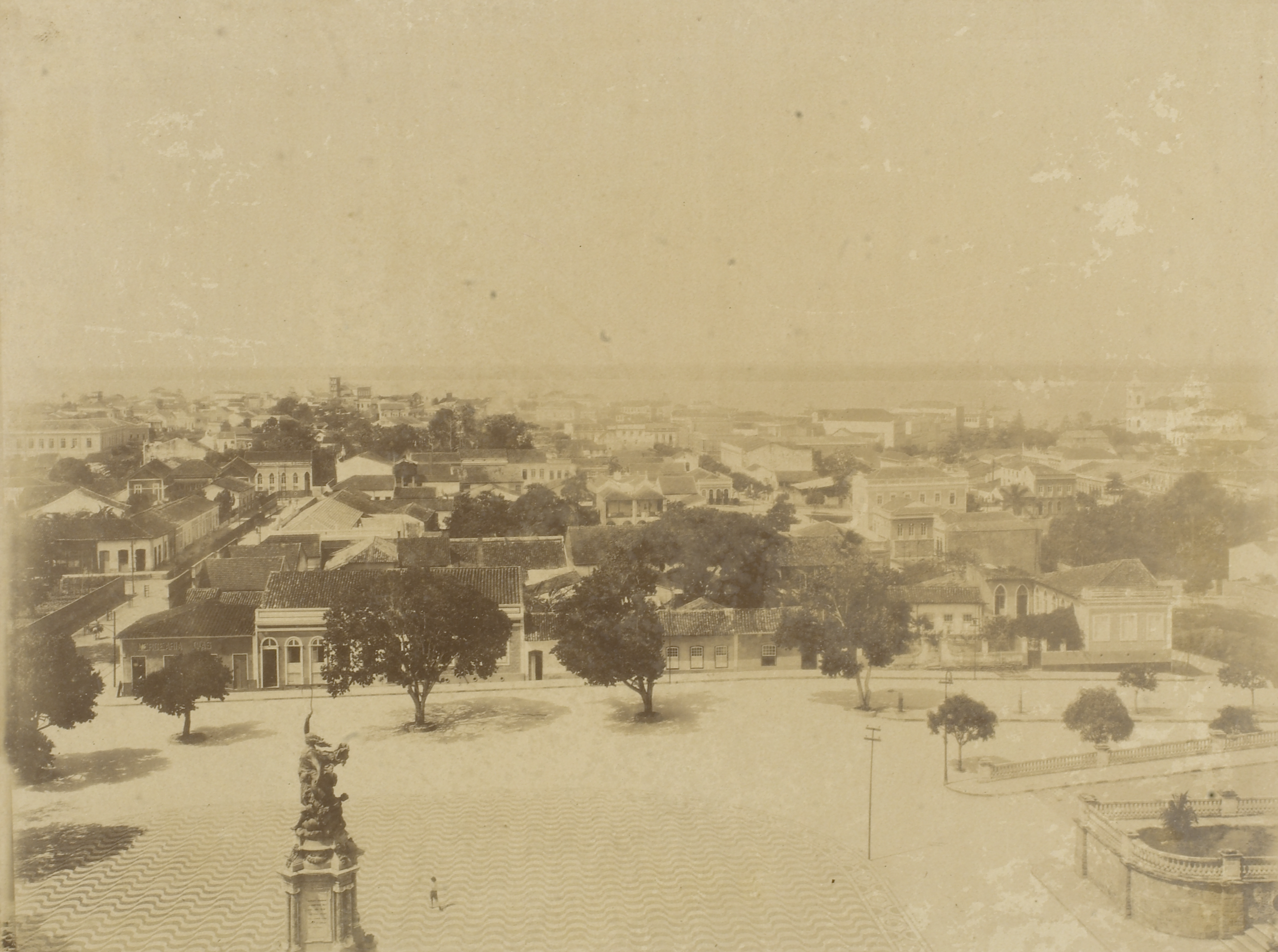
View of the city of Manaus, 1906.

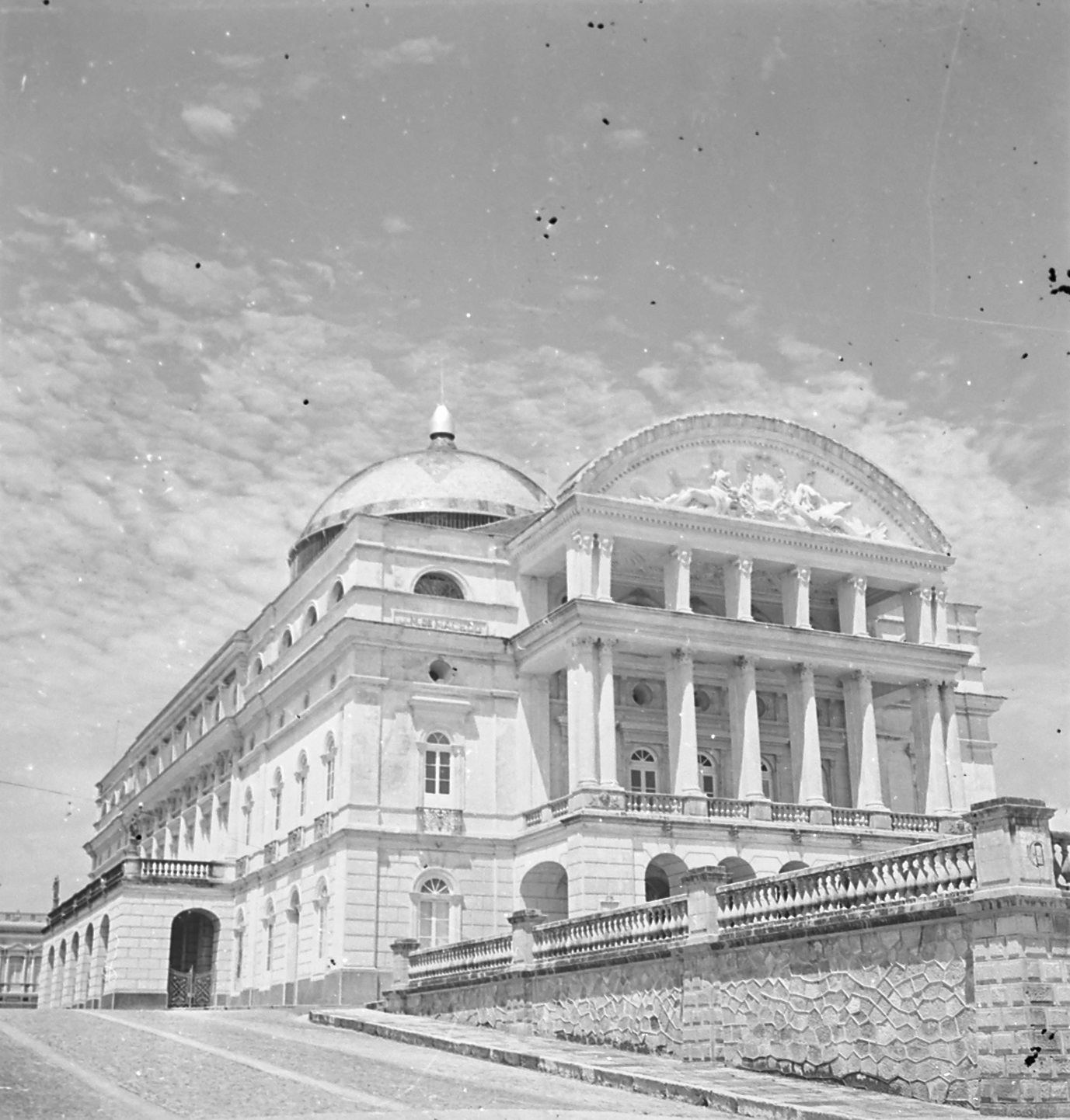
Amazon Theater, Manaus, 1940.

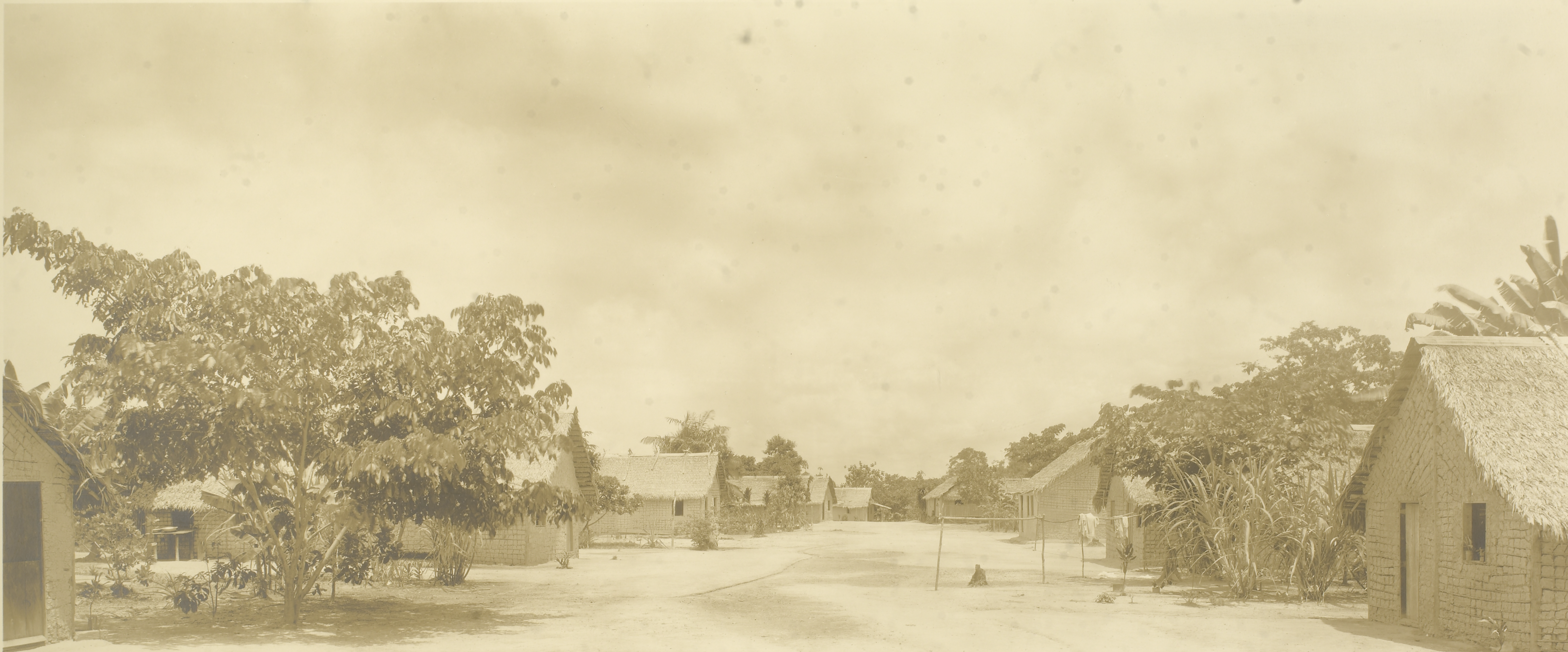
Tabatinga, 1930.

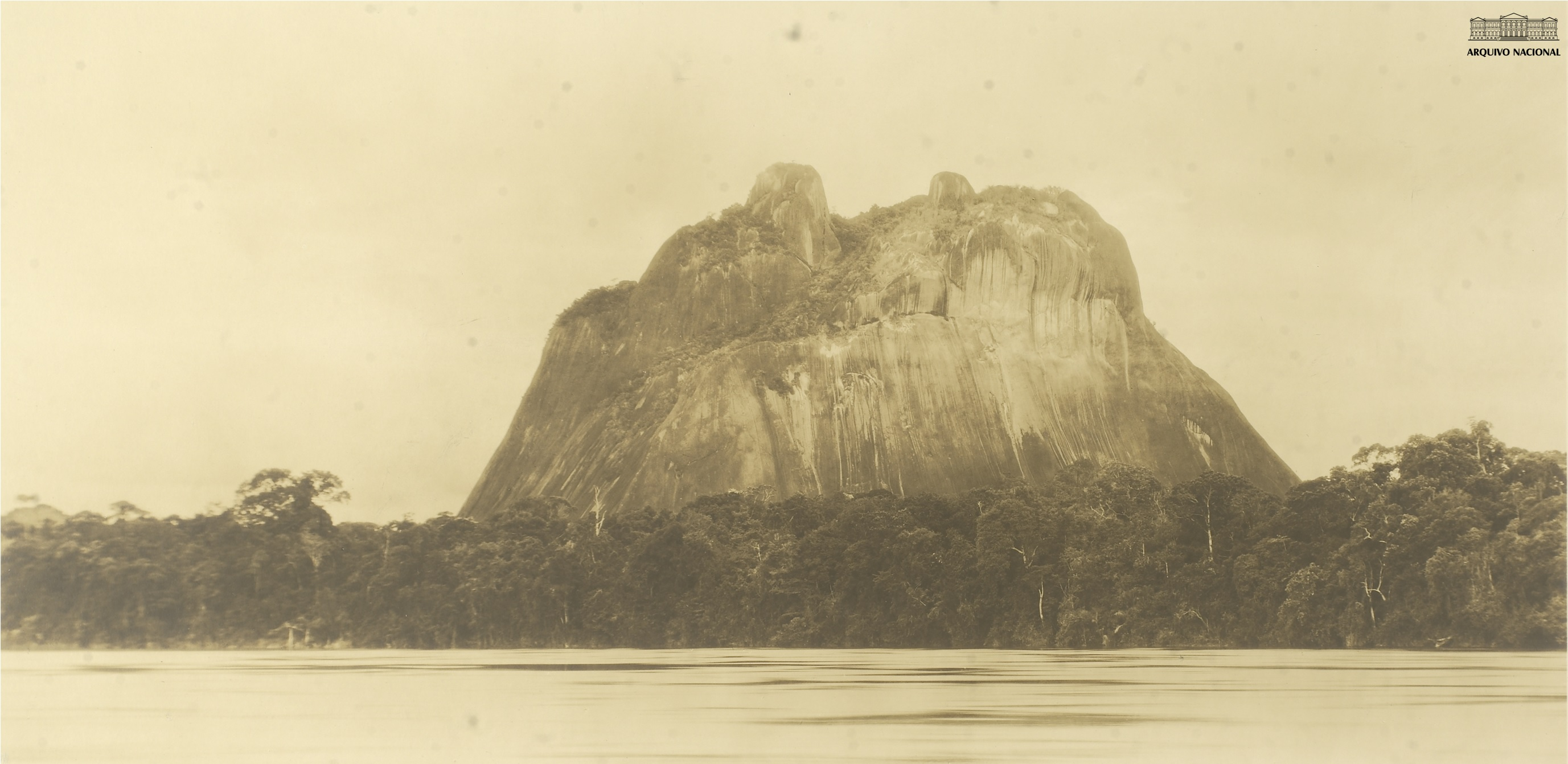
Cucuí Stone, 1930.

== See also ==
- History of Manaus
- History of Brazil
