= Timeline of Manaus =

The following is a timeline of the history of the city of Manaus, in Amazonas state, Brazil.

cu

== Prior to 20th century ==
- 1669 - Fort of São José da Barra do Rio Negro built.
- 1833 - Town council convenes in the former Fábrica Imperial.
- 1848 - Manaus elevated to the category of city.
- 1850 - Town becomes capital of Amazonas province.
- 1856 - Town renamed "Manaus."
- 1871 - Associação Comercial do Amazonas established.
- 1872 - Population: 29,334.
- 1878 - Metropolitan Cathedral of Manaus is inaugurated.
- 1883 - Mercado Adolpho Lisboa built.
- 1892 - Catholic Diocese of Amazonas established.
- 1896
  - Amazon Theatre opens.
  - Electric lighting introduced.
- 1900 - Population: 73,647.

== 20th century ==
- 1904 - Jornal do Commercio newspaper begins publication.
- 1910 - Free University School of Manaus established.
- 1913 - Nacional Futebol Clube formed.
- 1917 - Geographic and Historic Institute of Amazonas founded.
- 1920 - Population: 179,263.
- 1930 - Nacional Fast Clube (football team) formed.
- 1939 - América Futebol Clube formed.
- 1949 - A Crítica newspaper begins publication.
- 1961 - Estádio Ismael Benigno (stadium) opens.
- 1967 - Free Economic Zone of Manaus established.
- 1970
  - Manaus Air Force Base begins operating.
  - Vivaldão stadium opens.
  - Population: 284,118.
- 1974 - Nossa Senhora das Graças (Manaus) neighborhood established.
- 1976 - Eduardo Gomes International Airport opens.
- 1980 - Population: 922,477.
- 1989
  - Park of Mindu established.
  - Arthur Virgílio Neto becomes mayor.
- 1991 - Population: 1,010,544.
- 1996 - Festival Amazonas de Ópera begins.
- 1997
  - Amazonas Philharmonic founded.
  - Alfredo Nascimento becomes mayor.
- 2000 - Population: 1,347,590.

== 21st century ==
- 2005 - Park of Bilhares established.
- 2010 - Population: 1,802,014.
- 2011 - Rio Negro Bridge opens.
- 2012 - 7 October: Manaus 2012 municipal election held.
- 2013 - 2013 protests in Brazil.
- 2014 - Arena da Amazônia opens.
- 2016 - 2 October: Manaus 2016 municipal election held.
- 2017 - Prison riot at Anisio Jobim Penitentiary Complex .

== See also ==
- Manaus history
- History of Manaus
- List of mayors of Manaus
- Amazonas history (state)
- History of Amazonas (Brazilian state)

== Bibliography ==
=== in English ===
- Lauro B. Bitancourt. "City of Manaos". State of Amazon, Brazil. Campbell manufacturing co. hdl:2027/pst.000004522904. "World's Columbian Exposition, Chicago, 1893"
- Henry C. Pearson (1911). "(Manaos)". The rubber country of the Amazon. New York: India Rubber World. hdl:2027/hvd.32044107225872.
- Ernst B. Filsinger (1922), "Brazil: Manaos", Commercial Travelers' Guide to Latin America, Washington, DC: Government Printing Office
- E. Bradford Burns (1965). "Manaus, 1910: Portrait of a Boom Town". Journal of Inter-American Studies. 7 (3): 400–421. doi:10.2307/164992. JSTOR 164992.
- Leo A. Despres (1991). Manaus: Social Life and Work in Brazil's Free Trade Zone. State University of New York Press. ISBN 978-0-7914-0537-6.
- Trudy Ring and Robert M. Salkin, ed. (1995). "Manaus (Amazonas, Brazil)". Americas. International Dictionary of Historic Places. Routledge. p. 355+. ISBN 978-1-134-25930-4.

=== in Portuguese ===
- J.C.R. Milliet de Saint-Adolphe (1863), "Manaos", Diccionario geographico, historico e descriptivo, do imperio do Brazil (in Portuguese), Paris: J. P. Aillaud, hdl:2027/wu.89006303077 – via HathiTrust
