= History of Manaus =

Pre-historic to modern history of Manaus

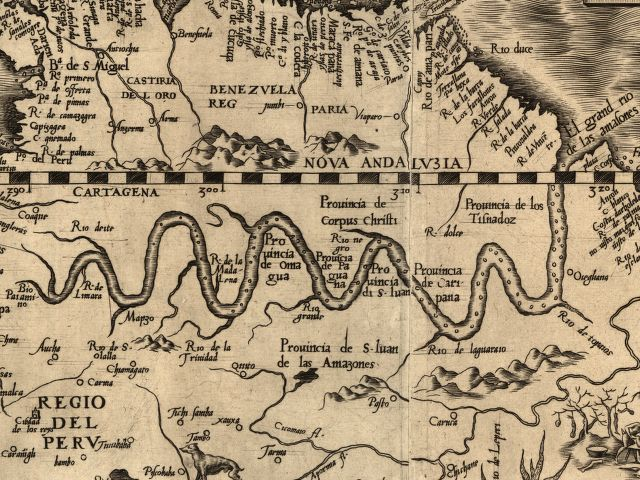
1562 map of the Amazon River region.

The history of Manaus, with over 350 years of existence, coincides with the history of Brazil. The process of European occupation began in the middle of the 16th century, when explorer Francisco de Orellana arrived from Peru and intended to go to Spain.

== First peoples and European colonization ==
At the time of the Portuguese colonisation, the region where the state of Amazonas is now located was part of Spain; however, it was occupied and colonized by Portugal. The period of European settlement in the Amazon began between 1580 and 1640, when Portugal and Spain remained under one crown. The occupation of the place where Manaus is today took a long time, considering that it was difficult to access and the existence of riches (gold and silver) was unknown.

On June 3, 1542, the Negro River was discovered by Francisco de Orellana, who gave it its name. The region where the Fort of São José da Barra do Rio Negro was located was first inhabited by the Manaó, Baré, Baniwa and Passé people, who helped build the fort and began to live in poor houses near it. The Manaó tribe, considered problematic by the Portuguese, refused to be dominated and serve as slave labor, leading to a confrontation with the colonizers. The fighting only ceased when the Portuguese military began to connect with them through marriages with the caciques' daughters, starting the intense miscegenation in the region and giving origin to the caboclos. One of the tribe's leaders was the indigenous Ajuricaba, a strong opponent of Portuguese colonization who, however, supported the Dutch. Ajuricaba's death was a great mystery: according to the official report, he was imprisoned and sent to Pará, dying on the way.

As a result of Portuguese colonization, an effort was made to wipe out the features and historical works of the native peoples. A great example was the destruction of the indigenous cemetery, where Dom Pedro Square and the Rio Branco Palace now stand. When Governor Eduardo Gonçalves Ribeiro remodeled the square and leveled the streets around it, a large number of igaçabas were found. Today, there is no sign indicating the existence of the cemetery.

== Foundation ==
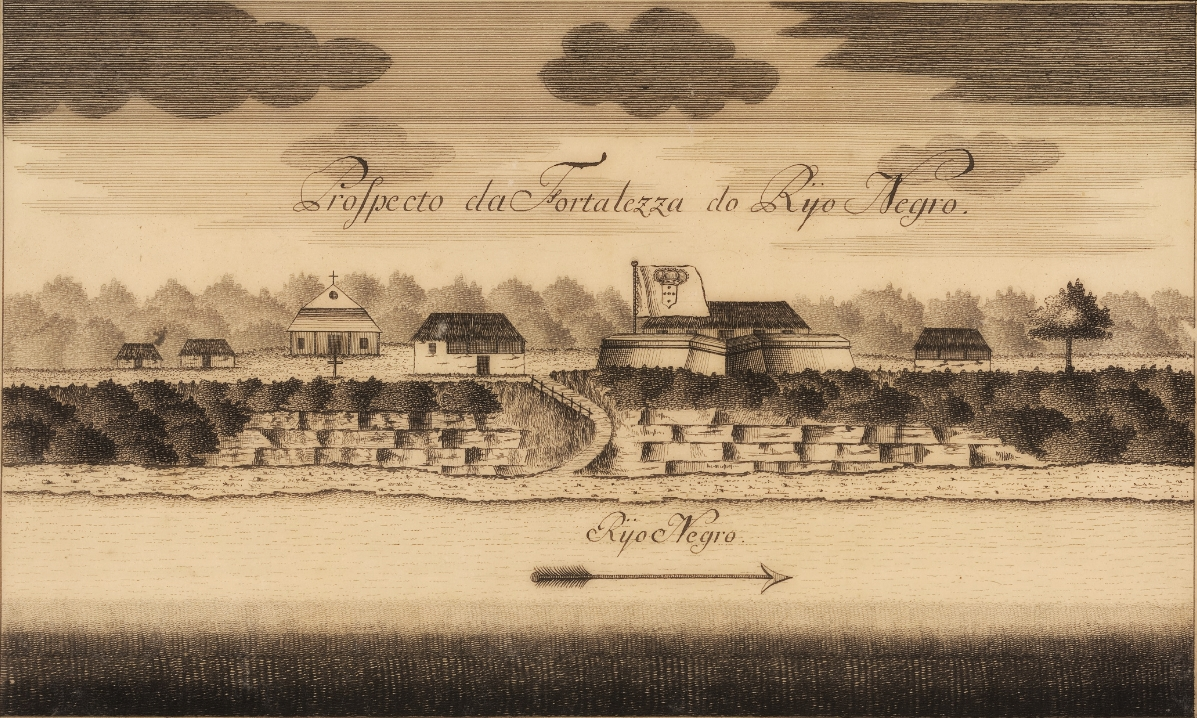
Draft of the Fort of São José da Barra do Rio Negro, drawn by the German engineer João André Schwebel, on December 7, 1754, when Francisco Xavier de Mendonça Furtado and his entourage were passing through Lugar da Barra on their way to Barcelos to set up the boundary demarcation conferences of the Treaty of Madrid.

The beginning of the Portuguese occupation of the territory where the city later emerged is traced to the arrival of the Carmelite missionaries in 1659. Manaus was founded in 1669 as a fortification to establish the Portuguese presence and protect the entrance to the Western Amazon from foreign invasions, especially by the Dutch and Spanish. The urban center, located on the left bank of the Negro River, began with the construction of the Fort of São José da Barra do Rio Negro, designed by Francisco da Mota Falcão, an artillery captain.

The population increased considerably and, to assist with catechism, the missionaries (Carmelites, Jesuits and Franciscans) decided to build, in 1695, a chapel next to the fort in honor of Our Lady of the Conception. The Royal Charter of March 3, 1755 created the Captaincy of São José do Rio Negro, with headquarters in Mariuá (now Barcelos), but Governor Lobo D'Almada, fearing Spanish invasions, moved the headquarters back to Lugar da Barra in 1791, as it was strategically located at the confluence of the Negro and Solimões rivers.

Lugar da Barra lost its political-administrative status under the control of Francisco de Souza Coutinho, captain-general of the Captaincy of Grão Pará, who started a campaign against the change of seat, which happened through the Royal Letter of August 22, 1798; in May 1799, the seat returned to Barcelos. As a result of losing its position, the decline of Lugar da Barra was inevitable. In October 1807, the governor of the Captaincy, José Joaquim Victório da Costa, left Barcelos, transferring the administration of the Captaincy definitively to Lugar da Barra.

From March 29, 1808, Lugar da Barra returned to being the seat of the Captaincy of São José do Rio Negro, following a proposal by Marcos de Noronha Brito to the governor José Joaquim Victório da Costa.

== Imperial period ==
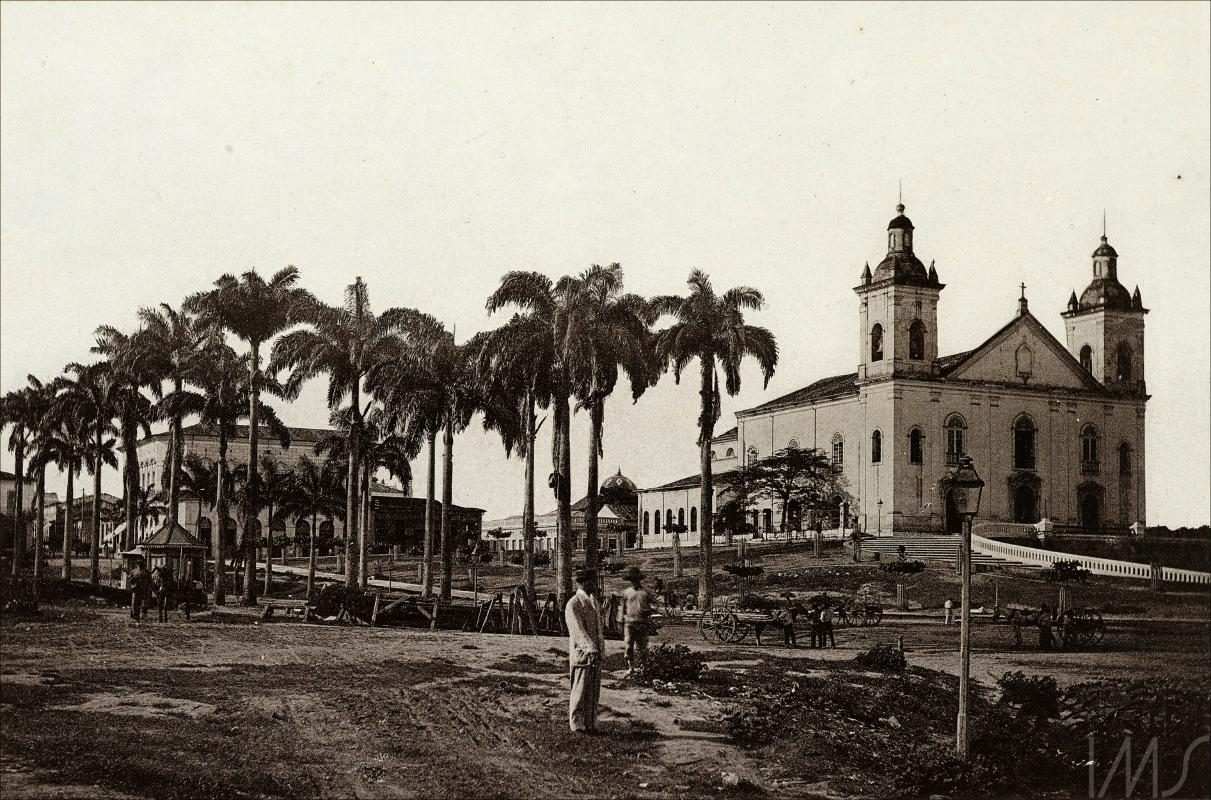
The Metropolitan Cathedral of Manaus, dating from 1858, traces its origins back to the old chapel of 1695, built by the Carmelite missionaries. In the photo, the Cathedral in the 1890s.

By decree of November 13, 1832, under the denomination of Nossa Senhora da Conceição da Barra do Rio Negro, the settlement was elevated to the category of village, a title it kept until October 24, 1848, when it was elevated to the category of city under the name of Cidade da Barra do Rio Negro. On September 5, 1850, the Province of Amazonas was created by Imperial Law No. 1,592, whose first president was João Batista de Figueiredo Tenreiro Aranha, appointed on July 27, 1851. During his administration, the Public Library was created and the first newspaper was founded on September 5, entitled A Província do Amazonas. Another notable journal in the city was Estrela do Amazonas, owned by Manuel da Silva Ramos. Both became the bases for the development of local culture, along with the theater and professional schools. On September 4, 1856, by Law 68, during the second administration of Herculano Ferreira Pena, the city was renamed Manaus, in honor of the Manaó indigenous people.

Between 1835 and 1840, a political movement and social conflict called Cabanagem took place in Pará, involving free and poor men, especially indigenous and mestiços, who rose up against the local political elite and seized power. The involvement of the Comarca of Alto Amazonas (today Manaus, which was the origin of the manifesto of the Brazil's Legal Amazon) into the conflict was fundamental to the creation of the current state of Amazonas. During the period of the revolution, the combatants from the Alto Amazonas explored every part of the territory where there was a settlement, in order to attract a greater number of followers to the movement, resulting in the integration of the surrounding populations and the formation of the state.

== Rubber era ==
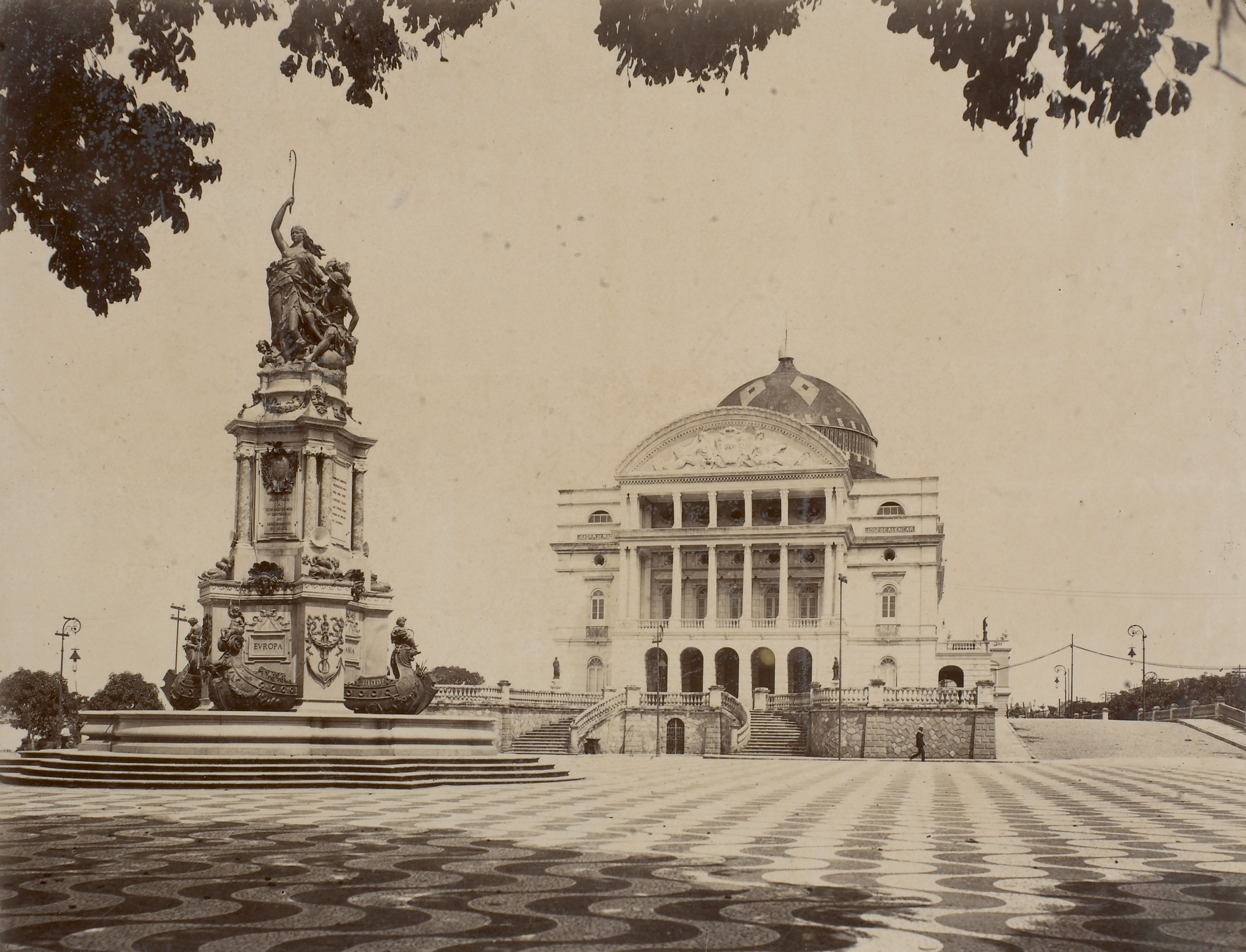
Amazon Theatre in 1906, the most significant expression of wealth in the city during the rubber era.

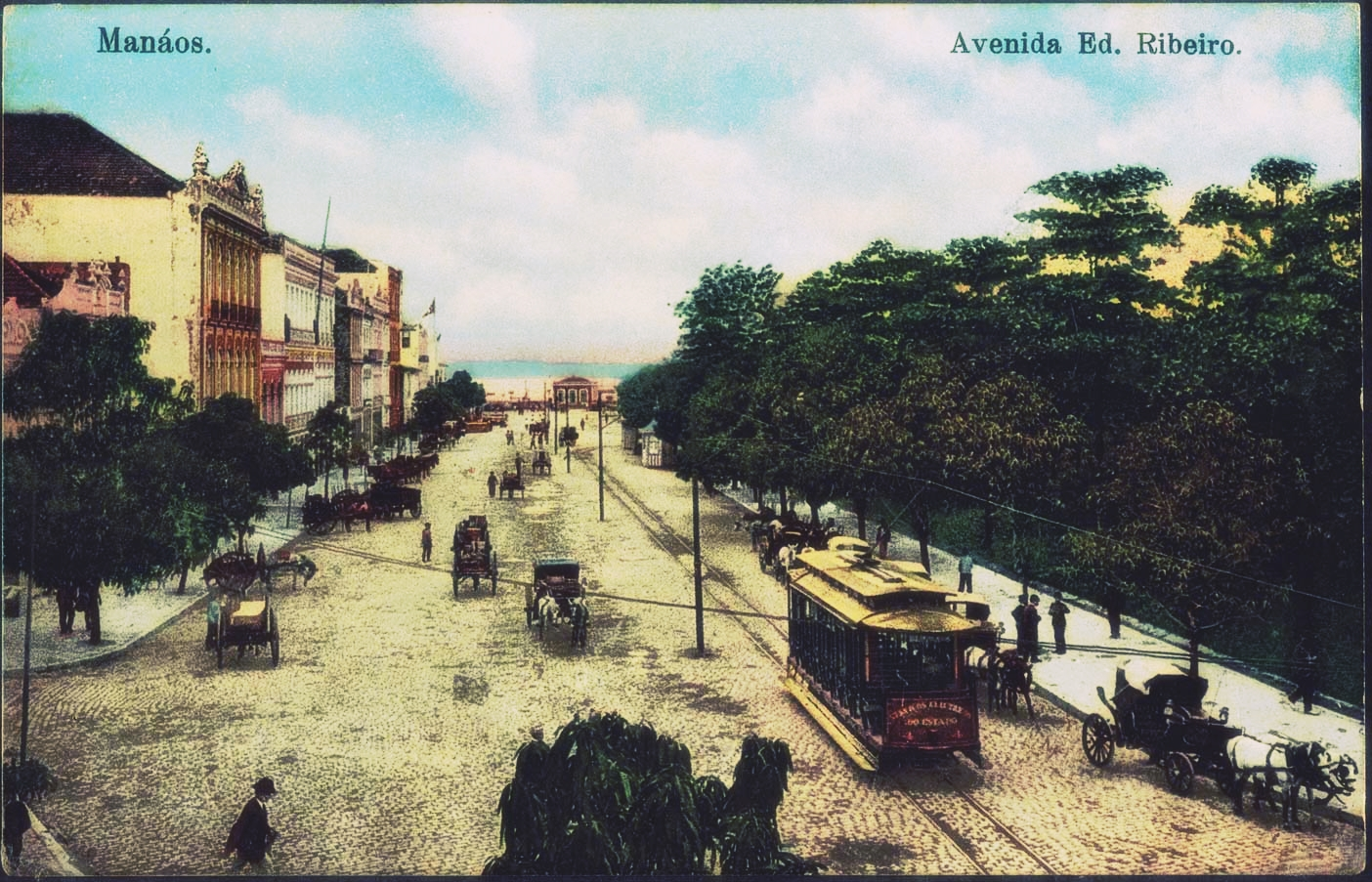
Manaus was the second city in Brazil (after Campos, Rio de Janeiro) to introduce electricity for street lighting.

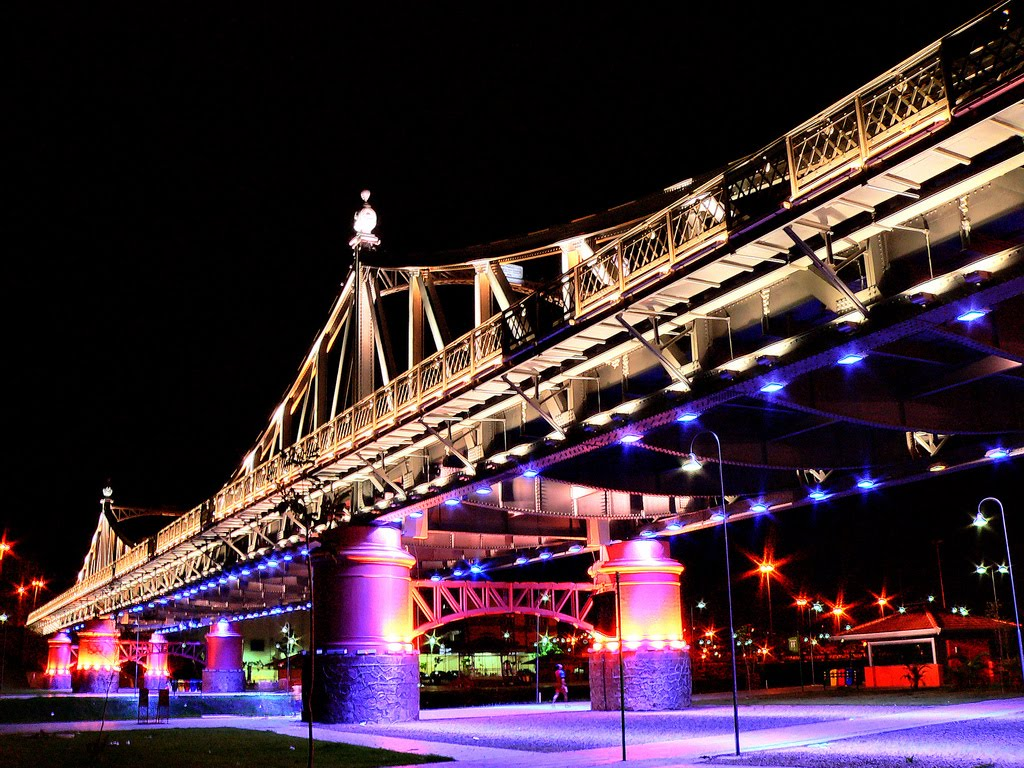
The Benjamin Constant Bridge, dating from 1893, is another classic example of the city of Manaus' strength during the rubber cycle.

In Rio de Janeiro, on November 15, 1889, the Republic of Brazil was proclaimed and the Empire was extinguished. The province of Amazonas became the state of Amazonas, with the city of Manus as its capital. Rubber, a raw material for the world's industries, was increasingly in demand and Amazonas, as one of the world's main producers, focused its economy on satisfying the growing market. The process of migration to Manaus by Brazilians from other regions, especially from the Northeast, intensified. According to the 1872 census, 2,199 foreigners immigrated to the state, attracted by the production of rubber, with the majority of them living in Manaus. The immigrants were mainly Portuguese, English, French, Italian and from other regions of America, leading to a demographic growth that required the city to undergo significant changes.

At that time, the Brazilian Northeast was hit by the Great Drought, which caused more than a million deaths, as well as a major cholera epidemic. Many northeasterners came to Manaus to escape this disaster, arriving in large numbers. Despite the decline of rubber at the beginning of the 20th century, the city kept receiving a remarkable number of immigrants. The 1920 census registered 9,963 foreign inhabitants in Amazonas, with most of them living in Manaus. Japanese, Turks and Germans were registered in this list.

The period between 1890 and 1910 was known as the golden age of rubber. In 1892, the government of Eduardo Ribeiro started, who played an important role in transforming the city by drawing up and implementing a plan to coordinate its growth. At this time, Manaus gained a public transport service of electric streetcars, telephones, electricity (the second in Brazil) and piped water, as well as a floating port, which began to receive ships of different sizes and from different countries. Manaus began the 1900s with long, straight streets, paved with granite and lioz stones imported from Portugal, well-kept squares and gardens, beautiful fountains and monuments, a sumptuous theater, hotels, banks, palaces and all the refinements of a modern city.

During the golden age of rubber, Manaus was an international reference point for discussions on tropical diseases, sanitation and public health. Numerous actions were promoted in these fields, such as the partnership with international scientists that culminated in the eradication of yellow fever in 1913. At the beginning of the 20th century, sanitation efforts were practically restricted to Manaus. The situation changed after the creation of the Rural Sanitation and Prophylaxis Service, which took sanitation to other parts of Amazonas. The infrastructure of the time included fixed bases of operation in the channels of the main rivers and boats that traveled through the riverside communities. The height of the economic cycle brought to the city the same improvements that reached Rio de Janeiro, the then federal capital. The development also provided a great circulation of ideas and allowed the emergence of a nucleus of doctors who were aware of the most advanced scientific discussions regarding the fight against tropical diseases. Newly established schools of tropical medicine, such as those in London and Liverpool, England, frequently sent students to Manaus.

In 1910, the city was surprised by the very strong competition from natural rubber planted and extracted in Asia, which invaded the international markets at a vertiginous rate. It was the end of the dominance of the export of the product from the natural rubber plantations of the Amazon (almost exclusively generated in Amazonas), and the beginning of a slow economic agony for the region. Manaus' trade performance became critical and imports of luxury and superfluous goods quickly declined. The city, abandoned by those who could afford to leave, went through a major financial crisis. The buildings and the different public services were abandoned.

== Industrialization and growth ==
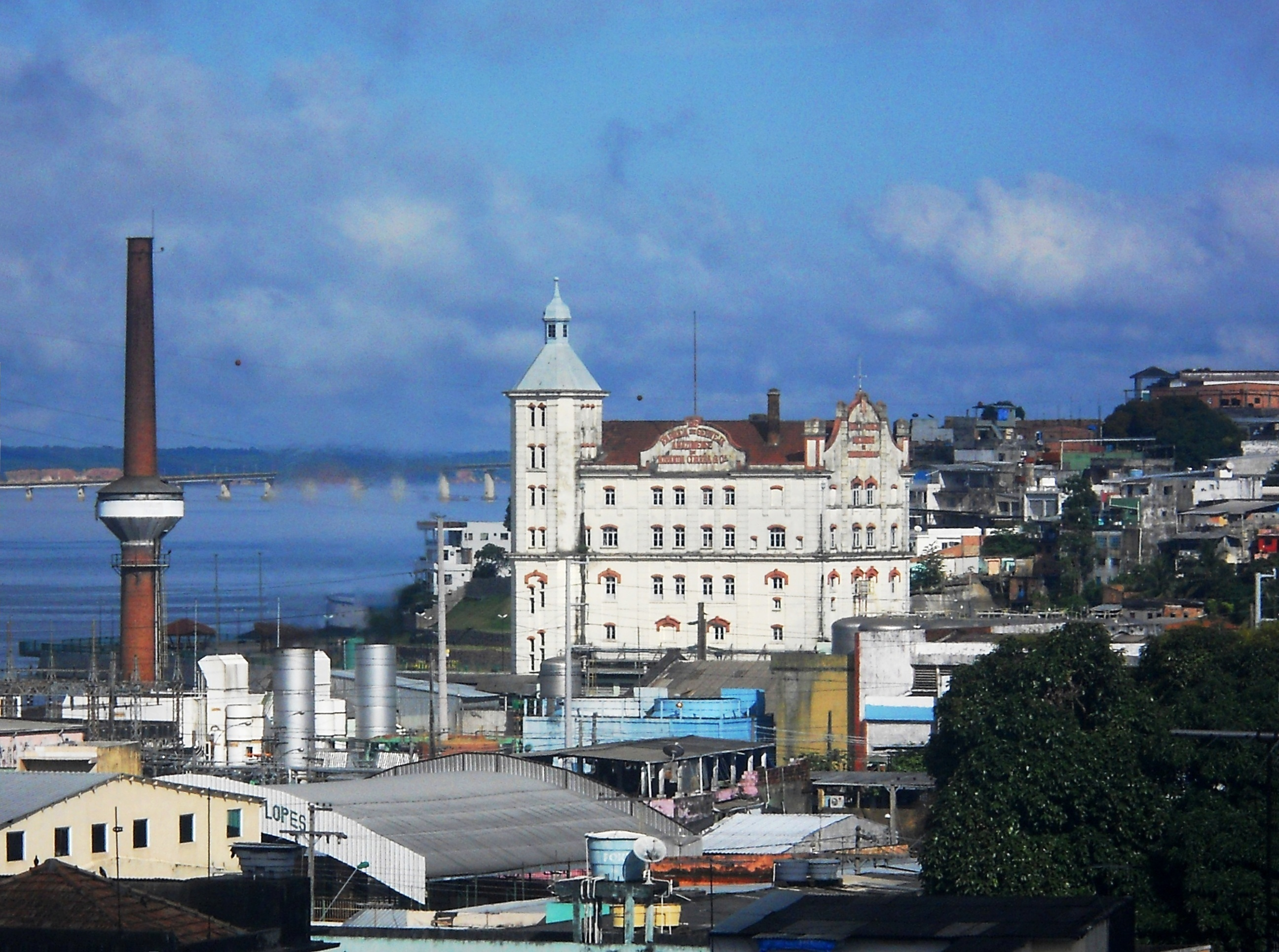
Historic building of the Cervejaria Miranda Corrêa.

Manaus, 1975. National Archives.

In 1967, with the establishment of the Free Economic Zone of Manaus, the city once again became one of the leading economies in Brazil and Latin America. Alongside Cuiabá, in Mato Grosso, it is the capital that has grown the most economically in the last forty years, a fact explained mainly by the industrialization process in Manaus, which also attracted thousands of migrants who occupied the outskirts of the city in a disorderly way.

The military government in Brazil proposed to occupy a largely unpopulated region, with the justification of creating conditions for economic profitability. The huge urban and demographic expansion of Manaus in the 1970s had both positive and negative consequences for the municipality, which was forced to house more and more migrants from different Brazilian states and from the interior of Amazonas, attracted by a better quality of life.

In the 1970s, with the expansion of industrialization, the city developed an extensive commercial and communication network and services that still serve the whole of the Western Amazon. In a 1978 study, Manaus was recognized as a regional metropolis by the Brazilian Institute of Geography and Statistics (IBGE).

As a measure to counteract the large irregular occupations of plots in Manaus, the government began to create regular allotments for migrants arriving in the city. Neighborhoods like Cidade Nova, São José Operário and Armando Mendes emerged from this initiative. During this period, environmental degradation increased, especially in the eastern and northern zones, since these areas of the city have suffered the most with river pollution, loss of biodiversity and native forest in recent years. On July 10, 1980, thousands of people filled the Metropolitan Cathedral of Manaus and its surroundings to welcome Pope John Paul II, who met with church authorities and gave a speech.

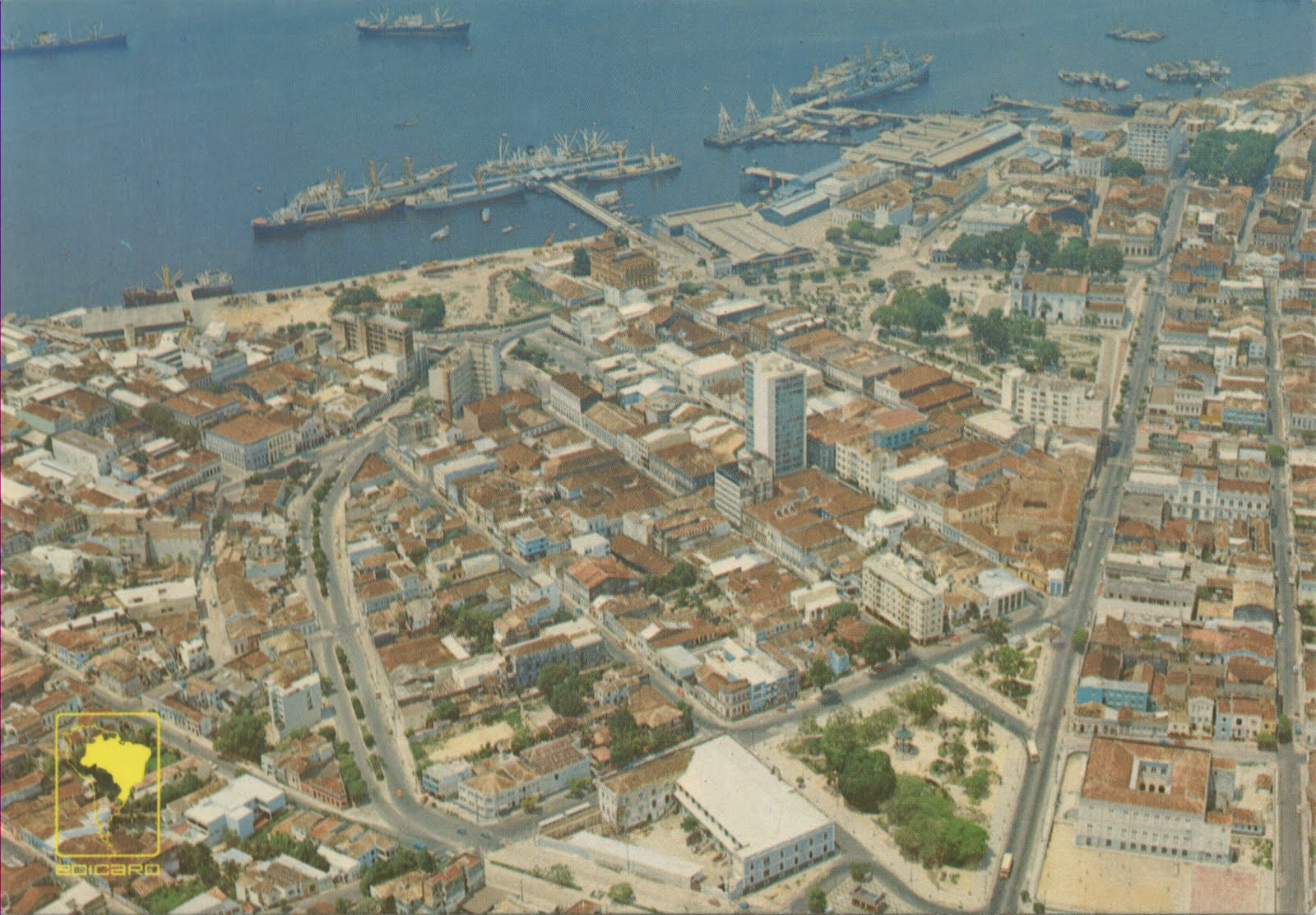
Port region of Manaus, c. 1970.

In 1991, the municipality exceeded 1 million inhabitants, and in 2014 it exceeded 2 million, doubling its population in 23 years. It is currently the 26th most populous city in America and the 7th most populous in Brazil, housing almost half the population of Amazonas. In economic terms, it is among the five fastest-growing Brazilian municipalities with a share of more than 0.5% of the country's GDP. In educational aspects, it has the Federal University of Amazonas, the oldest in Brazil, founded in 1909.

According to data released by the United Nations Development Program (UNDP), Manaus' HDI rose from 0.601 in 2000 to 0.737 in 2010, a growth rate of 22.63%. However, when analyzing the increase over the last two decades, from 1991 to 2010, Manaus was below the national and state growth averages; it had an increase of 41.46%, while the national average was 47.46% and the state average 56.74%. On May 30, 2007, through State Law No. 52, the Greater Manaus was created to organize, plan and execute public functions and services of metropolitan or common interest.

== See also ==
- Timeline of Manaus
- History of Brazil
- History of Amazonas
