= Benjamin Constant Bridge =

Structure in Manaus, Amazonas, Brazil

Benjamin Constant Bridge Ponte Benjamin Constant
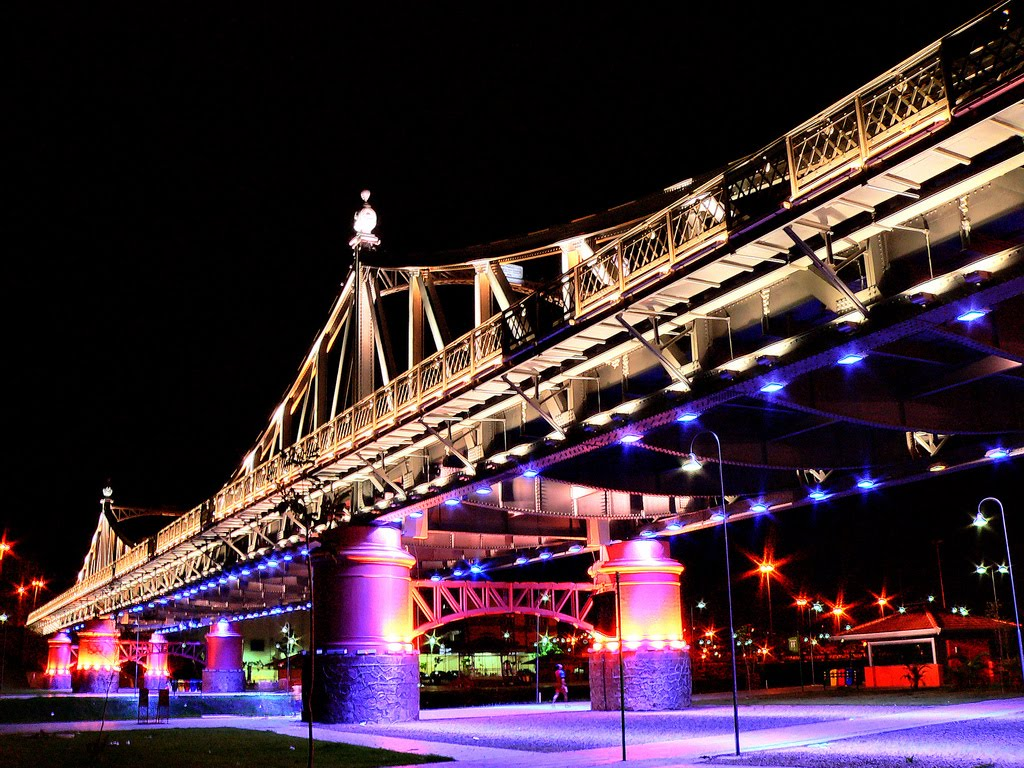
- Benjamin Constant Bridge at night
- Coordinates: 03°08′05.25″S 60°00′37″W
- Carries: 3
- Crosses: Igarapé do Mestre Chico
- Locale: Manaus, Amazonas; Brazil
- Other name: Metallic bridge

Characteristics
- Design: Suspension bridge
- Total length: 161m
- Width: 10.5m
- Height: 30m
- Longest span: 60m

History
- Designer: Frank Hirst Hebblethwaite (engineer)
- Construction start: 1893
- Inaugurated: September 7, 1895; 130 years ago

Location
- Interactive map of Benjamin Constant Bridge

The Benjamin Constant Bridge (Portuguese: Ponte Benjamin Constant), also known as Metallic Bridge (Ponte Metálica), is a suspension structure located on Sete de Setembro Avenue that crosses the Igarapé do Mestre Chico between the Cachoeirinha and Centro neighborhoods, in the Brazilian city of Manaus, capital of the state of Amazonas.

Construction began in 1893 under the supervision of English engineer Frank Hirst Hebblethwaite. The following year, the masonry pillars were ready to receive the metal structure, whose parts were manufactured by the English company Dorman Long & Company Limited, a firm that still exists today.

== History ==
To provide greater safety for the population, the then state governor Eduardo Ribeiro decided to build the bridge in iron and steel. During this period, Manaus was developing a style of architecture that was entirely English, exemplified by the Adolpho Lisboa Municipal Market.

The bridge, which is considered one of the most beautiful in Brazil and one of the most imposing in Manaus, was built between 1893 and 1895 with parts imported from England, supervised by engineer Frank Hirst Hebblethwait and inaugurated on September 7, 1895.

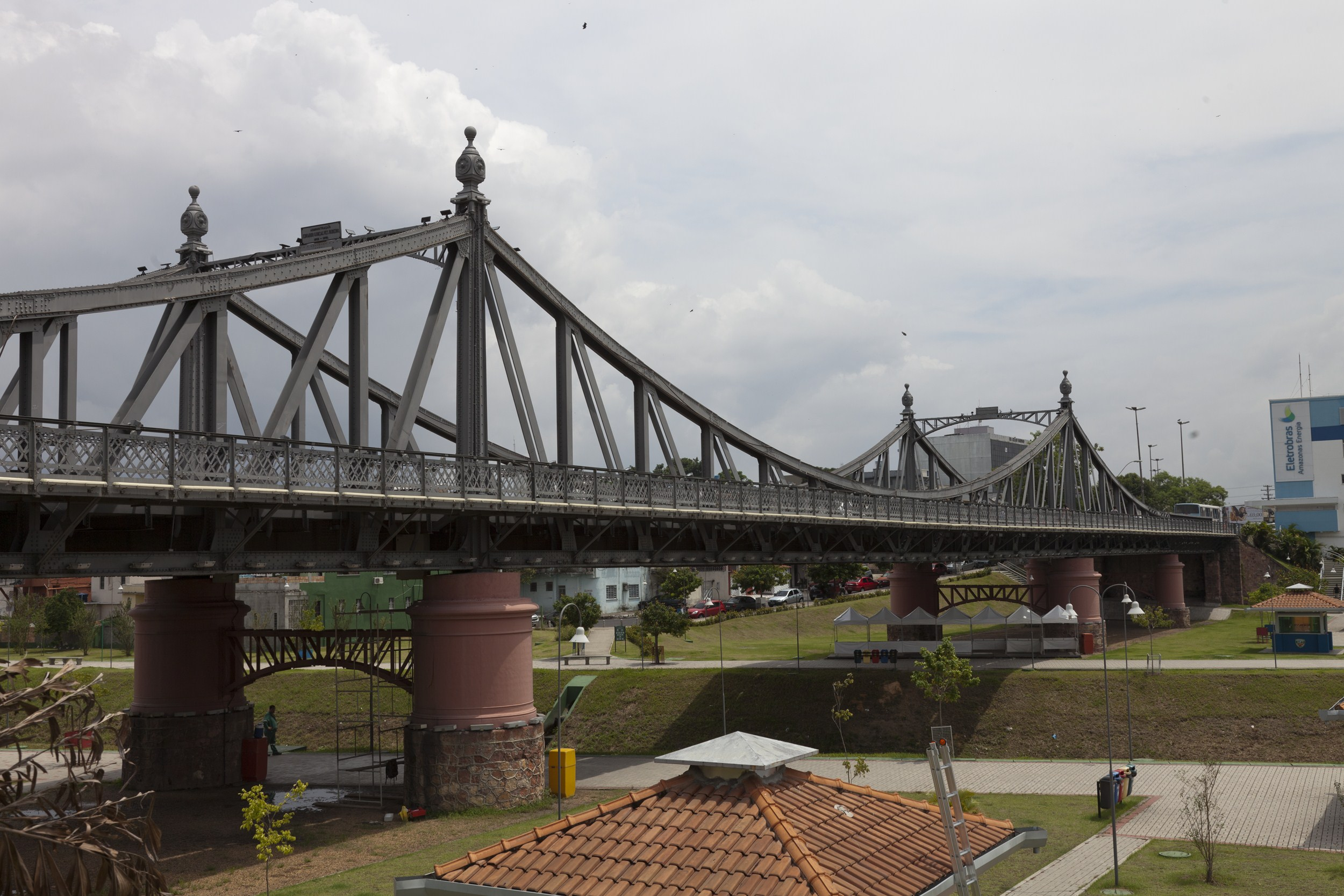
The Benjamin Constant Bridge crosses the Igarapé do Mestre Chico.

The Benjamim Constant Bridge is known by other names such as Terceira Ponte (Third Bridge), Ponte Metálica (Metallic Bridge) and Ponte da Cachoeirinha (Cachoeirinha Bridge). It was completely rebuilt in 1938 during Álvaro Maia's administration. In 1967, during the administration of then governor Danilo de Mattos Areosa, the second recovery process began, under the responsibility of CSN (Companhia Siderúrgica Nacional), a company based in Rio de Janeiro, in partnership with DER-AM (Amazonas Department of Roads and Highways).

Without renovation for almost twenty years, on January 25, 2005, the bridge was closed to heavy vehicle traffic due to the risk of collapse. Two years later, the state government began to restore it as part of the Manaus Igarapés Social and Environmental Program - Prosamim. Empresa de Construção Civil e Elétrica Ltda. - Econcel was responsible for carrying out the work, which, in addition to state resources, was funded by the Federal Government and the Inter-American Development Bank (IDB).

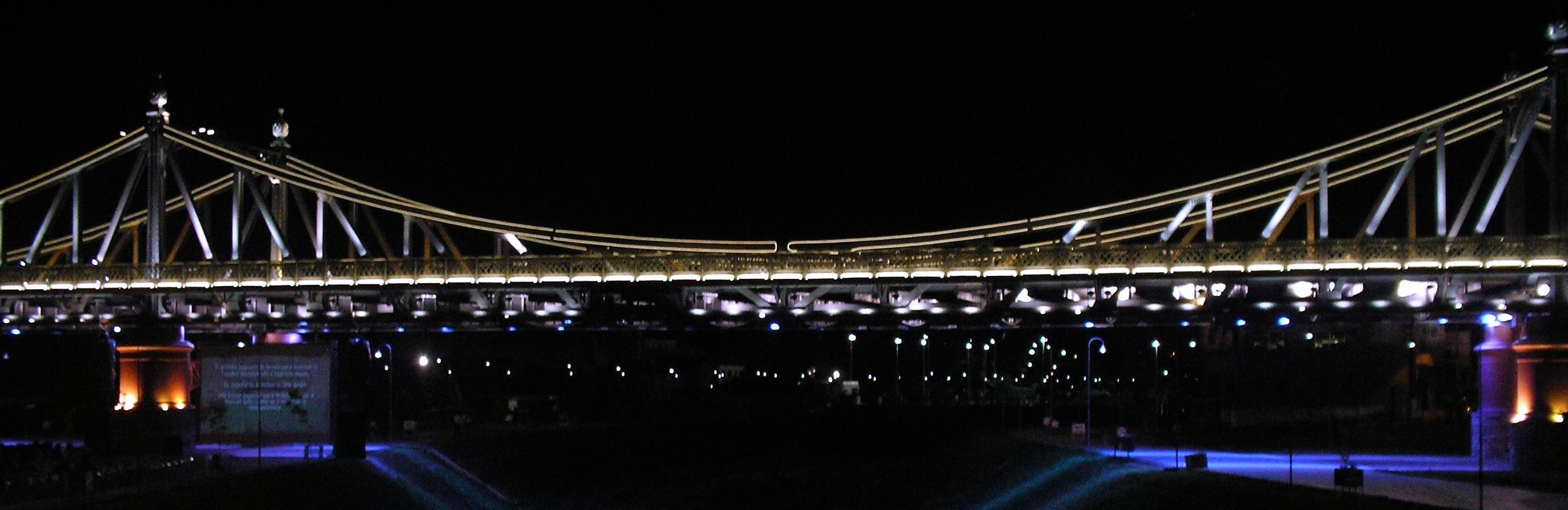
Panorama of the Benjamin Constant Bridge.

== Structure ==
Over 120 years old, the Benjamin Constant Bridge, which is 161 meters long and 10.50 meters wide, with two spans of twenty meters, two of thirty meters and one of sixty meters, was reopened on September 25, 2008, along with the first stage of the Largo do Mestre Chico.

The bridge had its structure reinforced to withstand the heavy traffic on the avenue, while maintaining its original characteristics. In 2009, it was completely renovated again under Eduardo Braga's government.

According to a historical survey carried out during the Amazonino Mendes administration by the Secretariat of Communication (1987), the first bridge in the neighborhood was built of wood and called Itacoatiara Bridge by the locals.

== See also ==
- Palácio Rio Negro
- Rio Negro Bridge
- History of Manaus
