= Palácio Rio Negro, Manaus =

Residence of the governor of the state of Amazonas in Brazil

Coordinates: 3.1351°S 60.0168°W

Rio Negro Palace
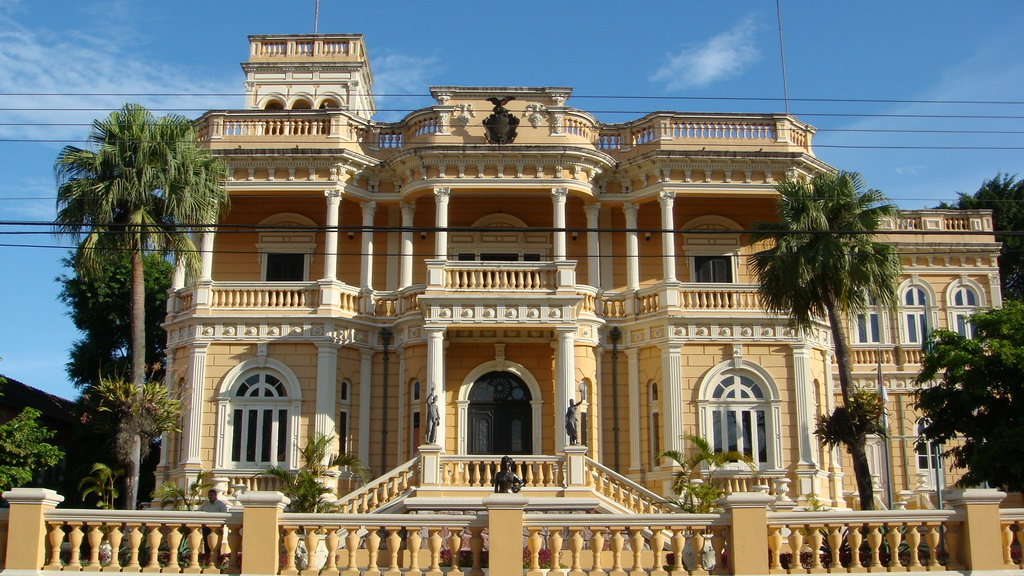
- Rio Negro Palace in Manaus, North Region, Brazil
- Interactive map of the Rio Negro Palace area

General information
- Architectural style: eclectic style
- Location: Downtown Manaus, Brazil, Manaus, Brazil
- Current tenants: Rio Negro Palace Museum
- Construction started: 1903
- Completed: 1911
- Owner: Amazonas State Government

The Palácio Rio Negro in Manaus, Brazil, is a former seat of government and residence of the governor of the state of Amazonas. The original name was Scholz Palace, built by the German entrepreneur Karl Waldemar Scholz, who was considered to be a "Rubber Baron". The name was changed to Palácio Rio Negro in 1918 when the palace was purchased by the governor of the Brazilian state of Amazonas, Pedro de Alcântara Bacellar.

== History ==
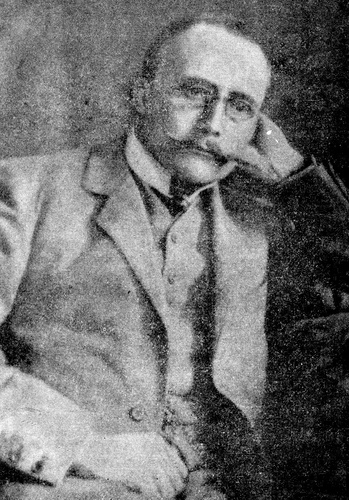
Karl Waldemar Scholz, first owner of the building

The Scholz Palace was built in an eclectic style in 1903 to be the private residence of the wealthy rubber merchant, Karl Waldemar Scholz. The state of Amazonas at the time was one of the most prosperous states in Brazil due to rubber production.

In 1911, because of stiff competition from rubber production in Asia, there was a decline in the Amazon rubber trade. In addition, with the onset of World War I, the navigation line between Manaus and Hamburg in Germany was interrupted, which greatly undermined the business of Scholz.

Scholz, president of the Commercial Association of Amazonas from 1911 and consul of Austria since 1913, in an attempt to resolve his debts, mortgaged the residence for 400,000,000 réis (the currency of Brazil at that time) to a rich rubber trader of the Purus (a river in the Amazon region), Luiz da Silva Gomes, who later purchased the residence at auction. The Scholz family left the Amazon region and returned to Germany.

At first, the Scholz Palace was rented to the government of Amazonas, for 1,000,000 réis per month, through the governor, Sir Pedro de Alcantara Bacellar, in spite of the economic crisis in the Amazon region, the shortcomings of the state secretary of finances and the criticism of his opponents. The government acquired the palace in 1918 for an amount of 200,000,000 réis, and it was given the name Palácio Rio Negro. From 1918 until 1995 it served as the seat of government in Amazonas state, although it ceased to be the governor's residence in 1959.

== Cultural Center Palácio Rio Negro ==
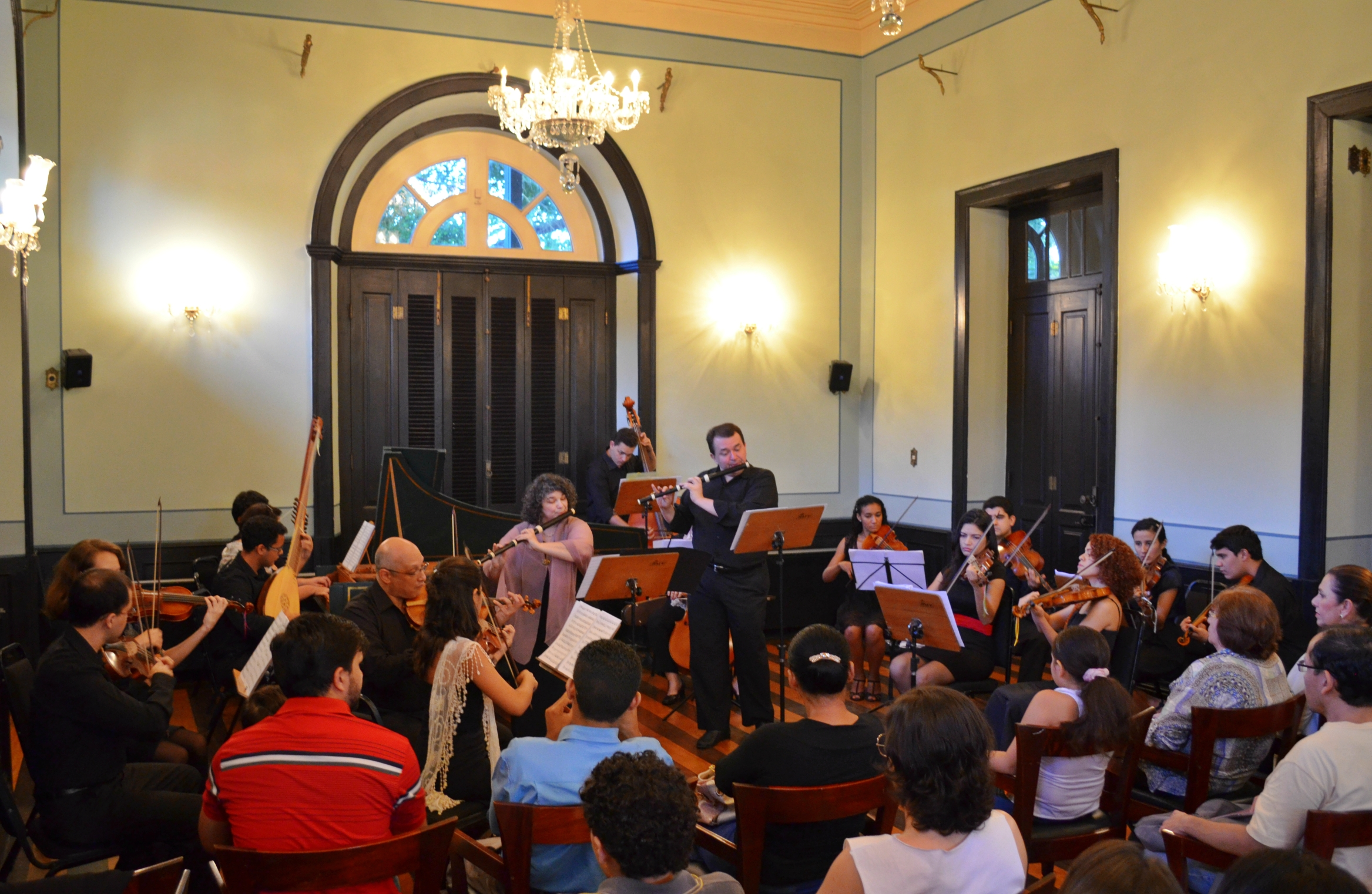
Orchestra playing inside the palace

In 1995 the government of the state of Amazonas transformed the palace into a museum, telling the story of rubber in the Amazon region, and an important center of cultural events for the city of Manaus.

== See also ==
- Amazon Theatre
- Mercado Adolpho Lisboa
- Amazon rubber boom
- Provincial Palace
