= Ajuricaba (chief) =

18th century Manaos leader

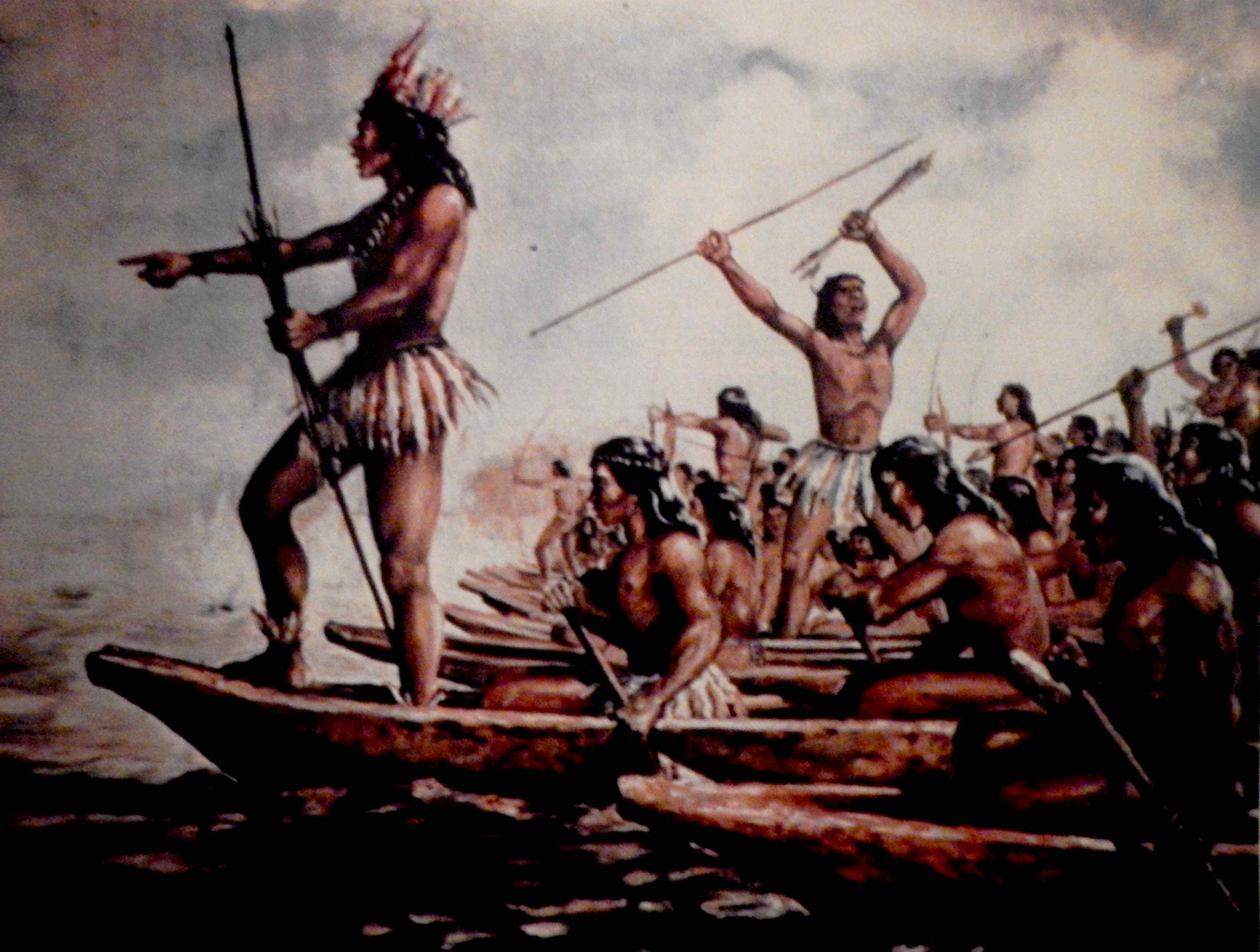
- Portrait of Chief Ajuricaba leading warriors against invading Portuguese forces
- Born: c. Aldeia de Mariuá (today Barcelos, Amazonas)
- Died: c. 1728, Amazon River
- Occupation: Indigenous leadership

Ajuricaba (born in Aldeia de Mariuá, today Barcelos, Amazonas – c. 1728) was an 18th-century leader of the Manaos indigenous nation in the Brazilian Amazon. He led a rebellion against Portuguese colonizers, refusing to submit to slavery, and became a symbol of indigenous resistance and freedom.

Born in the Amazon rainforest, Ajuricaba spent several years away from his tribe but returned following the murder of his father by invading forces. Seeking revenge, he allied with the Dutch, who were enemies of Portugal, to carry out his plan. The Manaos had previously formed alliances with the Dutch in Guyana. In a bold act challenging Portuguese authority, Ajuricaba reportedly carried a Dutch flag in his canoe.

The Portuguese feared that his resistance would inspire other indigenous groups and enslaved Africans to revolt, potentially enabling a Dutch invasion of the Amazon River valley or sparking a widespread uprising against the Portuguese Crown. This threat prompted a military campaign known as the "guerra justa" (just war).

== Biography ==
Ajuricaba's origins are unclear, it is believed that he was born in the Rio Negro valley, in the region of Aldeia de Mariuá (today Barcelos, Brazil), possibly educated by Jesuit priests, many historians say that his war tactics were intelligent and that he was a good negotiator, to the point of forming a conglomerate of indigenous nations and forming trades with other Europeans in his neighborhood. It is not clear, the reasons for him to enter into direct conflict with the colonists, but possibly it was due to the death of his loved ones, mainly his father. Ajuricaba became known for being one of the indigenous leaders who fought against the slavery of his people and to deny to submit to slave labor, even winning the admiration of his enemies. Lusitanian chroniclers revealed that after his capture, possibly made by the betrayal of some of his allies, and taken to be jugged by the Portuguese court, he commanded a riot and committed suicide by throwing himself into the river.

== Background ==
At the end of the 17th century and the beginning of the 18th century, a smallpox epidemic severely affected the Amerindian populations along the Brazilian coast, drastically reducing the number of natives available for slave labor. This scarcity drove European settlers to penetrate deeper into the jungle to capture more indigenous people for enslavement during expeditions known as "descimentos" in the Amazon River valley. These missions occasionally involved armed incursions against tribes considered hostile to the settlers.

Increasingly frequent incursions were also carried out by so-called "rescue troops": expeditions aiming to free royal natives or those presumed to be enslaved by others. Contemporary reports indicate that contact with Europeans severely compromised not only the cultural identity but also the physical integrity of these indigenous groups, as they suffered from diseases to which they had no immunity.

During the 1723 campaign, colonizers encountered the Manaos people between the valleys of the Negro and Amazon rivers and regarded their presence as hostile. The then-governor of the province of Grão-Pará, João da Maia da Gama, sent the chronicler Belchior Mendes de Moraes to investigate these groups. Mendes reported to the governor that the hostile natives practiced cannibalism and incestuous relations, and were allied with the Dutch—Portugal’s enemies at the time. It is believed Mendes intended to alert both the church and King D. João V to the risk of insubordination, which he felt was being ignored by both.

A Lusitanian chronicler also reported that the natives were well-armed and employed tactics resembling modern guerrilla warfare, using firearms and cannons. Mendes identified the leader of the Manaos people as Ajuricaba, a name meaning gathering of bees.

== Honors ==
The city of Manaus, located in the Brazilian Amazon, was named in honor of the Manaos natives, the indigenous tribe to which Ajuricaba belonged.

His name is also honored by the city of Ajuricaba, located in the interior of the State of Rio Grande do Sul.

Several other places across Brazil, especially in the Amazon region, are named after Ajuricaba.

== See also ==
- Slavery among the indigenous peoples of the Americas
- Atlantic slave trade to Brazil
- Manaus
