= Free Economic Zone of Manaus =

Brazilian industrial zone

The Free Economic Zone of Manaus (Portuguese: Zona Franca de Manaus, Portuguese pronunciation: [ˈzõnɐ ˈfɾɐ̃kɐ dʒi mɐˈnaws] - ZFM) is a free economic zone in the city of Manaus, the capital of the State of Amazonas, Northern Brazil. The initial idea, a free trade port in Manaus, came from Deputy Francisco Pereira da Silva and was subsequently formalized by Law No. 3.173 on June 6, 1957. The project was approved by the National Congress on October 23, 1951 under No. 1.310 and regulated by Decree No. 47.757 on February 2, 1960. It was then amended by rapporteur Maurício Jopper, engineer, who by agreement with the original author, justified the creation of a free economic zone instead of a free trade port.

For the first ten years the ZFM (Manaus Free Trade Zone) was located in a warehouse rented from Manaus Harbour, in the Port of Manaus, and relied on federal funds. It was perhaps due to this lack of its own resources that there was little credibility in the project.

On February 28, 1967, President Castello Branco signed Decree-Law No. 288, whose draft accompanied the Exposition of Motives. Decree-Law No. 288 amended the provisions of Law No. 3.173/57 and redefined the Manaus Free Trade Zone in more concrete terms. The new Decree-Law stipulated that the Manaus Free Trade Zone would have an area of 10,000 km^{2} (3,900 sq mi) with an industrial centre as well as an agricultural center and that these would be given the economic means to allow for regional development in order to lift the Amazon out of the economic isolation that it had fallen into at that time. Decree No. 61.244 of August 28, 1967 created the Manaus Free Trade Zone Superintendence, SUFRAMA, an autarchy with its own legal status and assets and having financial and administrative autonomy.

Tax incentives and the subsequent complementary legislation created comparative advantages in the region with respect to other parts of the country and as a result the Manaus Free Trade Zone attracted new investment to the area. These incentives constituted tax exemptions administered federally by SUFRAMA and SUDAM.
