= Mercado Adolpho Lisboa =

Adolpho Lisboa Market
- Mercado Adolpho Lisboa
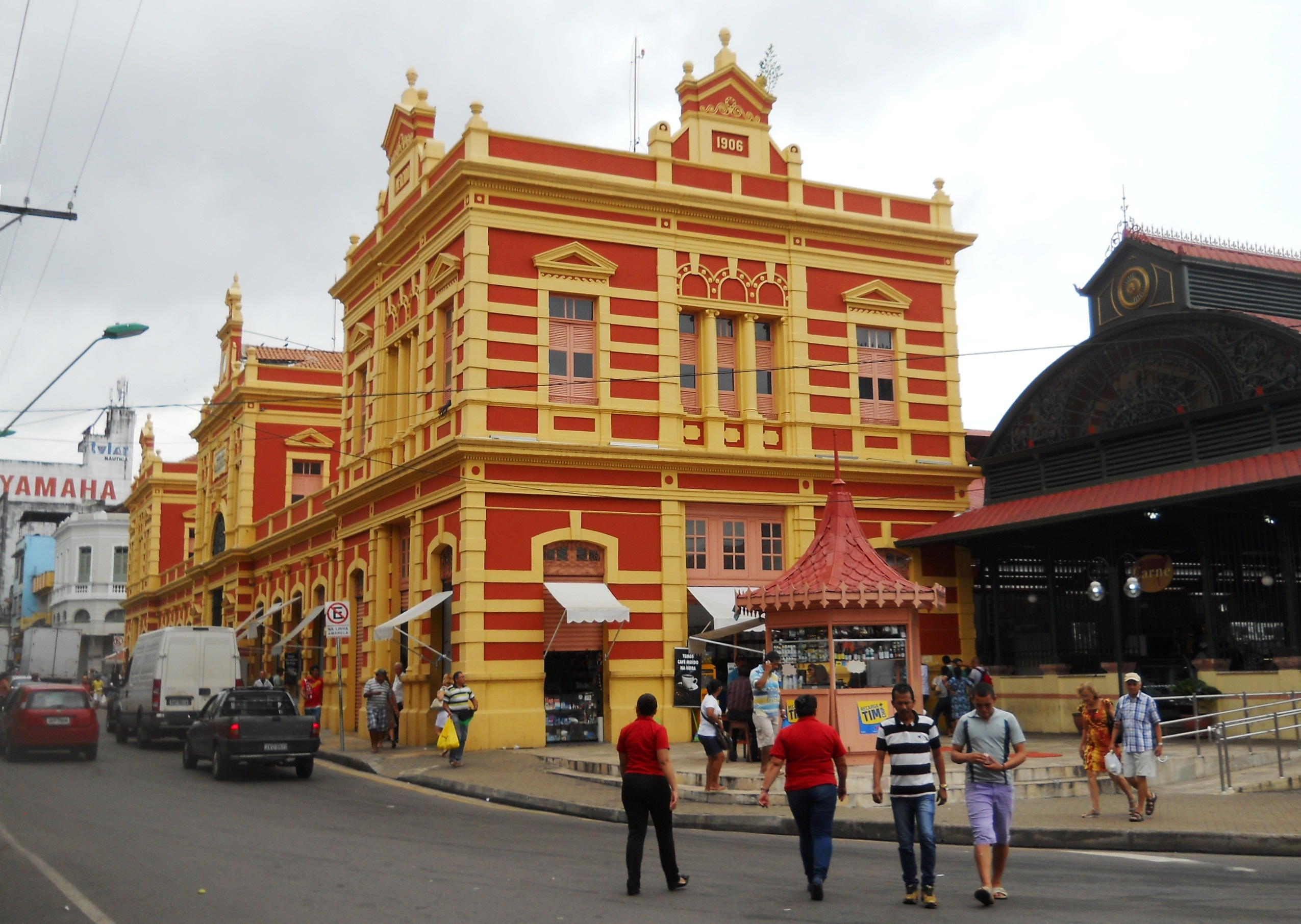
- Main facade of the Adolpho Lisboa Market
- Interactive map of the Adolpho Lisboa Market area

General information
- Type: Market
- Location: Manaus, Brazil
- Coordinates: 3°8′23.8416″S 60°1′22.8″W
- Construction started: 1880
- Inaugurated: 1883
- Owner: City of Manaus

National Historic Heritage of Brazil
- Designated: 1987
- Reference no.: 1179-T-1985

The Mercado Adolpho Lisboa, also called Mercado Municipal or Mercadão (big market), is a marketplace located in Manaus, Brazil. It lies on the shore of the Rio Negro. The market was constructed between 1880 and 1883. The building was based on the Les Halles marketplace of Paris, France. The building's metallic structures were built in Paris and sent to Manaus by ship. It has two completely different facades, one facing the Rio Negro and the other facing the public road. An important historical and architectural building of the city, the Municipal Market also stands out today as a cultural and tourist center. The market is one of the largest open markets in the city of Manaus, offering fresh fruits, spices, fish, souvenirs, traditional indigenous medications and among other products. The building was interdicted in 2006 for restoration works and was delivered after seven years on October 23, 2013.

== History ==
In the nineteenth century, concerns about the hygienic conditions of food marketing created the need to build public markets in several cities, such as Manaus. According to records of the time, the name "Adolpho Lisboa" is the same name of the mayor who administered the city of Manaus in that period. The central pavilion was inaugurated, on July 15, 1883, by the president of the Province, José Paranaguá, at a time when the city of Manaus was experiencing the rubber boom. The market was built in Art Nouveau style, following the characteristics of the old market Les Halles, of Paris, France. Around 1908, an iron pavilion was built for the commercialization, in that time of Amazonian spices, of which it had kerosene lighting and following the same architectural style of the main building. From that time the main building was dated, being a shed of approximately 45 meters of length and 42 meters of width, constructed with iron structure. The structure is supported by 28 columns, being the parapets where these lean, and the two side rooms, in masonry of stone and brick. The side rooms have twenty "boxes", separated from each other, by iron grills each having wooden counters, with marble top. In 1890, two other equally sized side pavilions (sheds) were built, also with iron structures and zinc roofs.

== Structure ==
The market is divided into two pavilions, the first and oldest is made of masonry, the second is composed of iron, the Amazon region at that time had an almost unexplored soil and an insufficient amount of raw material, this motivated the importation almost all materials of the building from Europe, as was the second pavilion which had the entire structure built by Walter Macfarlane of Glasgow. It is said that the structure was designed by Gustave Eiffel, but apparently this is just a legend. The Brazilian National Institute of Historical and Artistic Heritage listed on its website Bakus&Brisbit from Belén, Francis Morton Engineers from Liverpool and Walter Macfarlane from Glasgow as the authors of the constructions.

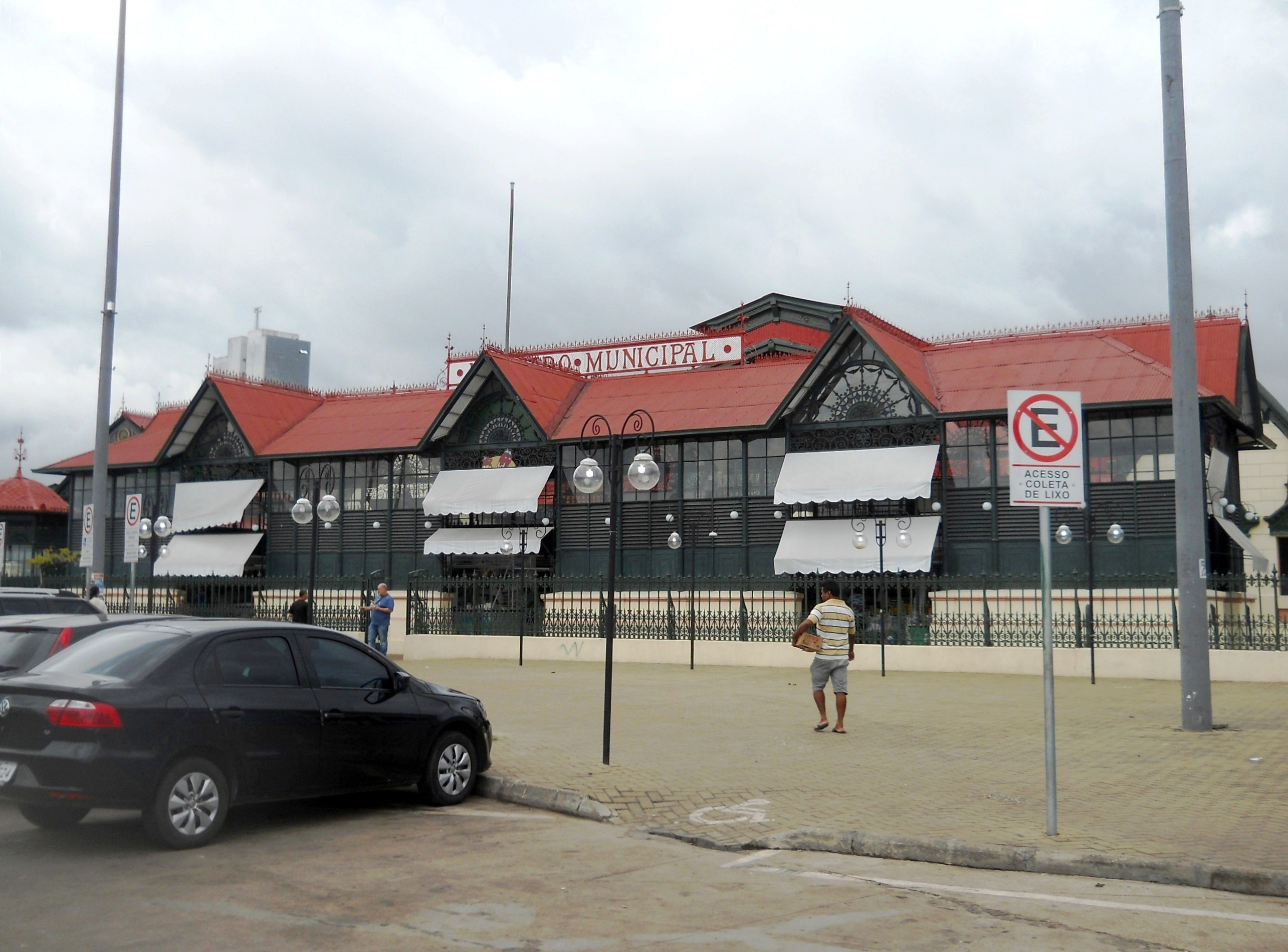
Secondary pavilion of Market. Known as iron market

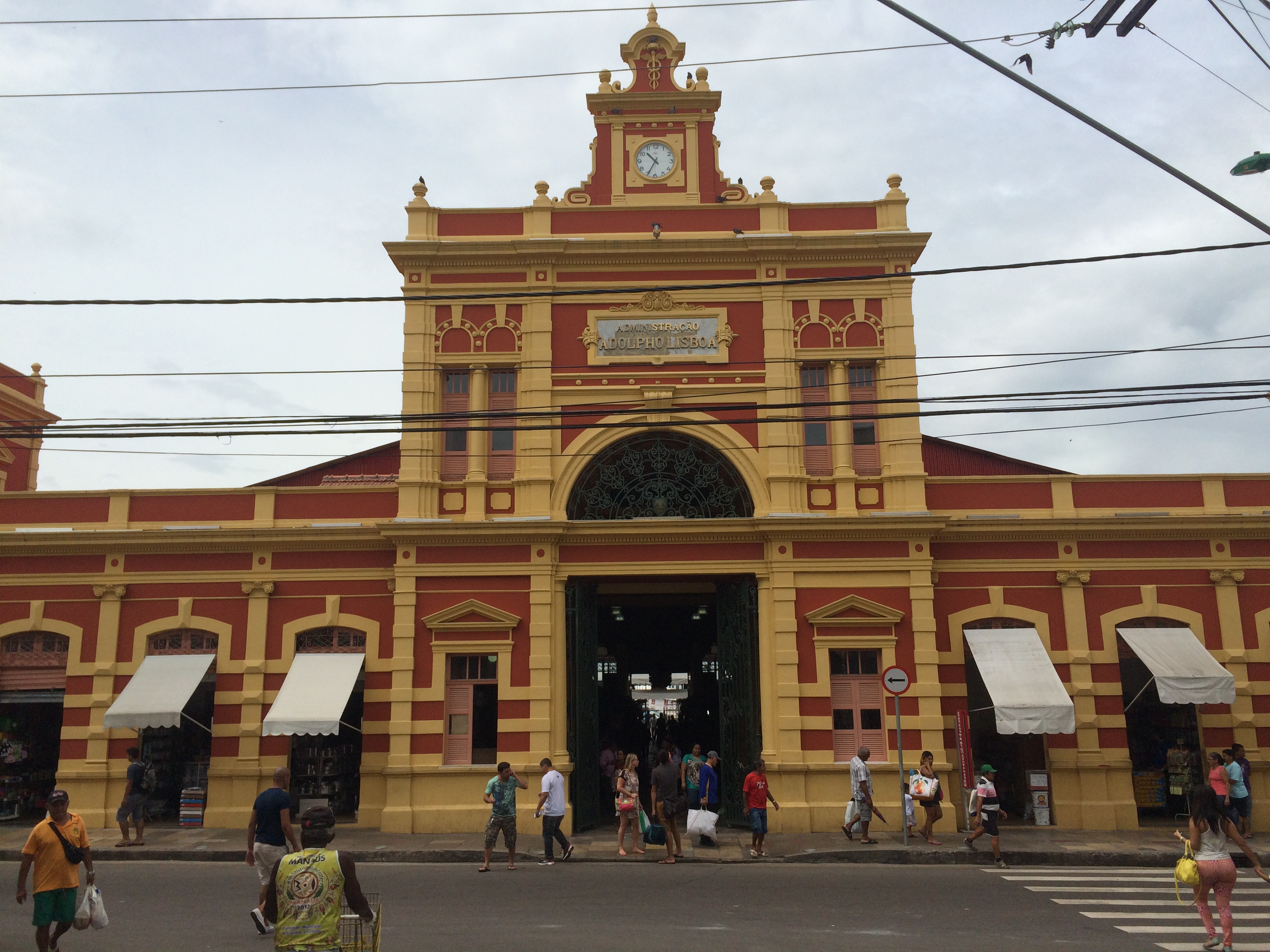
Main pavilion of market

== See also ==
- Benjamin Constant Bridge
