= List of festivals in South America =

Festivals of South America
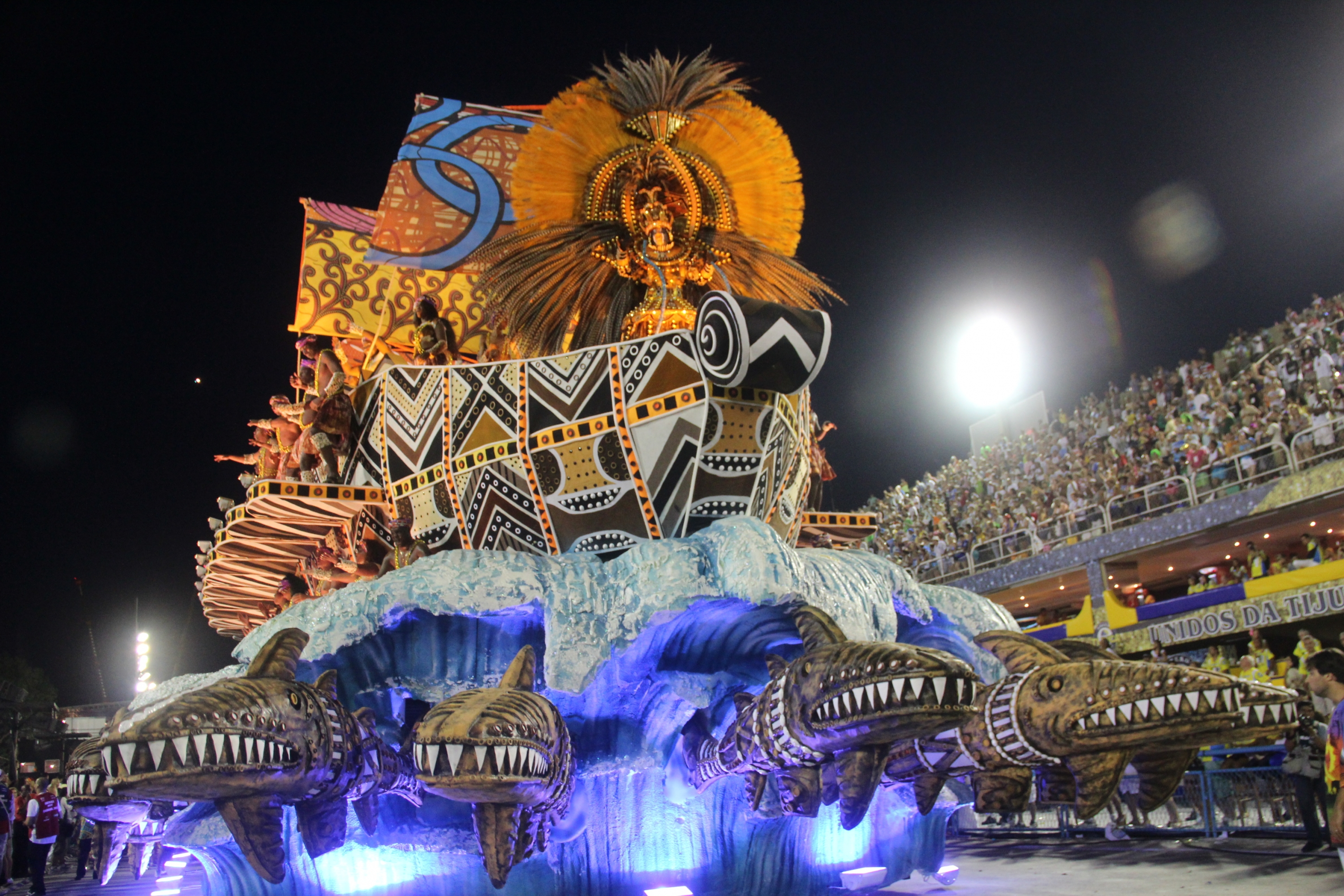
- Carnival float at the Brazilian Carnival in Rio de Janeiro, Brazil

General Information
- Subtopics: List of festivals, list of music festivals, list of film festivals
- Location: South America, The Caribbean
- Related topics: Culture of South America

The following is an incomplete list of festivals in South America, with links to separate lists by country and region where applicable. This list includes festivals of diverse types, including regional festivals, commerce festivals, film festivals, folk festivals, carnivals, pow wows, recurring festivals on holidays, and music festivals. Music festivals are annotated "(music)" for countries where there is not a dedicated music section.

This list overlaps with List of film festivals in South America.

== Sovereign states ==
=== Argentina ===
- Argentina Bicentennial
- Argentina Centennial
- Bicentennial of the flag of Argentina
- Encuentro Internacional de Escultura en Madera-Piedra-Hierro de Rosario
- Encuentro y Fiesta Nacional de Colectividades
- Festival Iberoamericano de Publicidad
- Festival Nacional del Cabrito
- Fiesta Nacional de la Vendimia
- Immigrant's Festival
- International Poetry Festival of Rosario
- Leyendas
- National Beer Festival
- National Day of the Sun
- National Sea Festival
- Sea Star Awards
- Septiembre Musical

==== Film festivals in Argentina ====
- Buenos Aires International Festival of Independent Cinema
- Buenos Aires Rojo Sangre
- Córdoba International Animation Festival – ANIMA
- Festival Latinoamericano de Video Rosario
- Mar del Plata International Film Festival

==== Music festivals in Argentina ====
- Buenos Aires Jazz Festival
- Cosquín Festival
- Cosquin Rock
- Creamfields BA
- Guitar Experience Festival
- Moonpark
- Pepsi Music Festival
- Personal Fest
- SAMC
- Semana Musical Llao Llao

=== Barbados ===
- Crop Over

=== Bolivia ===
- Life In Color Bolivia
- Road To Ultra Bolivia
- Carnival of Santa Cruz
- Corso Cruceño
- Festival de la Concordia
- Wayllunk'as de San Andrés
- La Paz Music Fest
- Bolivia Electrónica
- Tigo Music Fest
- Alasitas
- Pukllay
- Carnival of Oruro
- Madness Carnaval
- Open Air Music

=== Brazil ===
- Bauernfest
- Brazilian Beer Festival
- Carnaval
- Comic Con Experience
- Eastern European party
- Fenakiwi
- Festa da Uva
- Festa do Peão de Barretos
- Festa do Peão de Boiadeiro
- Festa junina
- Encontro de Cultura Huni Kuin
- Marejada
- MASP Antique Market
- Mixed Race Day
- Modern Art Week
- Natal Luz
- Oktoberfest of Blumenau
- Sarau
- Yamurikuma

==== Music festivals in Brazil ====
- Califórnia da Canção Nativa
- Chivas Jazz Festival
- Festival Amazonas de Ópera
- Hollywood Rock
- Maquinaria festival
- Planet Pop Festival
- Rock in Rio
- SWU Music & Arts
- Trocabrahma
- Virada Cultural

=== Chile ===
- Fiesta de La Tirana
- Santiago a Mil International Theater Festival
- Santiago International Book Fair
- Santiago International Film Festival (film)
- Valdivia International Film Festival (film)
- Viña del Mar International Film Festival (film)

==== Music festivals in Chile ====
- Frutillar Musical Weeks
- Lollapalooza Chile
- Mysteryland
- Piedra Roja
- Ultra Chile
- Viña del Mar International Song Festival

=== Colombia ===
- List of festivals in Colombia
  - List of festivals in La Guajira (region)
- Carnival in Colombia

=== Ecuador ===
- Fiestas de Quito
- Pachamama Raymi
- Quito Fest (music)
- Toro de fuego
- Mama Negra

=== Guyana ===
- Mashramani (music)
- Caribbean Festival of Arts

=== Paraguay ===
- Maquinaria festival (music)
- Paraguay Bicentennial
- Reggae Fest (music)
- Ypacaraí Festival

=== Peru ===
- Carnival of Conache
- Carnival of Huanchaco
- Ch'iyar Jaqhi (Cusco)
- Chukchu
- Competition of Paso Horses in Trujillo
- Día de la Canción Criolla
- Estamos en la Calle
- Fiesta de la Candelaria
- Gastronomic Fair in Trujillo (food)
- Great Military Parade of Peru
- Guaripola
- Independence Day of Trujillo
- International Ballet Festival of Trujillo (dance)
- International Festival of Lyric Singing (music)
- Inti Raymi
- Lima Film Festival (film)
- Lord of Huaman Festival
- Lord of Miracles
- Miss La Libertad
- Pachamama Raymi
- Quyllur Rit'i
- San José Festival
- T'anta Raymi
- Toro de fuego
- Tupay Tuqtu
- Trujillo Book Festival
- Trujillo Marinera Festival
- Trujillo Spring Festival
- Warachikuy
- Week anniversary of Trujillo Municipality
- Willka Raymi

=== Suriname ===
- Caribbean Festival of Arts

=== Uruguay ===
- Public holidays in Uruguay

=== Trinidad and Tobago ===
- Trinidad and Tobago Carnival
- Tobago Jazz Festival

=== Venezuela ===
- Paz Sin Fronteras (music)

== Dependencies and other territories ==
=== Falkland Islands ===
- Culture of the Falkland Islands

=== French Guiana ===
- Carnival in French Guiana

== See also ==
- List of festivals
- List of film festivals
- List of music festivals
- Category:Lists of festivals in South America
