= Ça Ira (opera) =

Studio album by Roger Waters
- Released: 26 September 2005
- Recorded: 2 December 1988 – 29 August 2005
- Genre: Classical; opera
- Length: 108:29
- Label: Sony Classical
- Producer: Roger Waters; Rick Wentworth

Roger Waters chronology
Flickering Flame: The Solo Years Volume 1 (2002)	Ça Ira (2005)	Roger Waters: The Wall (2015)

Roger Waters studio chronology
Amused to Death (1992)	Ça Ira (2005)	Is This the Life We Really Want? (2017)

Professional ratings
Review scores
Source	Rating
AllMusic	3/5 stars
Rolling Stone	3/5 stars

Ça Ira (French for "It will be all right", subtitled "There is Hope") is an opera by Roger Waters. It comes in three acts and is a concept album. The album is based on the French libretto co-written by Étienne and Nadine Roda-Gil on the historical subject of the early French Revolution. Ça Ira was released 26 September 2005, as a double CD album featuring baritone Bryn Terfel, soprano Ying Huang, and tenor Paul Groves. The album received mixed reviews, with critics praising the composition but criticising its plot and simplicity.

== History ==
Waters, known for his work in the English rock band Pink Floyd, was approached by friends Étienne Roda-Gil and his wife Nadine Delahaye in 1987, and asked to set their libretto to music. The initial version was completed and recorded by the end of 1988. On hearing it, an impressed François Mitterrand urged the Paris Opera to stage it for the bicentennial of the revolution the following July. The opera directors, however, were resistant. "It foundered on French chauvinism," Waters suggested. "The idea of an English bass player from a pop group creating something they might use in their celebrations stuck in the Gallic craw." Starting in 1989, Waters rewrote the libretto in English.

== Critical reaction ==
Ça Ira has received mixed reviews. The biggest criticisms were that the opera is too narrative, which makes staging very difficult – and, as a result, disrupts the flow of the piece. Others have complained that the score is too conventional and that Waters should have taken more risks with it.

== Performances ==
The first time any part of Ça Ira was heard in public was on 16 October 2002 when the Overture was performed live at the Royal Albert Hall in London by the Royal Philharmonic Concert Orchestra, during a benefit gala for the Countryside Alliance.

The next public airing (not a live performance, but a recording played through a sound system) took place in Malta on 1 May 2004, the night that Malta entered the European Union. An approximately 15-minute-long excerpt was heard by 80,000 people present at the waterfront of the Grand Harbour. The music was accompanied by a light show by Gert Hoff.

The official premiere took place in Rome on 17 November 2005, in front of a sold-out crowd, and was followed the next evening by another performance. Both shows were praised for the high quality of music, vocal performances, and sound. The choir, orchestra, and soloists were complemented by a projection screen backdrop which displayed images (some photographed by Mark Holthusen), helping to tell the story.

A full operatic performance took place on 25 August 2006 in Poznań, Poland, and was televised live on Poland's TVP. The project involved the same number of musicians from the concert performances in addition to more than 200 dancers from the Great Theatre in Poznań. There were also period elements of stage design (such as horses, carriages and war scenes with soldiers and stunt performers) and full costumes. Over 500 artists were involved, and the production reportedly cost in excess of €2 million. Performances were held in Kyiv on 16 December, and at the Poznań Opera House on 30 and 31 December 2006.

In April 2008, the opera was performed, with the libretto in English, as part of the Festival Amazonas de Ópera in Manaus, Brazil by the Amazonas Philharmonic Orchestra and choir.

=== Dates ===
Date	City	Country	Venue	Ref.
16 October 2002	London	England	Royal Albert Hall (Overture only; benefit for Countryside Alliance)	
17 & 18 November 2005	Rome	Italy	Auditorium Parco della Musica	
26 August 2006	Poznań	Poland	Poznań International Fair Grounds	
16 December 2006	Kyiv	Ukraine	International Expo Congress Center	
30 December 2006 – 9 March 2007 (7 performances)	Poznań	Poland	Poznań Opera House	
15 – 24 April 2008 (3 performances)	Manaus	Brazil	Amazonas Theatre (Amazonas Opera Festival)	
5 May 2008	Den Haag	Netherlands	World Forum Theatre	
17 November 2010	Rotterdam	Netherlands	Nieuwe Luxor Theater	
2 – 9 May 2013 (4 performances)	São Paulo	Brazil	São Paulo Municipal Theatre	
13 August 2013	Gothenburg	Sweden	Götaplatsen (Gothenburg Culture Festival)	
30 January 2015	Nashville	USA	Schermerhorn Symphony Center	

== Recordings ==
The 2005 release was available in three formats:

- A three-disc set with regular CD and Super Audio (SACD) stereo and Dolby Digital 5.1 Surround Sound versions. Disc 3 was a DVD with a 55-minute documentary by Adrian Maben, showing Waters at work on the opera. This also included a 60-page book with libretto and credits, and illustrations by Nadine Roda-Gil.
- A two-disc set with regular audio CDs, including libretto and illustrations in CD-ROM format.
- A two-disc set in the original French.

"I have no idea how many people it will appeal to," Waters remarked. "There's no way it's going to appeal to people in the [same] way [as] Dark Side of the Moon. It's a different animal. I'd like to say I don't care, but obviously I do." In the event, the album spent 14 weeks on Billboard's Classical Chart in the United States and peaked at number 5.

=== Track listing: Disc one ===
1. The Gathering Storm – 1:38
2. Overture – 4:06

==== Act 1 ====
3. Scene 1: A Garden in Vienna 1765 – 0:53
4. "Madame Antoine, Madame Antoine" – 2:53
5. Scene 2: Kings Sticks and Birds – 2:41
6. "Honest Bird, Simple Bird" – 2:10
7. "I Want to Be King" – 2:37
8. "Let Us Break All the Shields" – 1:45
9. Scene 3: The Grievances of the People – 4:40
10. Scene 4: France in Disarray – 2:34
11. "To Laugh is to Know How to Live" – 1:44
12. "Slavers, Landlords, Bigots at Your Door" – 3:36
13. Scene 5: The Fall of the Bastille – 1:34
14. "To Freeze in the Dead of Night" – 2:19
15. "So to the Streets in the Pouring Rain" – 4:17

==== Act 2 ====
16. Scene 1: Dances and Marches – 2:11
17. "Now Hear Ye!" – 2:18
18. "Flushed With Wine" – 4:31
19. Scene 2: The Letter – 1:39
20. "My Dear Cousin Bourbon of Spain" – 2:48
21. "The Ship of State is All at Sea" – 1:46
22. Scene 3: Silver Sugar and Indigo – 0:55
23. "To The Windward Isles" – 4:50
24. Scene 4: The Papal Edict – 1:17
25. "In Paris There's a Rumble Under the Ground" – 6:19

=== Track listing: Disc two ===
==== Act 3 ====
1. Scene 1: The Fugitive King – 2:21
2. "But the Marquis of Boulli Has a Trump Card Up His Sleeve" – 4:27
3. "To Take Your Hat Off" – 2:40
4. "The Echoes Never Fade from That Fusillade" – 3:15
5. Scene 2: The Commune de Paris – 2:43
6. "Vive la Commune de Paris" – 3:16
7. "The National Assembly is Confused" – 2:41
8. Scene 3: The Execution of Louis Capet – 1:39
9. "Adieu Louis for You It's Over" – 3:45
10. Scene 4: Marie Antoinette – The Last Night on Earth – 1:39
11. "Adieu My Good and Tender Sister" – 5:09
12. Scene 5: Liberty – 2:51
13. "And in the Bushes Where They Survive" – 6:52

== Charts and certifications ==
=== Charts ===
Chart (2006)	Peak position
Polish Albums (ZPAV)	12

=== Certifications ===
Region	Certification	Certified units/sales
Poland (ZPAV)	Platinum	20,000^{*}
^{*} Sales figures based on certification alone.
