= Amazonas Philharmonic =

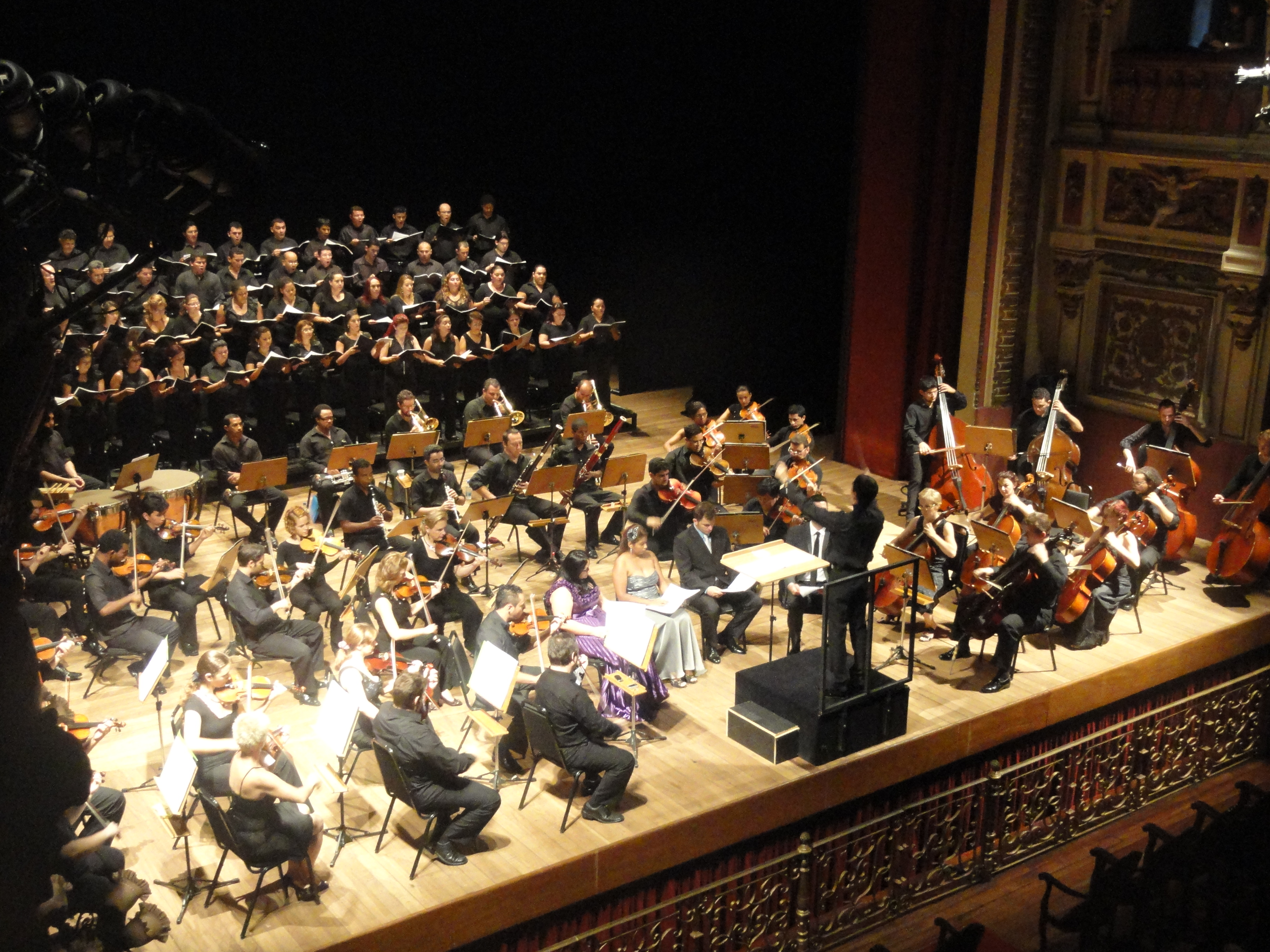
The Amazonas Philharmonic in 2011

The Amazonas Philharmonic (Portuguese: Amazonas Filarmônica) is a professional orchestra of the Amazonas (Brazilian state), headquartered in Manaus, and was founded on September 26, 1997, by Julio Medaglia. The orchestras Lead Conductor (Regente Titular) is Luiz Fernando Malheiro, and the Assistant Conductor and Artistic Director is Marcelo de Jesus. The Amazonas Philharmonic orchestra rehearses and performs concerts at the Amazon Theatre (a well known theater in the city of Manaus).

The Philharmonic is the official orchestra of the Festival Amazonas de Ópera (which is held every year from March until May). In 2011 the orchestra completed their 15th consecutive year of the festival. The logo of the orchestra (a lily-pad superscript of "Amazonas Philharmonic") was created by Hans Donner, known designer of Rede Globo (a major Brazilian television network). In April 2008, the opera, "Ça Ira" by Roger Waters (from the musical group, Pink Floyd) was performed in Brazil by the Amazonas Philharmonic, at the Teatro Amazonas. It was played for the opening of the XII Festival Amazonas de Ópera, with Luiz Fernando Malheiro conducting.

In January 2012, The Secretaria de Estado de Cultura (the secretary of culture for the state) launched the Turnê Mandaçaia (the Mandacaia concert tour). The Amazonas Philharmonic played in the cities of Maués, Boa Vista do Ramos, Barreirinha, Parintins, and Urucará; All located within the Amazon rainforest in Amazonas (Brazilian state).

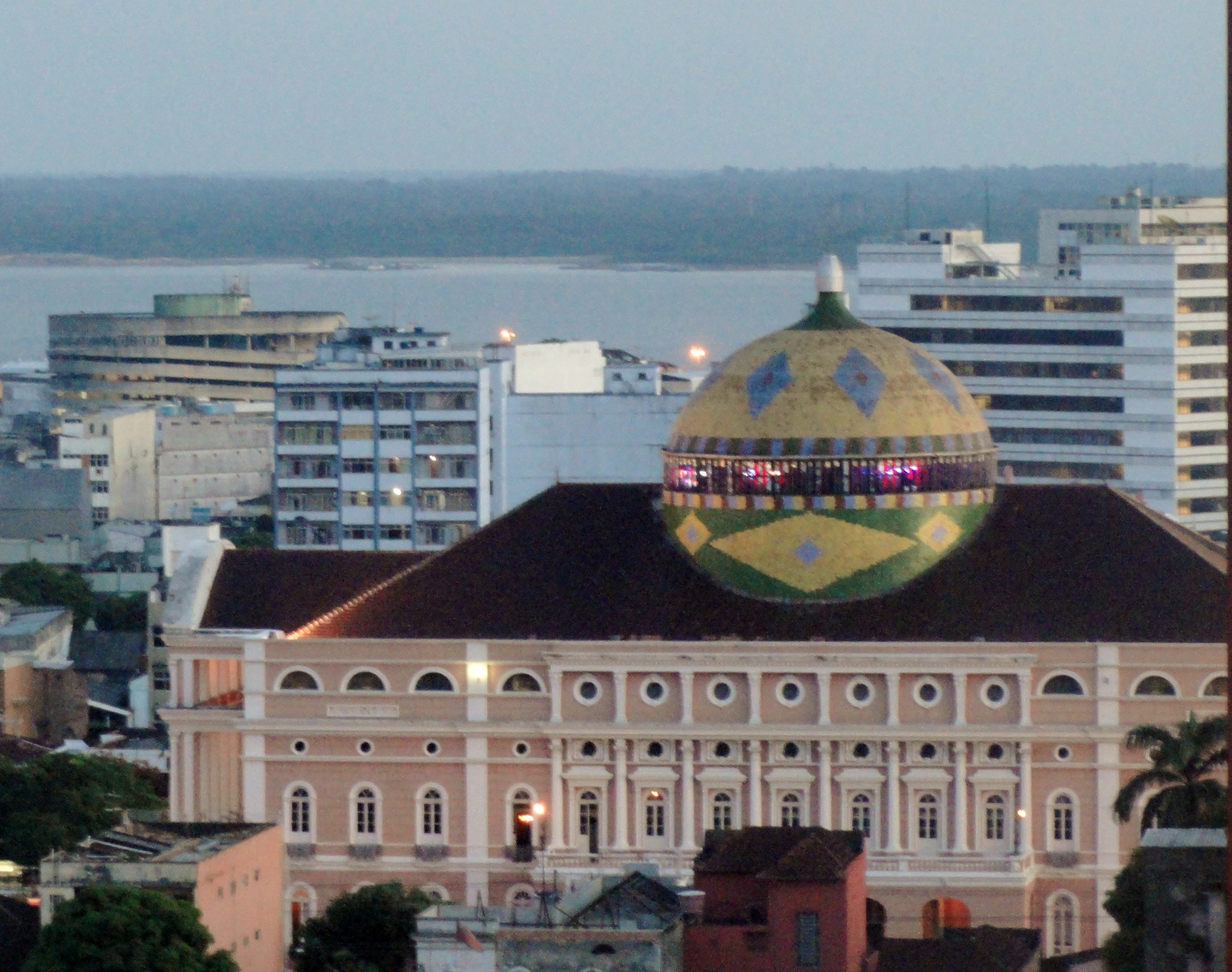
O Teatro Amazonas in Manaus, Brazil

== See also ==
- List of symphony orchestras
