= International Festival of Lyric Singing =

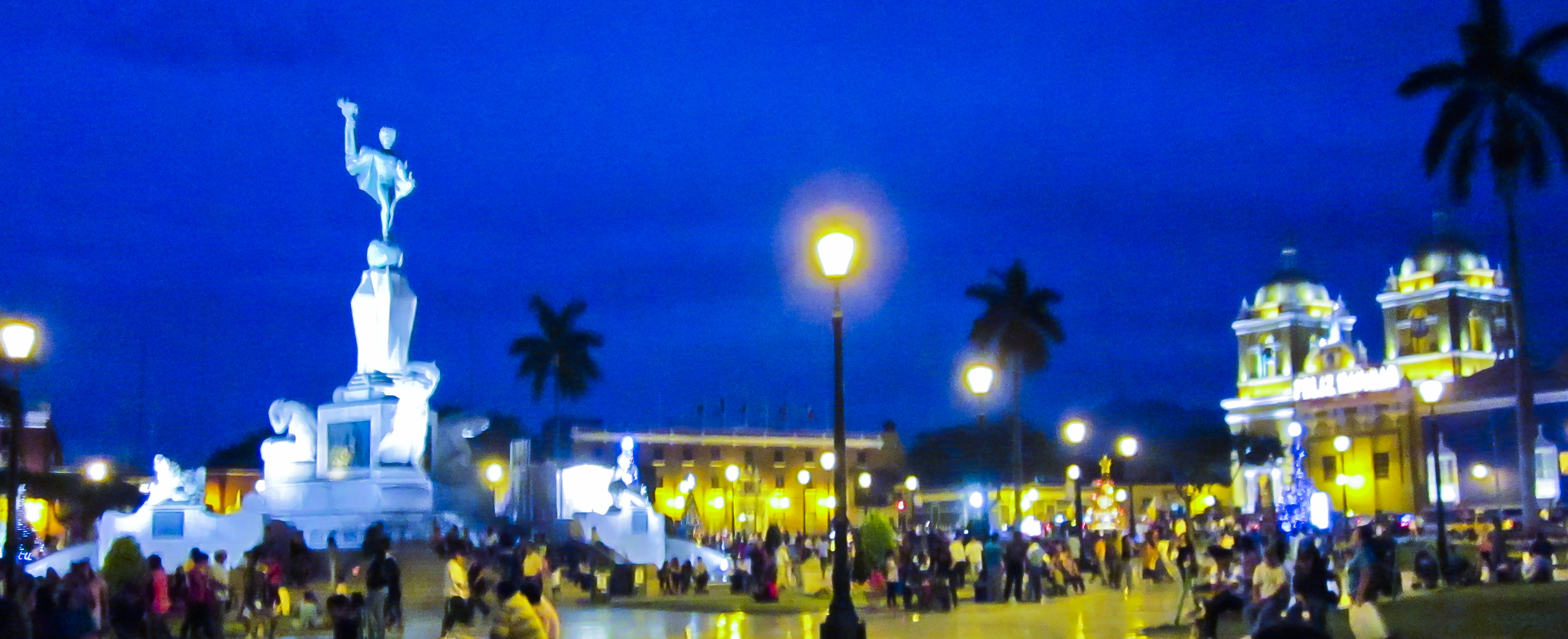
- Trujillo Main Square
- Genre: Classical music
- Location: Trujillo city
- Years active: 1996 - present
- Website: http://www.concursocantotrujillo.org/

The Festival of Lyric Singing is an international festival held in the Peruvian city of Trujillo. This festival takes place in November of every year and it is a competition of singers from several countries. In 2011 the 15th edition of this festival took place.

== Description ==
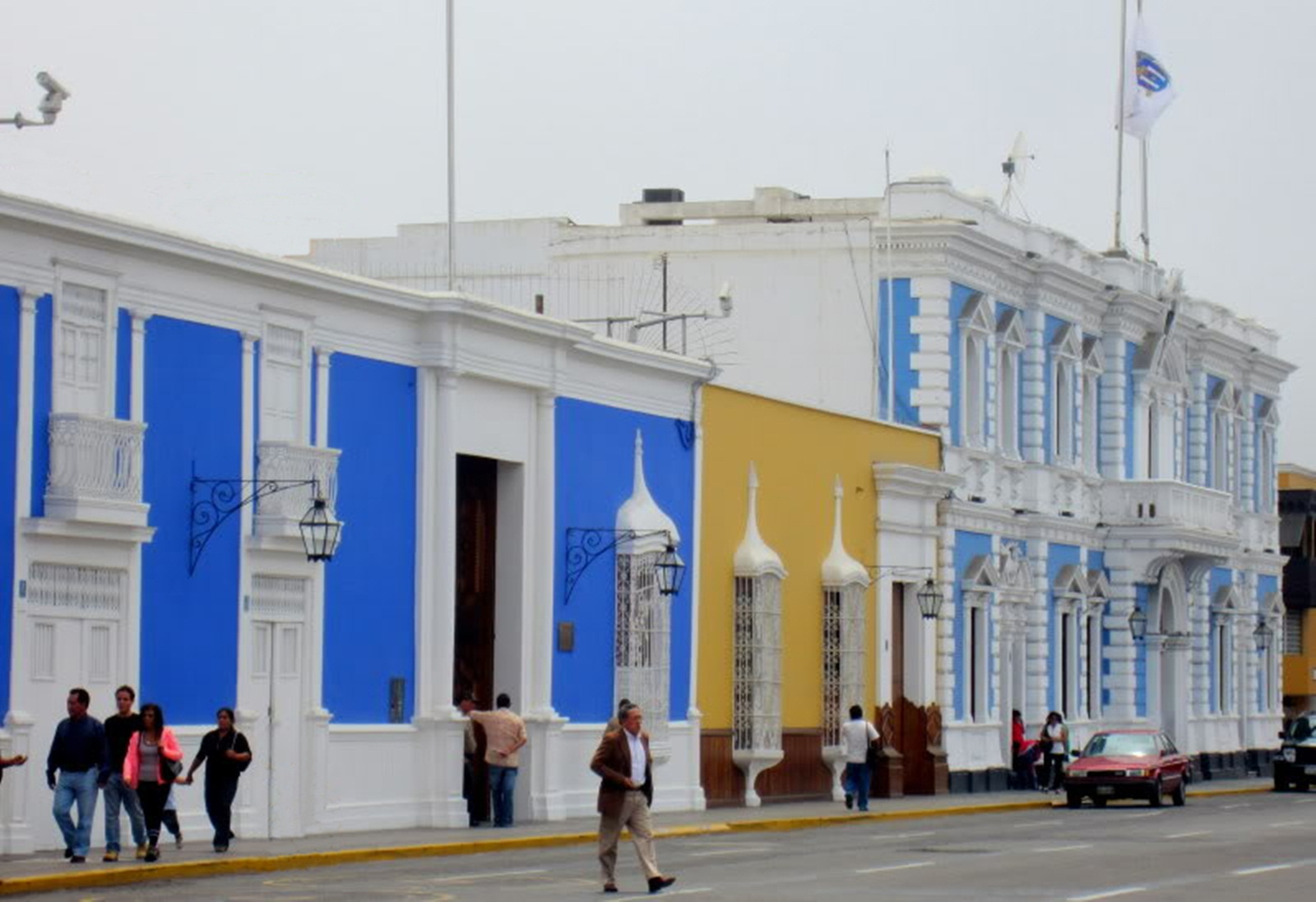
In the Historic Centre of Trujillo takes place the International Festival of Lyric Singing, it is seen the Municipal palace of the city

This event features singers international exponents of the lyric mainly from Americas, Asia and Europe, in addition have the presence of teachers and international pianists, It is organized by the Cultural Promotion Center of Trujillo, and it takes place in the Municipal theater of the city during the month of November.

=== Winners ===
Edition	Singer	Country	Year
XIII	Ramón Centeno	Cuba	2009

== See also ==
- List of classical music festivals in South America
- List of festivals in Peru
- Trujillo
- Marinera Festival
- Trujillo Spring Festival
- Las Delicias beach
- Huanchaco
- Santiago de Huamán
- Victor Larco Herrera District
