= Júlio Medaglia =

Brazilian composer, arranger, and conductor

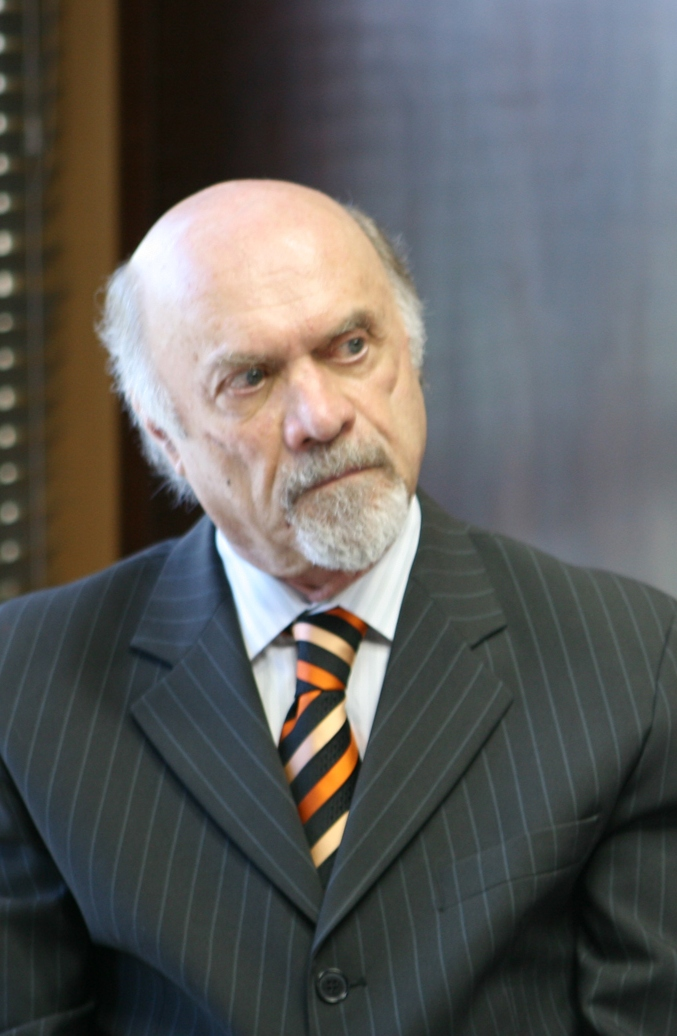
Conductor Júlio Medaglia in 2010.

Júlio Medaglia (born 1938) is a Brazilian composer, arranger, and conductor. Born in São Paulo, he studied theory and conducting with Hans-Joachim Koellreutter. He continued his studies at the Musikhochschule in Freiburg, Germany, and privately with Pierre Boulez, Karlheinz Stockhausen, and Sir John Barbirolli, with whom he worked as assistant conductor.

After his return to Brazil in 1966, he established a solid reputation as a conductor, eventually working with all the major orchestras in the country, in addition to launching his career as arranger and composer of music for film and theater. In 1970, he worked with conductor Günther Schuller in the U.S., and returned for another period of study in Germany, during which he produced several arrangements of Brazilian popular music and composed more than 100 scores for German television movies.

Returning to Brazil in 1974, since then he has worked with several musical and cultural institutions in the country, in addition to contributing the soundtrack for hundreds of Brazilian movies, plays, and television programs. Among the institutions that he has directed are the Teatro Municipal in Rio de Janeiro, the Orquestra Sinfônica do Teatro Municipal in Brasília, and the Festival de Inverno de Campos do Jordão in São Paulo.

He was the artistic adviser for the Rede Globo, the largest TV network in Brazil, and is the founder and director of the Amazonas Filarmônica, the resident orchestra at the Teatro Amazonas in Manaus.

He also made the orchestration of Festivals of the MPB of Rede Record.

He wrote his "Belle Epoque en Sud-America", a Suite for Wind Quintet for the Bläserquintett of the Berlin Philharmonic, who have recorded the work and play it on tour. The piece consists of El Porsche Negro, a Tango; Traumreise nach Attersee, subtitled Vals Paulista; and Requinta Maluca, a Chorinho.
