= Maycown Reichembach =

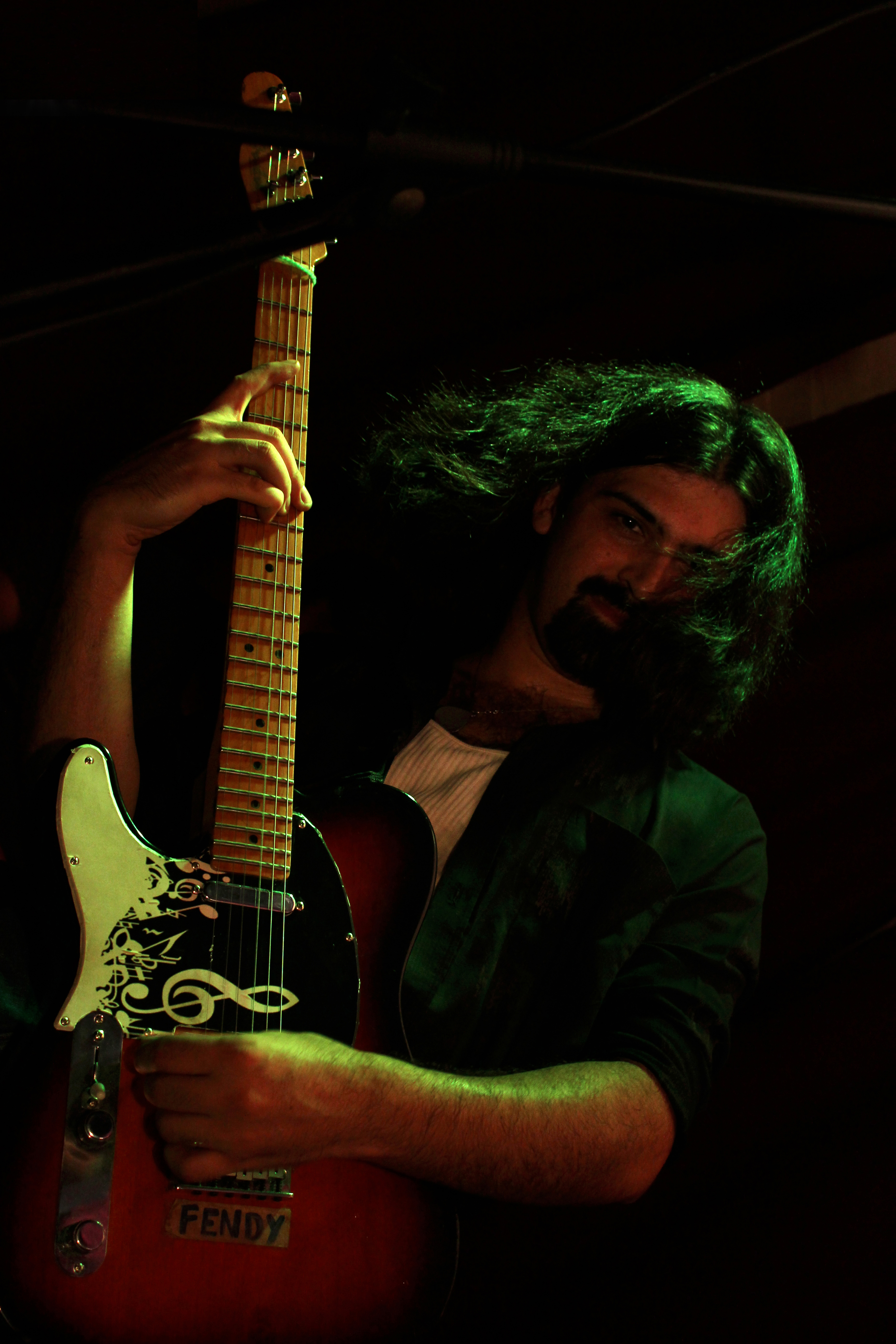

Background information
- Birth name: Maycown Christian Reichembach
- Born: December 30, 1982 (age 42); Paso de los libres, Corrientes, Argentina
- Genres: Jazz fusion, instrumental rock
- Occupation(s): Musician, guitarist, pianist, composer, arranger, musical transcriber
- Instrument: Guitar
- Website: Official homepage, Spanish homepage, Portuguese homepage

Maycown Reichembach is an Argentine guitarist. He is also a pianist, composer, arranger and musical transcriber. He is the creator of the largest electric guitar festival in Argentina, called "Guitar Experience".

== Career ==
Reichembach was born on December 30, 1982, in Paso de los libres, Corrientes, Argentina. When he was a child, Maycown took piano and acoustic guitar lessons; but at the age of 11, he chose the electric guitar.

In 1994, Reichembach was the winner of the singing contest Cantomanía Infantil, among 80 participants.

From 1996 to 1998, Maycown created his first blues and rock trio called Odyssey, with Iván Colunga (bass) and Iván Altamirano (drums).

Finally he studied music at Faculdade Souza Lima – 1º International Music College of Brazil (São Paulo) with exclusive partnership with Berklee College of Music-. Kiko Loureiro, Lupa Santiago, Joe Moghrabi and Ciro Visconti were his teachers at this education center.

Maycown plays guitar using the 8 fingers' technique, that consists on performing arpeggios with both hands. When a hand executes an arpeggio pattern, the other hand, does another, creating a high speed jazz- fusion sound.

His guitar talent is well known not only by specialized press like Guitar Player, Cover Guitarra, Guitar Class, but also by colleagues as Steve Vai, Greg Howe, Kiko Loureiro. His musical influences comes from funk, rock music (Jimi Hendrix, Led Zeppelin, Steve Vai, Joe Satriani, Shawn Lane), jazz (John Coltrane, Charlie Parker, Pat Metheny), and classical music (Johann Sebastian Bach, Wolfgang Amadeus Mozart, Ludwig van Beethoven, Maurice Ravel, Igor Stravinsky and Claude Debussy).

He has shared stage with international celebrities such as drummer Mannys Monteiro (Jaco Pastorius), bass player Arthur Maia (Djavan, Gilberto Gil, Ivan Lins), Kiko Loureiro (Angra), Greg Howe (Michael Jackson, Enrique Iglesias, Justin Timberlake), bass player Stu Hamm (Joe Satriani, Steve Vai, Frank Gambale), Guinga, Guillermo Zarba among others.

Between 2008 and 2010, Maycown was the Machaca Böffe's guitarist, an Argentine band that mixes different styles from rock funk, alternative pop, up to canzonetta.

In 2007, Maycown Reichembach's band – with Maycown (guitar), Gustavo Meli (drums), Andrés Pelican (bass), Mauro Laiolo (Hammond) – was chosen as guest band for Greg Howe's tour in Argentina, promoting his Sound Proof's album in Buenos Aires and Rosario.

In Argentina, he is the creator and performer of the Guitar Experience Festival, the biggest electronic guitar's exhibition of the country, whose fifth edition took place in Buenos Aires in April 2013. The Guitar Experience Festival consists of two or three shows of professionals of various genres from different Latin American countries. Some of the guest musicians of previous editions were: Pat Tomaselli (Chile), Fernando Pareta (Argentina), Claudio Passamani (Brazil). The festival, is hosted by BA MÚSICA, Buenos Aires' Culture Secretary.

Reichembach is also the conductor and composer of the classical and popular music orchestra Maycown Reichembach & Micro Orquesta as well as several theater plays.

Most recently, he arranged and orchestrated two Guillermo Zarba´s pieces called “Libations” and “The Time Of Water” for the Symphony Orchestra of Rio de la Plata.

Currently Reichembach shows the new album "Awakening the Spirit World Tour". He is the Transcription Director at TTM Transcribí tu música – first Latin American company specialize in music transcriptions-, and also guitar, composition, arrangement, orchestration teacher.

== Instruments ==
Maycown is an endorsee of several musical instrument companies like DS PICKUPS, Vola, Fuhrmann, Sfarzo strings, Jake amps, Guitar wheel and Tritone Custom pedalboards and cabs.

== Discography ==
- 2001: Myself.
- 2005: Sea of Roses, Music Tape.
- 2010: Sometimes I think about love.
- 2012: Awakening the Spirit, Neworld Records.

The Awakening the Spirit album was recorded at REC (Buenos Aires), mastered by Mario Brauer (Luis Alberto Spinetta, Charly Garcia, Jota Quest, among others). The guest musicians are Andrés Pellican (bass) and Gustavo Meli, the first Latin American drummer who played all big festivals Modern Drummer Festival 2001 (Winner of the undiscovered drummer contest), Ultimate drummers Weekend Australia 2003, Montreal Drum Fest 2004.

Track Listing

1. "Akashic secret".
2. "Alquimia".
3. "Flying elephant".
4. "Prayer of my soul".
5. "Mental flow".
6. "Manipura Fire".
7. "Pampeano".
8. "Mate Dulce".
9. "Chiflado".
10. "Ángel Guardián de los secretos mágicos".
