= Farroupilha =

Municipality of Rio Grande do Sul, Brazil

Coordinates: 29°14′S 51°21′W

- O Município de Farroupilha
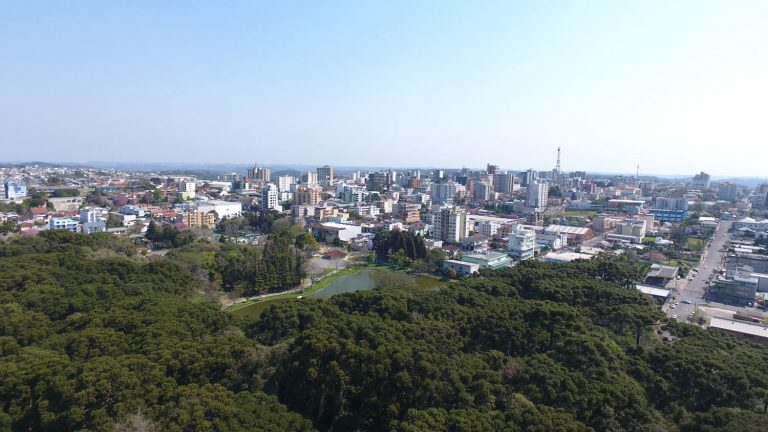
- View of Farroupilha

- Flag Coat of arms

- Location in Brazil
- Country: Brazil
- State: Rio Grande do Sul

Government
  - Mayor: Fabiano Feltrin

Population (2020)
  - Total: 73,061
- Time zone: UTC−3 (BRT)
- Area code: +55 54
- Website: Farroupilha, Rio Grande do Sul

Farroupilha is a city in Rio Grande do Sul, Brazil, in the Serra Gaúcha between the cities of Bento Gonçalves and Caxias do Sul. The city's total area is 359.3 km^{2}. Farroupilha has 73,061 residents (2020 estimate).

Farroupilha hosts an annual Festa Nacional do Kiwi (National Kiwifruit Festival) known as Fenakiwi. It is like the Festa da Uva in neighbor city Caxias do Sul,

== History ==
The area of Farroupilha was first settled in 1875 by three families (Stefano Crippa, Tomazo Radaelli, and Luigi Sperafico) that immigrated from Milan, Italy. The municipality of Farroupilha was officially created on 11 December 1934. The city was named "Farroupilha" after the Centennial anniversary of the Ragamuffin War that was celebrated in the subsequent year.

== Geography ==
=== Climate ===
Climate data for Farroupilha, elevation 680 m (2,230 ft), (1976–2005)
Month	Jan	Feb	Mar	Apr	May	Jun	Jul	Aug	Sep	Oct	Nov	Dec	Year
Mean daily maximum °C (°F)	27.3 (81.1)	27.0 (80.6)	25.7 (78.3)	22.6 (72.7)	19.5 (67.1)	17.4 (63.3)	17.6 (63.7)	18.9 (66.0)	20.1 (68.2)	22.4 (72.3)	24.4 (75.9)	26.4 (79.5)	22.4 (72.4)
Daily mean °C (°F)	21.6 (70.9)	21.7 (71.1)	20.4 (68.7)	17.3 (63.1)	14.3 (57.7)	12.5 (54.5)	12.4 (54.3)	13.5 (56.3)	14.7 (58.5)	16.9 (62.4)	18.6 (65.5)	20.6 (69.1)	17.0 (62.7)
Mean daily minimum °C (°F)	15.9 (60.6)	16.4 (61.5)	15.1 (59.2)	12.0 (53.6)	9.0 (48.2)	7.5 (45.5)	7.3 (45.1)	8.1 (46.6)	9.4 (48.9)	11.4 (52.5)	12.9 (55.2)	14.8 (58.6)	11.7 (53.0)
Average relative humidity (%)	75	78	86	83	82	83	82	78	79	78	76	79	80
Mean monthly sunshine hours	227	189	193	180	163	135	151	154	160	190	210	221	2,173
Source: Empresa Brasileira de Pesquisa Agropecuária (EMBRAPA)

== Twin towns – sister cities ==
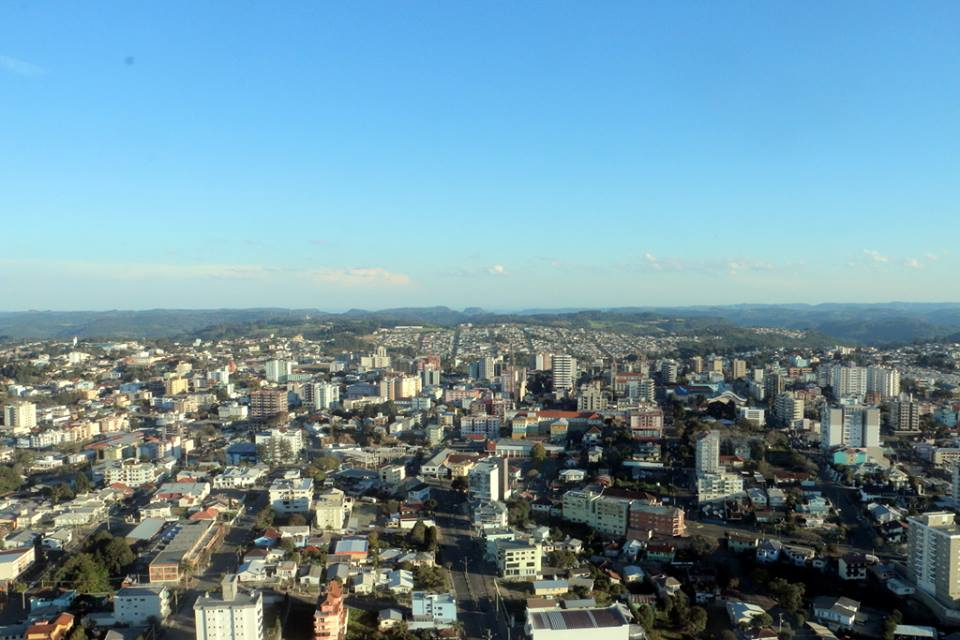
Farroupilha

Farroupilha is twinned with:

- Cadaval, Portugal
- Latina, Italy

== See also ==
- List of municipalities in Rio Grande do Sul
