= Fenakiwi =

Festival in Brazil

Fenakiwi or Festa Nacional do Kiwi (that is Portuguese for National Kiwi Fest) is a city celebration in the city of Farroupilha, Rio Grande do Sul, Brazil. Farroupilha is located in the Serra Gaúcha.

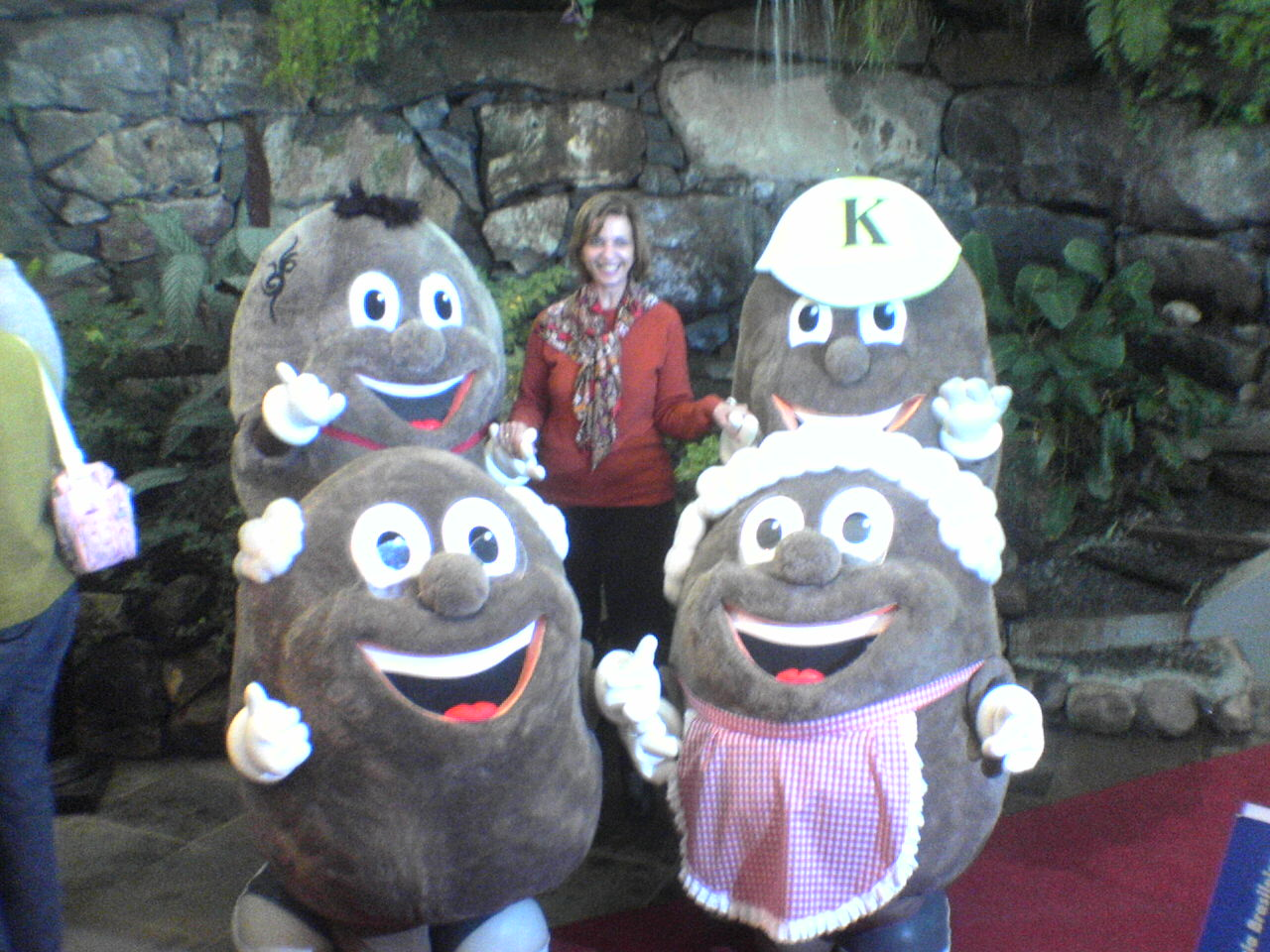
2006 Fenakiwi mascots.
