= Festival Amazonas de Ópera =

The Festival Amazonas de Ópera (Amazonas Opera Festival) is an annual festival of opera presented in the Amazon Theatre (Teatro Amazonas) in Manaus, Brazil.

It was founded in 1997; the first edition featured performances by violinist Michael Jelden and pianist Fabiana Biasini alongside the Orchestra of the Bolshoi Theater of Minsk. Also performed, by the same theater, were the operas La traviata, The Barber of Seville, and Carmen.

The Amazonas Philharmonic is the official orchestra of the Festival, which is held every year from March until May. In 2011 the orchestra completed its 15th consecutive year of participation in the festival.

In April 2008, the opera, Ça Ira by Roger Waters (from the British rock band Pink Floyd) was performed by the Amazonas Philharmonic at the opening of the XII Festival Amazonas de Ópera, with Luiz Fernando Malheiro conducting.

== See also ==
- List of music festivals in Brazil
- List of opera festivals
