= International Ballet Festival of Trujillo =

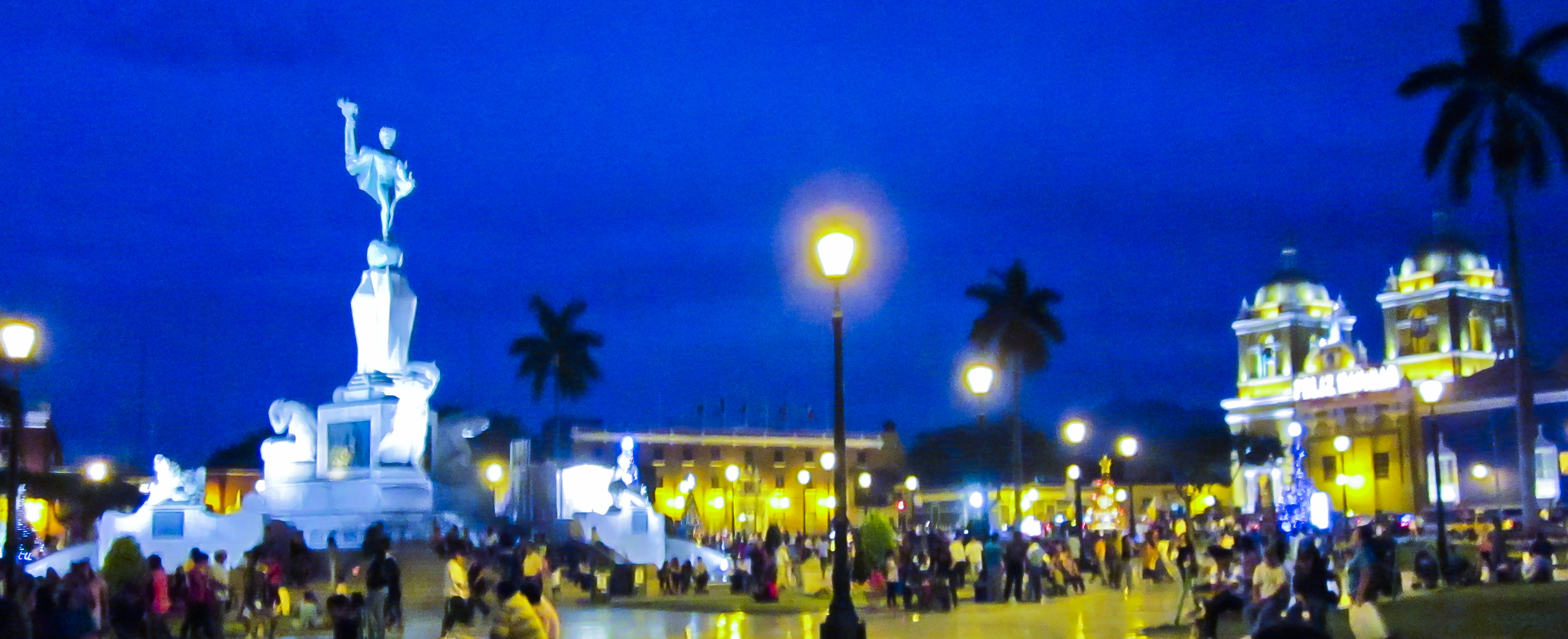
- Trujillo Main Square
- Genre: Dance
- Location: Trujillo city
- Years active: 1977 - present

The International Ballet Festival of Trujillo is an event held in the Peruvian city of Trujillo since 1977. The dancers vary with each event, but over the years participants have come from Chile, Ecuador, El Salvador, France, Mexico, and Germany

Currently, the festival is organized by the Ballet Company of Trujillo.

The years 2016 and 2018 also featured the "II International Ballet Festival of Trujillo." This is a separate and distinct festival, launched when the original was on hiatus. Many of the same individuals assist with both.

== History ==
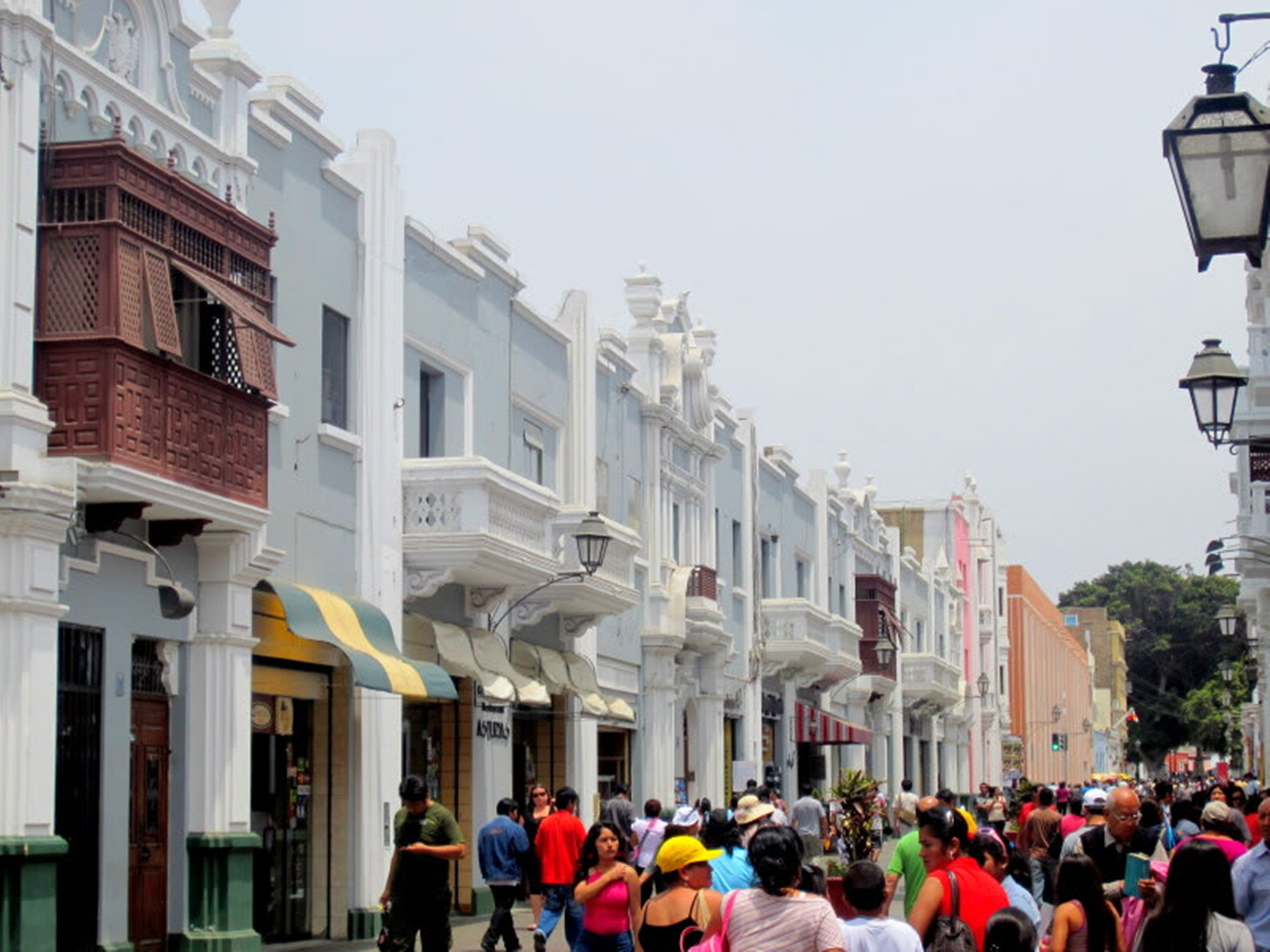
The International Ballet Festival of Trujillo takes place in the Historic Centre of Trujillo. Pizarro Street is shown here.

Lady Stella Puga was first dancer and founder of the Ballet of Chamber of Trujillo since 1960. In 1969 she founded in Trujillo city the School of Ballet. She was director or principal of INC in Trujillo, and in 1977 she organized the International Festival of Ballet of Trujillo, which had international recognition. The festival was organized and held since 1977 until 1996 by Stella Puga. Since year 2007 was returned and organized in national version by the INC-La Libertad through Selene Ruiz and Hugo Yucra the Director of the Ballet Company of Trujillo and Coordinator respectively. The festival in year 2012 takes an international version again.

Festival Dates:

November 6-7. 2012

November 7-9, 2018

The Ballet Company of Trujillo has organized the festival since 2007.

An "II International Ballet Festival of Trujillo" was launched in 2016 when the original festival was on hiatus. Both festivals are scheduled to run about a month apart in 2018.

The 2018 version of the "II International Festival," run by the Asociacion Festival Internatcional Danza Trujillo, featured dancers from Trujillo (Peru), Lima (Peru), Argentina), Chile, Mexico, Ecuodor, and the United States. In addition to evening performances, there were opportunities for both the performers and local dancers to take part in master classes from visiting artistic directors and other international artists. Dancers also had the opportunity to tour local ruins alongside their counterparts from other companies.

The II Festival of Trujillo dates:

October 18-20, 2018

== See also ==
- Huanchaco
- Las Delicias, Trujillo
- Santiago de Huamán
- Trujillo Marinera Festival
- Trujillo Spring Festival
- Víctor Larco Herrera District
