= Guitar Experience Festival =

- Genre: Rock, Alternative rock, Indie rock, Argentine rock, hard rock, blues, jazz, jazz fusion, funk.
- Dates: not specific, once a year
- Locations: Buenos Aires, Argentina
- Years active: 2009 - present
- Founders: Maycown Reichembach
- Website: Official homepage

The Guitar Experience Festival is the major electric guitar's exhibition in Argentina.

== Overview ==
In 2009, Maycown Reichembach - a professional guitarist who shares stage with international musicians such as Greg Howe, Stu Hamm, Kiko Loureiro among others - decided to create the local Guitar Festival and called it Guitar Experience Festival, an Argentine electric guitar's tribute. He is also the Producer and Participant of the next editions. Sometimes, guitarists Fernando Pareta and Pat Tomaselli also cooperated with Reichembach in the organization. The festival focuses on three or four shows per night playing instrumental themes: a showcase and a fellows´ meeting point for guitarists and virtuous performances for guitar's fans. The exhibition takes place once a year, in Buenos Aires. Not local guitar players are invited but also Latin American colleagues coming from Chile and Brazil. Other professional musicians are included as guest appearances. This international multi - genre festival is hosted by BA MÚSICA, Buenos Aires´ Culture Secretary.

== Editions ==
=== 2009 Edition ===
The first exhibition was held in Sarmiento Theater, Paso de los libres, Corrientes. It was an unusual location, Buenos Aires was chosen as the official venue for the next editions. On 20 November, Argentine musicians- Juan Cortés, Ignacio “Chowy” Fernández, Maycowwn Reichembach – were in charge of The Festival's release.

=== 2010 Edition ===
On 26 June 2010, the first edition introduced a large number of musicians on stage. Fifteen Latin American guitarists gave a show for more than three hours at the IFT Theatre. The artists were: Maycown Reichembach (founder); from Argentina: (Juan Cortés, Chowy Fernández, Silvio Gazquez, Fernando Pareta, Pablo Sebastián Rovner, Miguel Sigales, Pablo Soler); from Brazil: (Denison Fernandes, Zé Filho, Tiago de Moura, João Neto, Claudio Passamani, André Viegas) and from Chile, Pat Tomaselli. The only band invited was Machaca Böffe.

=== 2011 Edition ===
In 2011, The Guitar Experience Festival was produced as a Pocket Show - short-time presentations with few participants -. Fernando Pareta, Claudio Passamani, Maycown Reichembach, Pat Tomaselli were the guitarists invited to the third edition at the Pilar Auditorium, on 7 May 2011. Guest appearances: Ariel Pozzo - Miguel Mateos´ guitarist- and Matías Rocha. A jam between Tomaselli and Pozzo with Jimi Hendrix's themes closed the Festival.

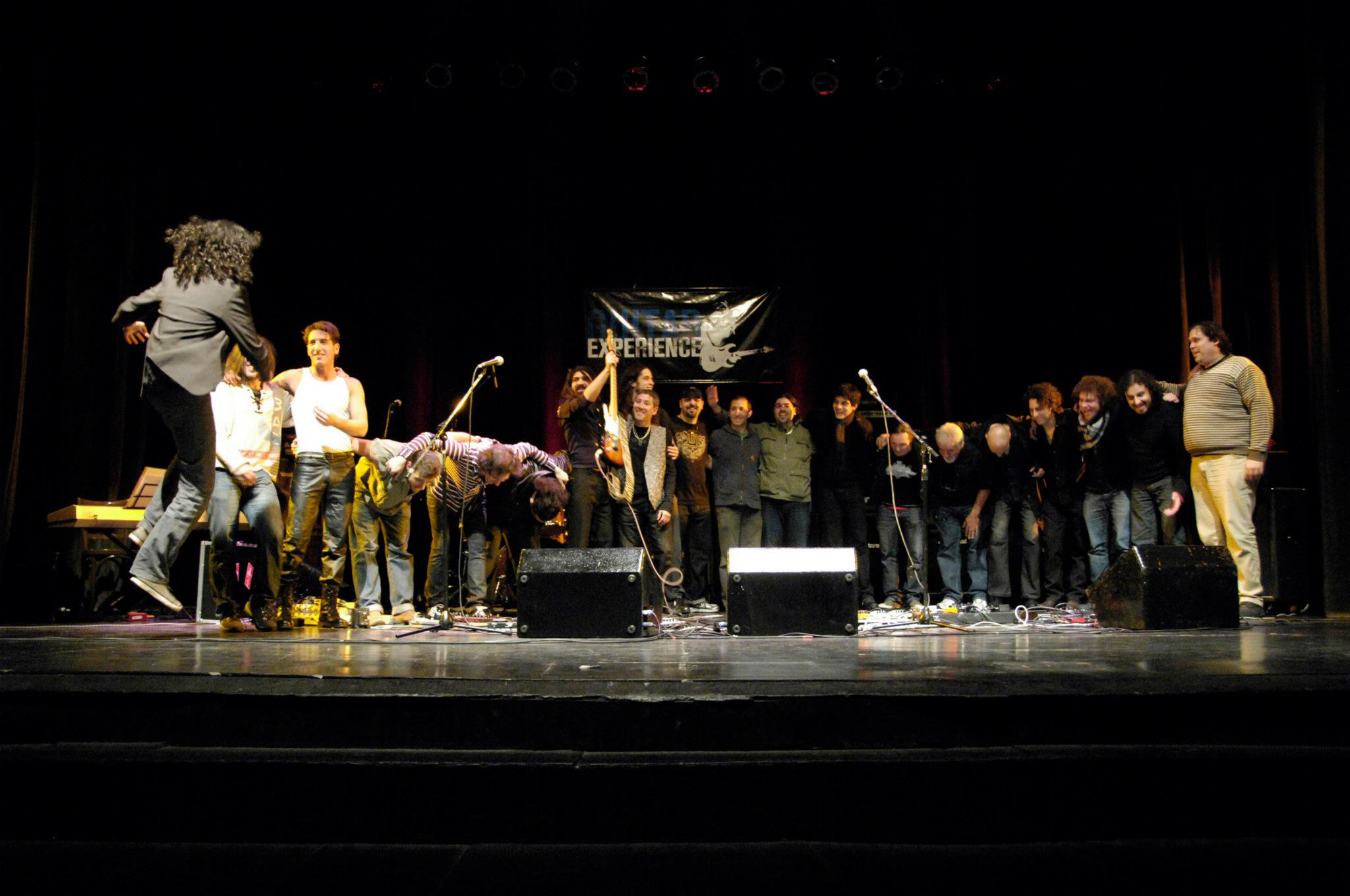
Guitar Experience Festival 2010

=== 2012 Edition ===
On 9 November 2012, the pocket shows continued with Fernando Pareta, Maycown Reichembach, Ariel Pozzo, Pat Tomaselli at La Roca Bar, but also included Javier Viñas, Leonardo Esjaita, Ariel Ferreyrola among others.

=== 2013 Edition ===
The fifth exhibition took place at Baruyo Bar on 12 April 2013. Felipe Staiti - Enanitos Verdes’ guitar player- joined the usual participants, Maycown Reichembach and Fernando Pareta. A second date is scheduled for the end of the year.
