= MASP Antique Market =

MASP Antique Market is held on Sundays in the city of São Paulo, Brazil and offers collector's items, arts, crafts, and antiques.

== Location ==
It is located in the space under the building of MASP (São Paulo Museum of Art) on Paulista Avenue Brazil. It opens 8:00 a.m. - 5:00 p.m. every Sunday.

== Layout ==
The open space under the MASP building is a large rectangular area. The stands are standardized and distributed according to a geometric coherent to the building of MASP. The corridors of stalls facilitate the people's circulation.

== History ==
Municipal Decree number 16,098, dated September 11, 1979, permits the Brazilian Association of Antiquaries (BAA) to use the open space under the Art Museum of São Paulo "Assis Chateaubriand" (MASP) free of charge to operate an antiques fair on Sundays from 8 a.m. to 5 p.m. The decree further provides that:

- According to the public interest, there may be a change of operating hours or a suspension of the antiques fair on one or more Sundays.

- The liability of the permittee for cleaning and conservation of the area in the days and hours of use.

- The BAA is responsible for any damage to the site or to third parties, as well as for all costs of the entrepreneurship.

- The Rules of the Fair, presented by the BAA, require prior approval of the Municipal Secretary of Culture and must contain rules of equality between candidates, as well as the rigorous examination of the evidence of their status as antiquary.

- It is the responsibility of the Secretary of Regional Administrations, under the guidance of the Municipal Secretary of Culture, to supervise the fair, with the goal of maintaining the artistic-cultural character of the event.

The development of an organizational basis signified the growing distinction of contemporary art from more popular art forms (DiMaggio 1982).

== The Fair and the Association of Antiquaries of the São Paulo State ==
Currently, the Fair is under the responsibility of the Association of Antiquaries of São Paulo, which on its page reports that the Fair today consists of about 100 exhibitors (members of the Association), duly registered at City Hall, occupying booths standardized and distributed in a coherent style, planned according to the MASP's building geometry. Also reports that the Fair is part of the tourist route in the city of São Paulo and receives every Sunday on average five thousand visitors from all parts of the world, bringing together art fans, collectors, tourists, antiquarians from other states, artists and the general public.

At the Fair, the Association conducts business and it also offers, according to the same, a great service to the community to learn about the many objects displayed there, in what constitutes a permanent and dynamic art exhibition. The Association also emphasizes that the Fair is now considered a national reference in the sector and it is a heaven for collectors and art lovers, delighting visitors with the variety of items on display. War memorabilia, ivory-made objects, old cameras and pens, china and crystal, antique toys, nautical items, dolls, miniatures, jewelry, coins, watches and sacred images, among many other fascinating pieces, and even books about art, make the Fair an indispensable attraction in Tourist Guides of São Paulo.

For the Association, the Paulista Antique Fair has a solid foundation for its success: the work of the Association of Antiquaries of São Paulo, responsible for administration, visual patterning, assembly, maintenance and realization of exhibitions conducted on Sundays at the free space under the MASP building (Esplanade Lina Bo Bardi). Another hallmark of the Fair is the organization and standardization of the tents. In each of them you can find a little of everything: from simple buttons for clothing, buckles for shoes, eccentric costume jewelry, to even valuable works of art. One need not be an expert in antiques to shop because the exhibitors clarify on the merits of each piece, and especially ensure the authenticity of the exhibits.

== More information about the Fair ==
If you want to know more about the fair, the Association of Antiquaries of the State of São Paulo, the objects displayed in the Fair, or the events that will take place at the fair, you can look for them in the pages of the Facebook Feira de Antiguidades do Masp and Feira do Masp.

== The Fair is a tourist attraction ==
It is a tourist attraction of the city of São Paulo recommended by the following publications: About Travel, Time Out, Guia da Folha.

== See also ==
- Flea market
