= Festa do Peão de Boiadeiro =

Festival in Brazil

The Festa do Peão de Boiadeiro (Portuguese for Cowboy's Peasant Party) or simply Cowboy Festival is a popular festival which includes a rodeo and country music concert set. It is located in Barretos, São Paulo, Brazil.

Other festivals like it are very common and popular in Brazil, highlighting the festivals held in the following locations: Andrelândia, Uberaba, Goiânia, Redenção, Araçatuba and Marabá.
