= Yamurikuma =

Wauja female spirit

Yamurikuma is a female spirit who represents the ancestral women of the indigenous Wauja people. The Wauja people are located at South America, in the Upper Xingu River, Brazil. Wauja people have celebrated Yamurikuma in rituals, ceremonies, and traditions for centuries. Shamans in Xingu villages call women specifically to perform sing and song rituals for the female spirit Yamurikuma and the deceased or terminally ill Xingu people. It is one of the only exceptions made for the women in these communities to lead a ritual. Yamurikuma is also celebrated in a festival named after the spirit herself. This festival is organized by the Xingu Tribes, and throughout this specific festival, the Xingu women take on the male roles of the tribe for a week.

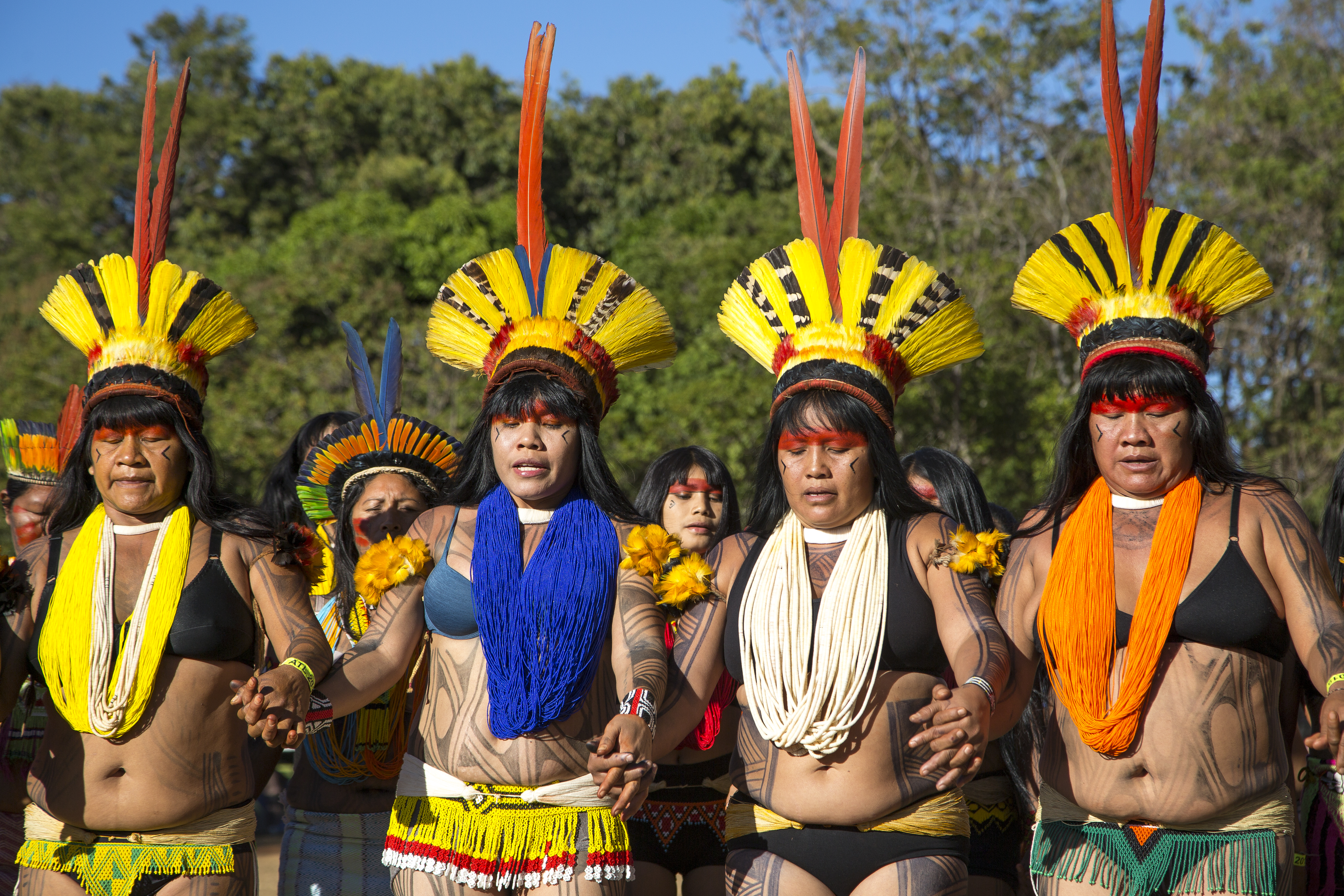
Xingu Women dancing

During the gender role reversal, the Xingu women wear traditional attire for men, which consists of feather headwear and anklet ornaments that rattle as they dance. Some examples of what their attire consists of is headwear made of various types of bird, Jaguar skin, and Jaguar claws as jewelry. These materials are considered distinguished and valuable, which were only worn by men of high prestige.

Throughout the festival they are also expected to participate in various physical activities such as tug of war, races, swimming, archery, and carrying heavy objects like logs. Overall, the most celebrated activity performed by the Xingu women in the Yamurikuma festival is the huka-huka wrestling matches.

== Yamurikuma Rituals ==
Shamans are responsible for the communication between the spirits. They perform rituals to heal and to protect by luring them with music, singing and dancing. When a Wauja native is with disease, the healing ritual is performed based on the diagnoses of the shaman. It is believed that illness is an open gate for spirits to attach to a human's soul, causing a humans soul to separate from its body. Whether the spirits are evil or nonthreatening, the shaman is mainly responsible of diagnosing the patient and/or performing the ritual to detach the spirit from their patients so that their soul can reattach to its body and be able to heal. The patient's family can opt out of one-on-one ritual healing with a shaman, and go a different route by seeking help from their community. In a group, they can perform the ritual together as an alternative, making it a public ceremony. Family's can pay shamans with valuables like shells, jewelry, headwear, and money.

Music is an important source of communication with spirits. Flutes are the common instrument played to create music during rituals. When luring Yamurikuma with music, it is often performed by a group of women that the shaman reaches out to. When the female spirit, Yamurikuma, is included in a patient's diagnoses he calls for a group of women in the tribe to help communicate with Yamurikuma to heal its victim of illness. Depending on the means of the ritual or ceremony, men can sometimes perform the Yamurikuma ritual.

When a villager helps a patient, they perform the ritual to extract the spirits by channeling and representing the diagnosed spirit. By serving the representative drink, tobacco, and food, the spirits can enjoy these offerings through representative and leave the ill person. Following their detachment from the patient's soul, the spirit will continue to communicate and celebrate their departure with the patient and family with sing and dance.

== Yamurikuma Festival ==
During the week of the Yamurikuma festival, Xingu women take on the daily responsibilities that men normally perform, from chores to athletic competitions to ceremonial performances. Through this gender reversal, women are celebrated as strong individuals and shown to be valued members of Xingu Indigenous society.

=== Huka Huka ===
Also referred to as "Kindene", Huka-huka is the more common term used to refer to the wrestling practice amongst the Xingu people. These wrestling matches may serve as funeral rituals for the Kuarup ceremonies that celebrate life, death, and rebirth. They are also practiced in the Yamurikuma festival by the Xingu women once a year, and continue to be practiced till this day.

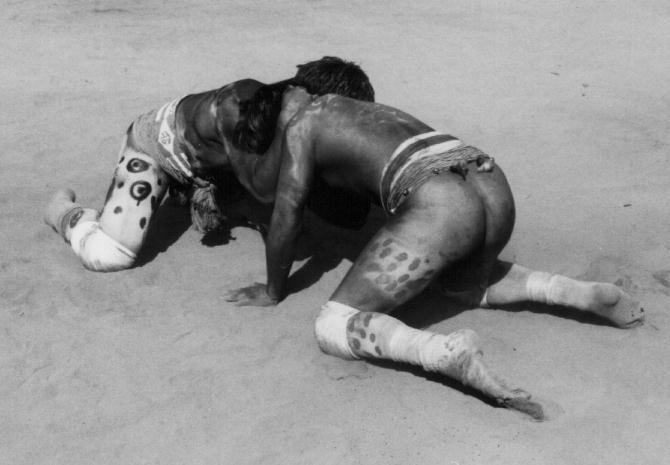
huka-huka wrestlers

During these wrestling matches the opponents face each other, and rotate clockwise while grunting like a jaguar. They then kneel to the ground, shake each other's hands, then begin to wrestle.

These wrestling matches last for no longer than a minute. The winners are determined by who lifts their opponent off the ground or who manages to knock them down.

== Bibliography ==
1. Ball, Christopher. “As Spirits Speak: Interaction in Wauja Exoteric Ritual.” Journal de La Société Des Américanistes, vol. 97, no. 1, 2011, pp. 87–117, https://www.jstor.org/stable/24606458.
2. Costa, Carlos Eduardo. “Practices of looking, transformations in cheering: Alliances and rivalries in Upper Xinguan wrestiling1.” Anuário Antropológico, vol. 46, no. 2, 2021, pp. 254–270, https://doi.org/10.4000/aa.8343.
3. Harvey, Penelope. “Ch.4 Ritual and the Origin of Sexuality in the Alto Xingu.” Sex and Violence: Issues in Representation and Experience, edited by Peter Gow, Routledge, New York, NY, 1994, pp. 90–96, https://books.google.com/books?id=KGXezlZnjF8C&dq=Yamurikuma+festival&pg=PA90 Accessed 1 Oct. 2023.
4. Hill, Jonathan. “Kamayura Flute Music: A Study of Music as meta-communication.” Ethnomusicology, vol. 23, no. 3, 1979, pp. 417–432, JSTOR 850913.
5. Regitano, Aline, and Chloe Nahum-Claudel. “Feminist perspectives in Indigenous Amazonia.” Cardenos de Campo (San Paolo, Online), vol. 30, no. 2, 2021, pp. 1–23, doi:10.11606/issn.2316-9133.v30i2pe193718
6. Santos-Granero, Fernando. “5 The (De)Animalization of Objects: Food Offerings and Subjectivization of Masks and Flutes among the Wauja of Southern Amazonia.” The Occult Life of Things: Native Amazonian Theories of Materiality and Personhood, University of Arizona Press, Tucson, 2009, pp. 128–151.
7. Stang, Carla. “Ch.4 Experience of Mehinaku Experience.” A Walk to the River in Amazonia: Ordinary Reality for the Mehinaku Indians, Berghahn Books, New York, 2012, pp. 125–150, https://www.jstor.org/stable/j.ctt9qd5ch.13. Accessed 27 Sept. 2023.
