= Encontro de Cultura Huni Kuin =

Cultural gathering for the indigenous Huni Kuin tribe in Brazil

The Huni Kuin Cultural Gathering (Portuguese: Encontro de Cultura [ĩˈkõtɾu dʒi kuwˈtuɾɐ]) is an annual cultural gathering from the Huni Kuin tribe that is held in the Kaxinawa do Rio Jordão Indigenous Land, in the Brazilian state of Acre. It assembles indigenous people from about 40 different villages, and attracts visitors from around the world.

The event takes place in the Boa Vista Village (Portuguese: Aldeia Boa Vista [awˈdejjɐ ˈbo(ww)ɐ ˈvistɐ]), Good View), a local community. The closest municipality Jordão is about 600 km from the capital Rio Branco, and located in a remote and isolated area, accessible only by plane or boat.

Activities are organized by the Instituto Indígena Huni Kuin Yube Inu, a nonprofit indigenous organization that works to promote the political, economic, sociocultural and spiritual development of the Huni Kuin people.

== History ==
The gathering began in 2017 as a way to celebrate local indigenous culture and heritage. A festival known as the Nukun Dewe Festival is held each year to provide a space to exchange experience and knowledge among generations.

- June 30 – July 4, 2017
- April 22 – May 2, 2018
- April 12–22, 2019 (upcoming)

== Goals ==
- Promote union and strengthening of Huni Kuin villages and territories.
- Enhance cultural heritage of the Huni Kuin people.
- Promote cultural renewal and increase individual and collective knowledge through the exchange of experiences and knowledge between generations.
- Nurture a global awareness about the importance of the Amazon rainforest.
- Promote indigenous ecotourism and sustainable development practices.
