= Bicentennial of the flag of Argentina =

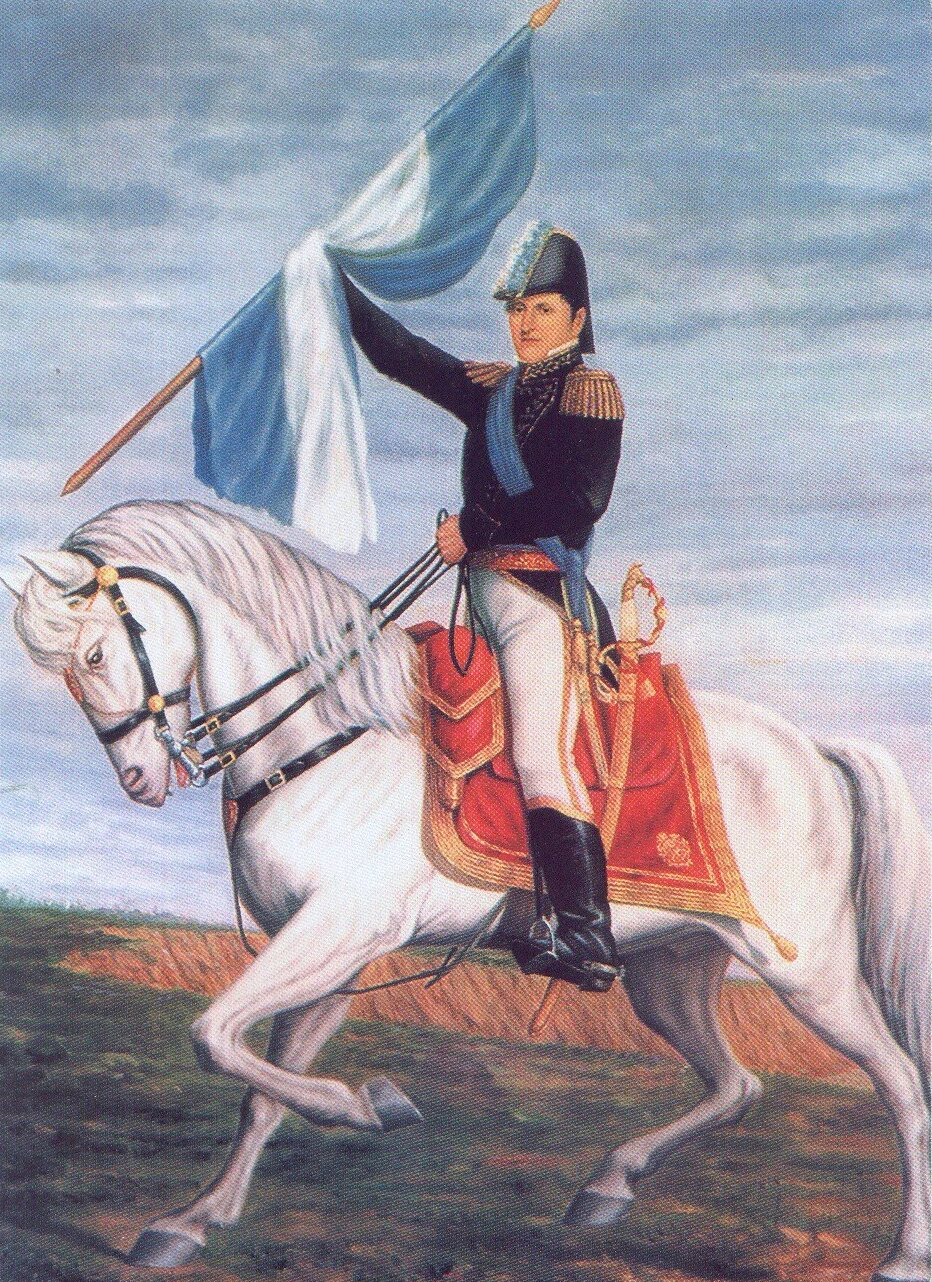
Manuel Belgrano holding the Flag of Argentina.

The Bicentennial of the flag of Argentina was celebrated on February 27, 2012. It commemorated the 200th anniversary of the creation of the flag of Argentina by Manuel Belgrano, during the Argentine War of Independence. Most celebrations took place at Rosario, as the event took place in that city.

== Historical event ==
The Flag of Argentina was created by Manuel Belgrano during the Argentine War of Independence. After concluding the Paraguay campaign, he moved to Rosario to build artilleries. While being in the village he noticed that both the royalist and patriotic forces were using the same colors, Spain's yellow and red. He proposed to the national government the use of a new cockade, blue and white. It was approved, so he created a flag of the same colours nine days later. It was first flown on 27 February 1812, next to the Paraná River. The government did not accept the flag, but Belgrano had left to the north, following previous orders. Still unaware about the rejection, Belgrano raised the flag at San Salvador de Jujuy and had it blessed by the local church on the second anniversary of the May Revolution. When he got the news from the government, he hide the flag.

The Assembly of the Year XIII allowed the flag as a war flag. The first oath to the newly approved flag was on February 13, 1813, next to the Salado River, which as also known since then as "Río Juramento" ("Oath River"). The first battle fought with the approved flag was the battle of Salta, a decisive patriotic victory that achieved the complete defeat of royalist Pío Tristán.

== Festivities ==
The celebrations were held from February 23 to 27. The first four days had theater plays with the life of Manuel Belgrano. Fito Páez and other musicians played a concert on February 24, at the National Flag Memorial. Another concert was held on February 26, ending with the Argentine National Anthem at midnight. The following day, a giant flag was moved to the National Flag Memorial. There was a parade with the president and provincial governors attending.

== See also ==
- Argentina Bicentennial
