= Paraguay Bicentennial =

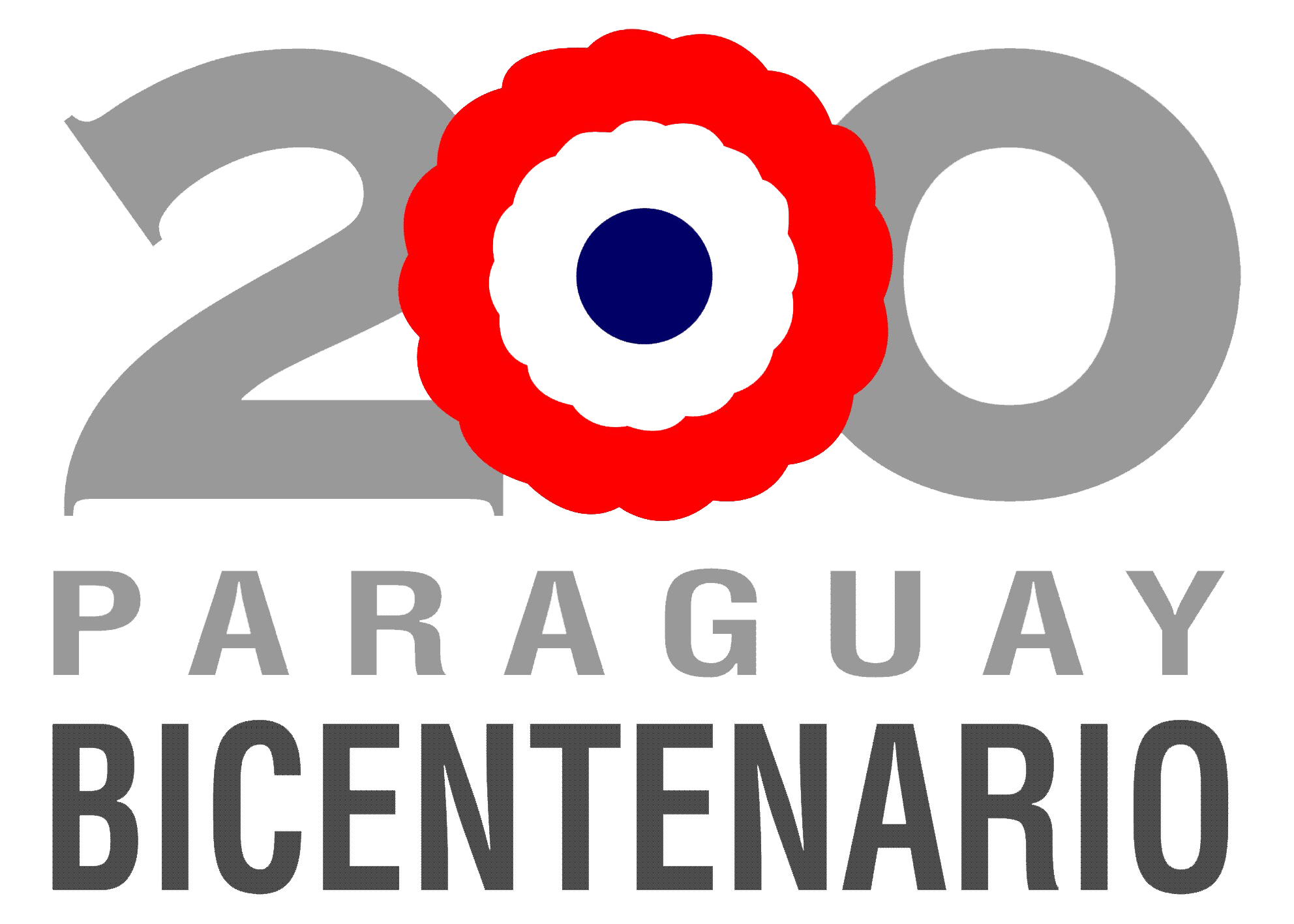
Paraguay Bicentennial official logo.

The Bicentennial of the Independence of the Republic of Paraguay is a group of festivities that took place in Paraguay and Paraguayan communities abroad, on the occasion of the celebration of 200 years of Independence of Paraguay from Spanish Empire in 1811. The activities in relation to Bicentennial of Paraguay took off in 2010 and culminated in late 2011.

== Paraguayan independence ==
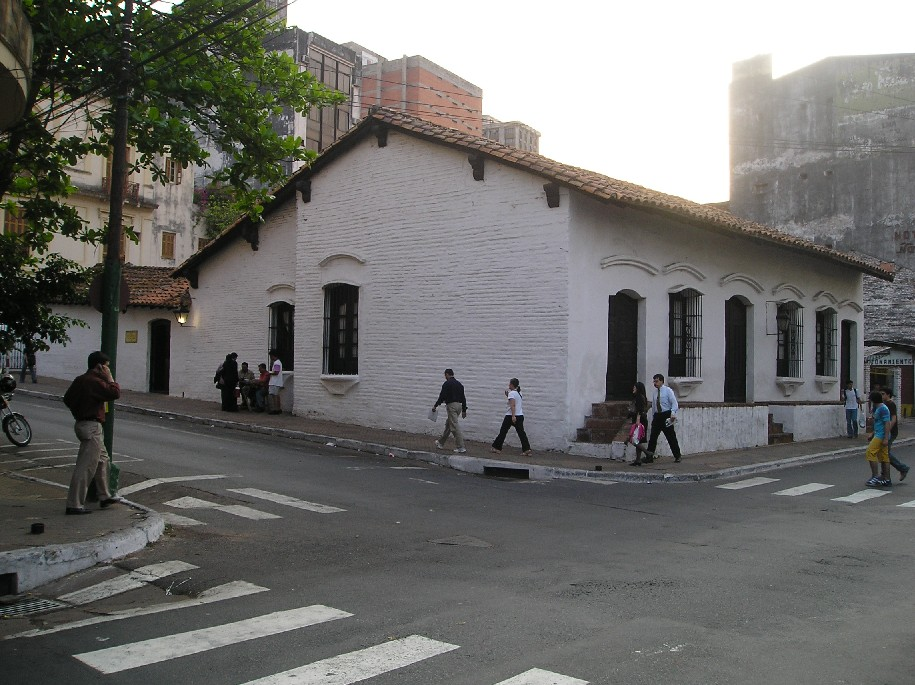
Casa de la Independencia Museum. In 1811, precisely in the night of the May 14, a group of brave Paraguayans came out of this house to declare the independence of Paraguay.

== Preparations for the festivities ==
=== Organising Committee for the commemoration ===
The National Commission for the Commemoration of the Bicentennial of the Independence of the Republic of Paraguay, is a body created by Law No. 3,495 and is responsible for the planning and implementation of projects to celebrate the Bicentennial of National Independence. It consists of a Board, a Standing Advisory Committee and an Executive Secretariat.

== See also ==
- Argentina Bicentennial
- List of festivals in Paraguay
