= Boa Vista do Ramos =

Municipality of Amazonas, Brazil

- Municipality
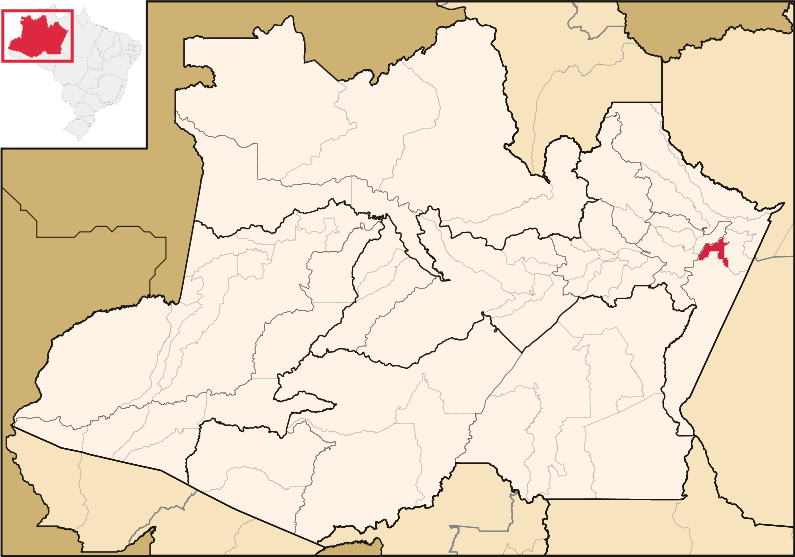
- Location of the municipality inside Amazonas

- Location in Brazil
- Coordinates: 2°58′12″S 57°35′24″W
- Country: Brazil
- Region: North
- State: Amazonas

Population (2020)
  - Total: 19,626
- Time zone: UTC−4 (AMT)

Boa Vista do Ramos (Good View of Branches) is a municipality located in the Brazilian state of Amazonas. Its population was 19,626 (2020) and its area is 2,587 km^{2}.
