= Día de la Canción Criolla =

Peruvian holiday

The Día de la Canción Criolla (Creole Music Day) is a Peruvian festivity celebrated yearly on 31 October. The event celebrates the criollo culture of Peru. It was established on 18 October 1944, by the President Manuel Prado y Ugarteche.

== History ==
The celebration was established, by supreme resolution of 18 October 1944, to be celebrated on 31 October of each year, to coincide with the feast of the Lord of Miracles. It was promulgated by President Manuel Prado Ugarteche and the Minister of Education Pedro M. Oliveira. It was also promoted by Carlos A. Saco, who was director of the newspaper El Comercio.
