= Estamos en la Calle =

Estamos en la Calle Festival Cultural de Arte Urbano “Estamos en la Calle”
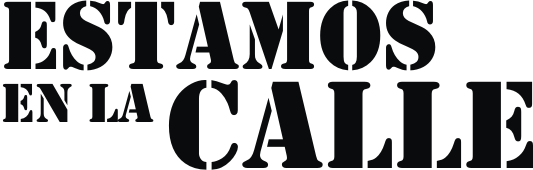
- Festival logo.
- Genre: Street art, music (rock, heavy metal, hip hop, indie pop, progressive rock, Amazonian music), theater, graffiti, dancing
- Frequency: Annually
- Locations: Iquitos, Peru
- Years active: 18
- Website: http://www.estamosenlacalle.org/

El Festival Cultural de Arte Urbano “Estamos en la Calle”, (English: Street‐Art Cultural Festival “We’re on the Streets”) commonly known as Estamos en la Calle, is a non-profit annual festival of street art, presented in Iquitos, Peru. To date, it has been held ten times. It is organized primarily by the Instituto Nacional de Cultura del Perú and a youth group of the same name. Beginning with the first festival, presentations have showcased street performers, musical works, theater, poetry, fine and graf artists, jugglers, live bands, documentary screenings, and news conferences. The idea for “Estamos en la Calle” arose in late 2007, inspired by a much smaller event, where a few rock groups gathered to perform.

== Festivals ==
- I Festival Cultural de Arte Urbano "Estamos en la calle" (July 7, 2008)
- II Festival Cultural de Arte Urbano "Estamos en la calle" (July 20–25, 2009)
- III Festival Cultural de Arte Urbano "Estamos en la calle" (August 6–28, 2010)
