= Encuentro Internacional de Escultura en Madera-Piedra-Hierro de Rosario =

The Encuentro Internacional de Escultura en Madera-Piedra-Hierro de Rosario ("International Meeting of Wood-Stone-Iron Sculpture in Rosario") is an artistic event celebrated every year, since 1993, in Rosario, province of Santa Fe, Argentina. It is organized by the Sculptors Association of Rosario.

This event is attended by sculptors from Argentina and a number of other countries, and lasts about a week. It is always celebrated outdoors and before the eyes of the public. The artists must work on a roughly 180×50 cm trunk, or an irregular-shaped stone over 0.25 m^{3}, or pieces of iron, in order to create a sculpture. Stone and iron works are then placed in public places of the city.

== Sources ==
- Comienza el encuentro internacional de escultores - from La Capital, online edition, 25 September 2004 (in Spanish)
