= Amazon Theatre =

Opera house in Manaus, Brazil

Amazon Theater
- Teatro Amazonas
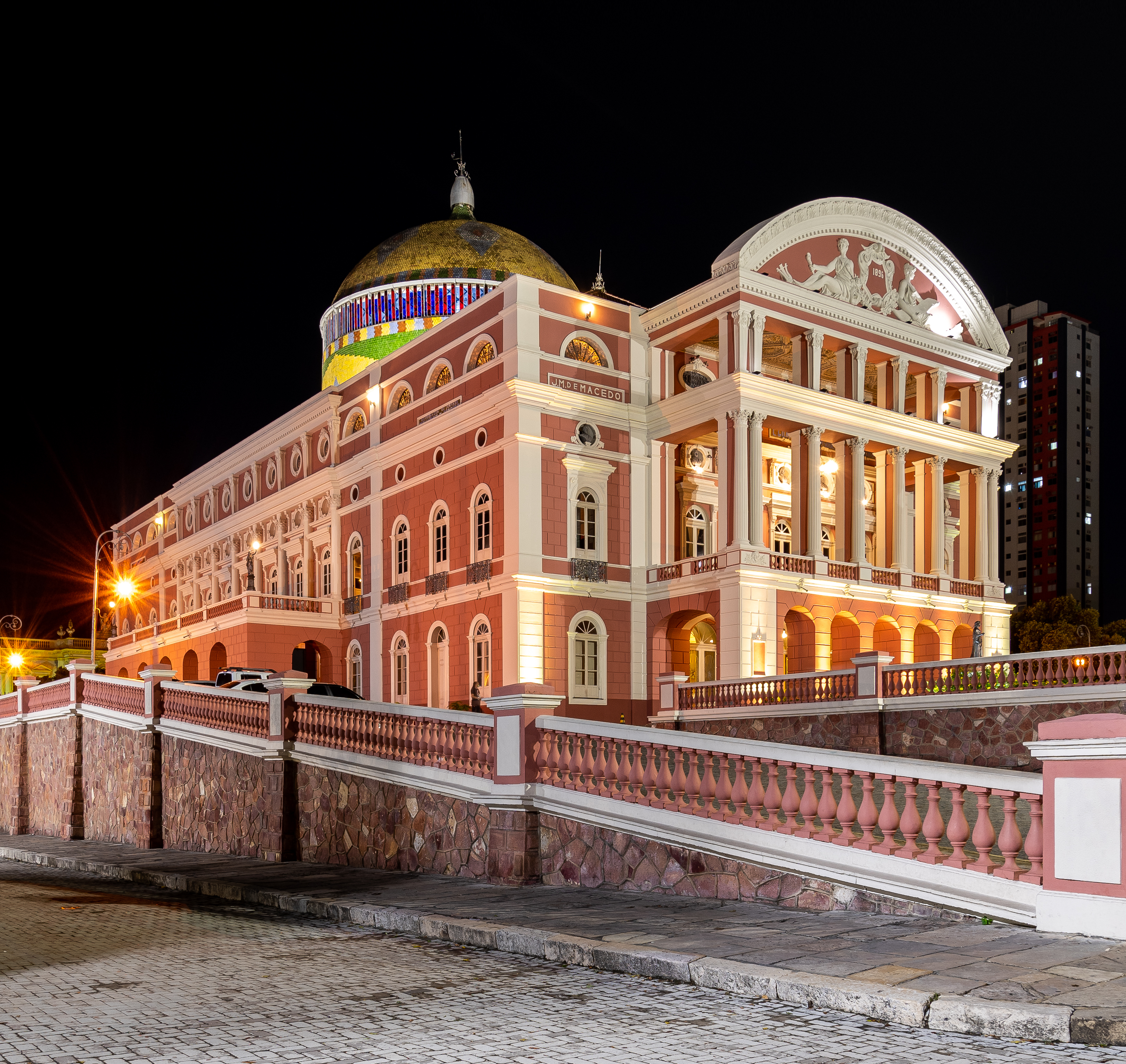

General information
- Type: Opera house
- Architectural style: Renaissance Revival
- Location: Eduardo Ribeiro Avenue; Centro, Manaus, Brazil
- Coordinates: 3°7′49″S 60°1′24″W
- Elevation: 92 m (302 ft)
- Current tenants: Amazonas Philharmonic
- Construction started: 1884
- Inaugurated: 31 December 1896; 129 years ago
- Owner: Amazonas State president

Dimensions
- Other dimensions: 68,70m x 124,50m

Technical details
- Floor count: 3
- Floor area: 92 meters

Design and construction
- Architect: Celestial Sacardim
- Architecture firm: Portuguese Office of engineering and architecture
- Structural engineer: Bernardo Antônio de Oliveira Braga
- Other designers: Crispim do Amaral

Other information
- Seating capacity: 701

Website
- teatroamazonas.com.br

UNESCO World Heritage Site
- Official name: Teatro Amazonas
- Part of: Amazonia Theaters
- Criteria: Cultural: ii, iv
- Reference: 1774
- Inscription: 2026 (48th Session)

National Historic Heritage of Brazil
- Designated: 1966
- Reference no.: 390

The Amazon Theatre (Portuguese: Teatro Amazonas) is an opera house located in Manaus, Brazil. It is the location of the annual Festival Amazonas de Ópera (Amazonas Opera Festival) and the home of the Amazonas Philharmonic Orchestra which regularly rehearses and performs at the Amazon Theatre along with choirs, musical concerts and other performances.

More than 126 years old, it represents the city's heyday during the rubber boom. It was chosen by the magazine Vogue as one of the most beautiful opera houses in the world. In July 2026, it was designated by UNESCO as a World Heritage Site along with Teatro da Paz.

== History ==
The Amazonas Theatre was built during the Belle Époque at a time when fortunes were made in the rubber boom. Construction of the Amazon Theatre was first proposed in 1881 by a member of the local House of Representatives, Antonio Jose Fernandes Júnior, who envisioned a "jewel" in the heart of the Amazon rainforest.

In 1882, the State legislature approved some limited financing, but this was considered insufficient. Later that year, the president of the Province, José Lustosa Paranaguá, approved a larger budget and initiated a competition for the presentation of plans. The chosen project was made by the Gabinete Português de Engenharia e Arquitectura, an engineering and architecture office from Lisbon. By 1884, construction was ready to begin under the Italian architect Celestial Sacardim. Work proceeded slowly over the following fifteen years with some stops and restarts from 1885 to 1892.

By 1895, when the masonry work and exterior were completed, the decoration of the interior and the installation of electric lighting could begin more rapidly. The theatre was inaugurated on December 31, 1896, with the first performance occurring on January 7, 1897, with the Italian opera, La Gioconda, by Amilcare Ponchielli.

== Architecture and style ==
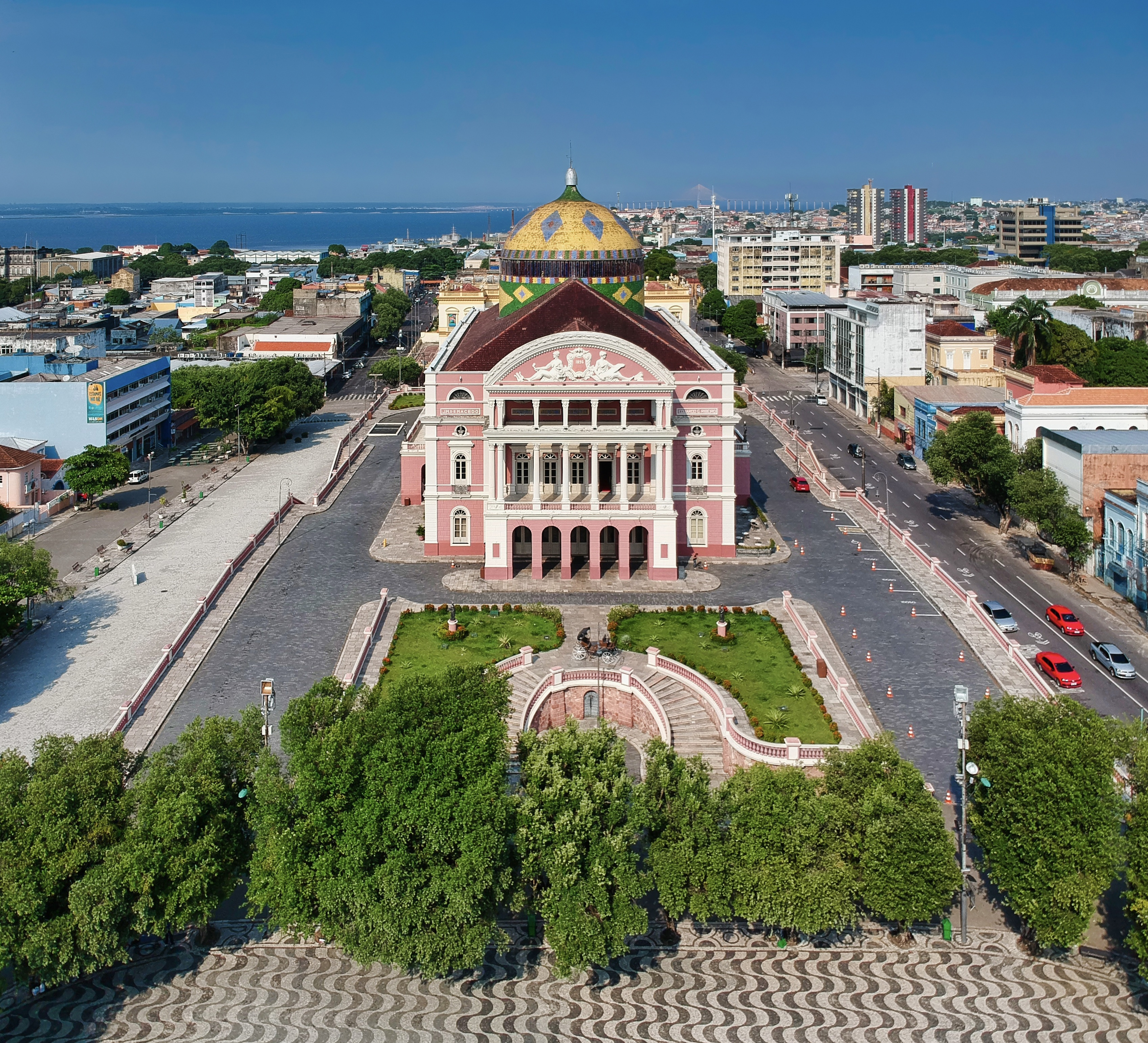
Amazon Theatre and its surrounding area in 2017

The theatre's architectural style is considered typically Renaissance Revival. The roofing tiles were imported from Alsace, the steel walls from Glasgow, Scotland and the Carrara marble for the stairs, statues and columns, from Italy. The dome is covered with 36,000 decorated ceramic tiles painted in the colors of the national flag of Brazil. The interior furnishing came from France in the Louis Quinze style. Italian artist Domenico de Angelis the Younger painted the panels that decorate the ceilings of the auditorium and of the audience chamber. The curtain, with its painting "Meeting of the Waters", was originally created in Paris by Crispim do Amaral. The theatre's 198 chandeliers were imported from Italy, including 32 of Murano glass.

== Internal structure ==
The Auditorium seats 701 persons. The ground floor (stalls, in British usage) seats 266; the stall boxes, 100; the first-tier boxes seat 110; the 25 second-tier boxes seat 125; and the 20 third-tier boxes seat 100. The Main Stage is 10.50 m (34.4 ft) wide, 6.40 m (21.0 ft) high and 11.97 m (39.3 ft) deep and the principal stage is 14 m (46 ft) high for a total area of 123.29 m^{2} (1,327.1 sq ft). The orchestra pit has a height of 2 m (6 ft 7 in); width: 6 ft 11 ins; and a length of 7 m (23 ft).

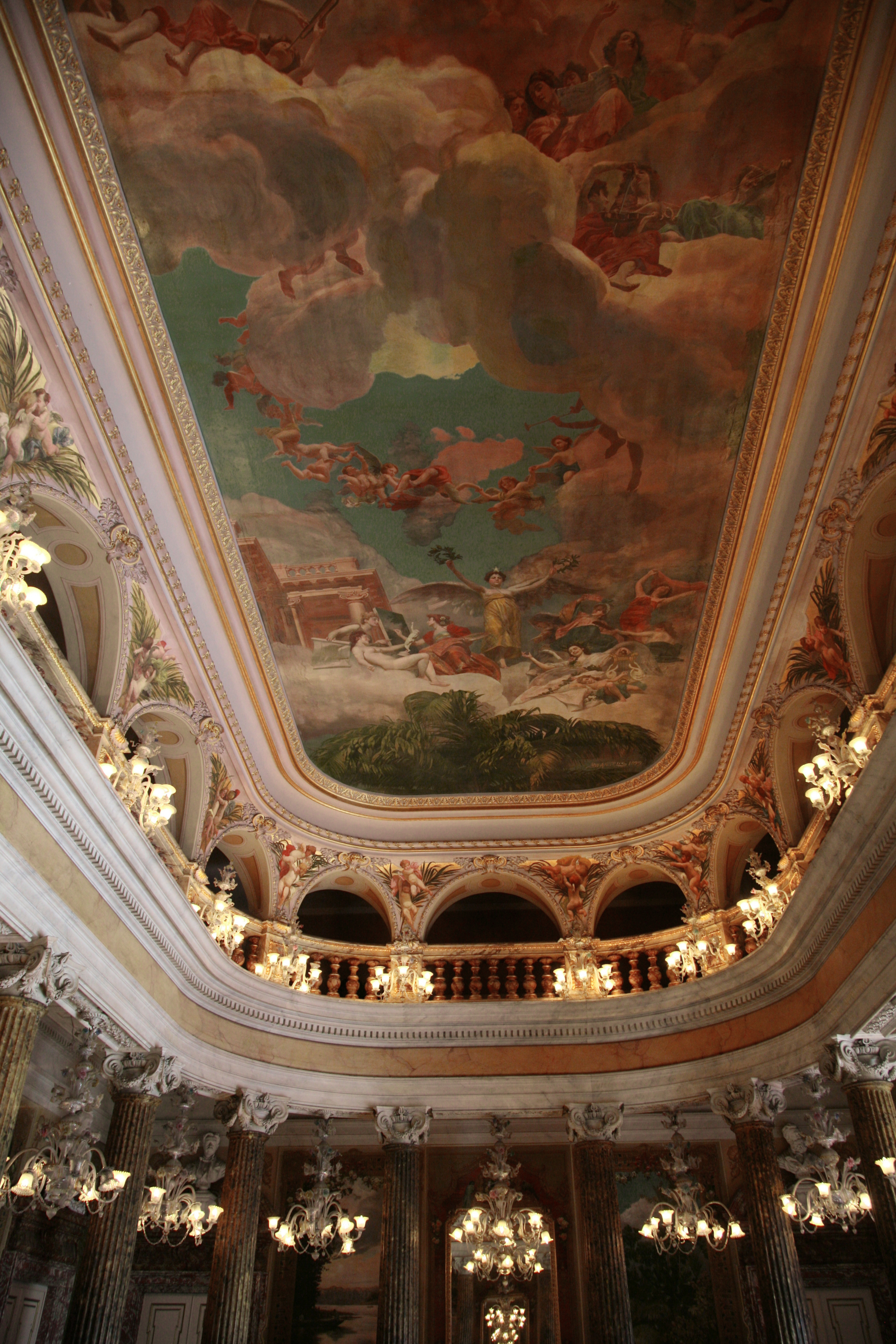
Salão Nobre, the ballroom.

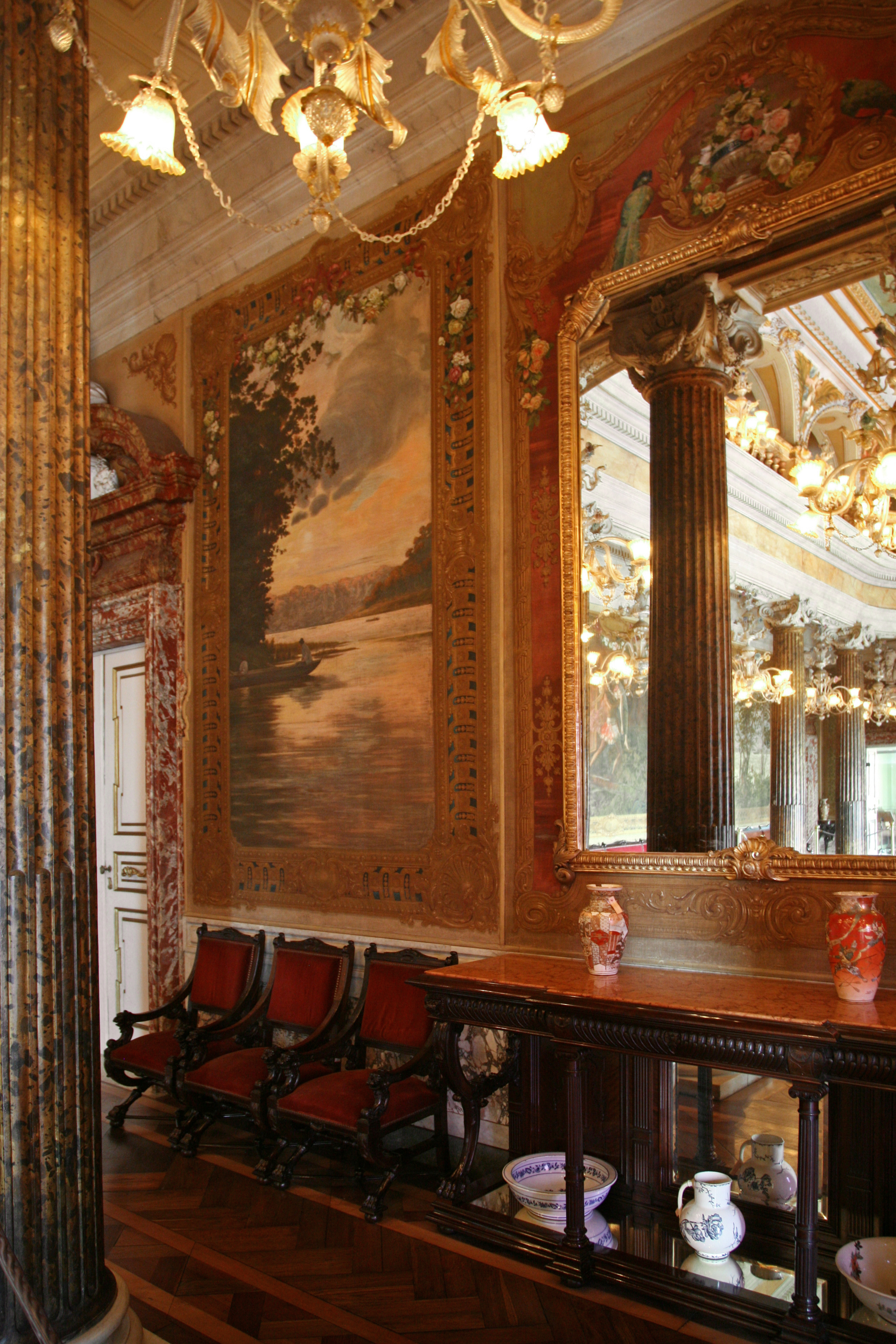
Gallery of the Salão Nobre.

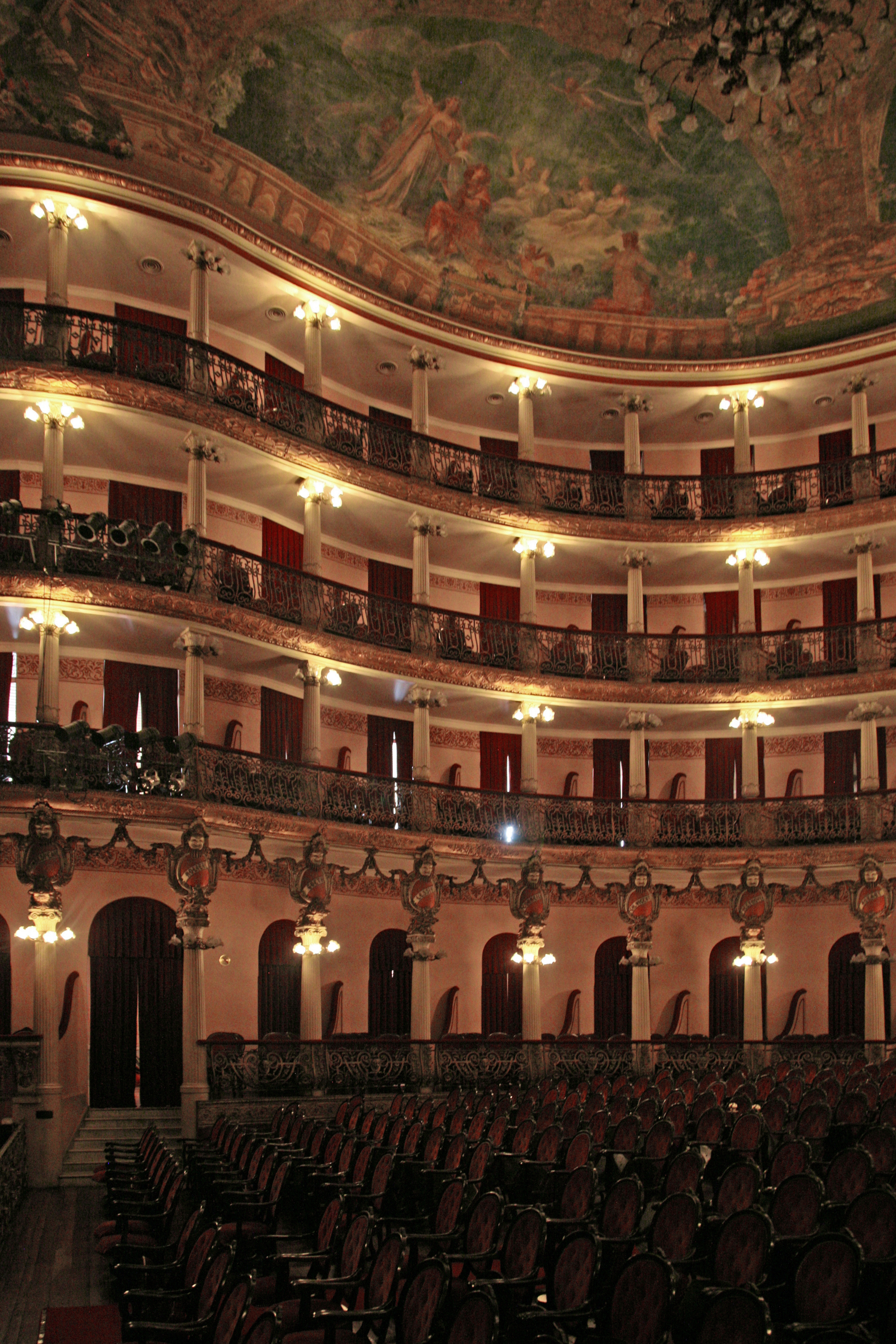
Auditorium seating 701.

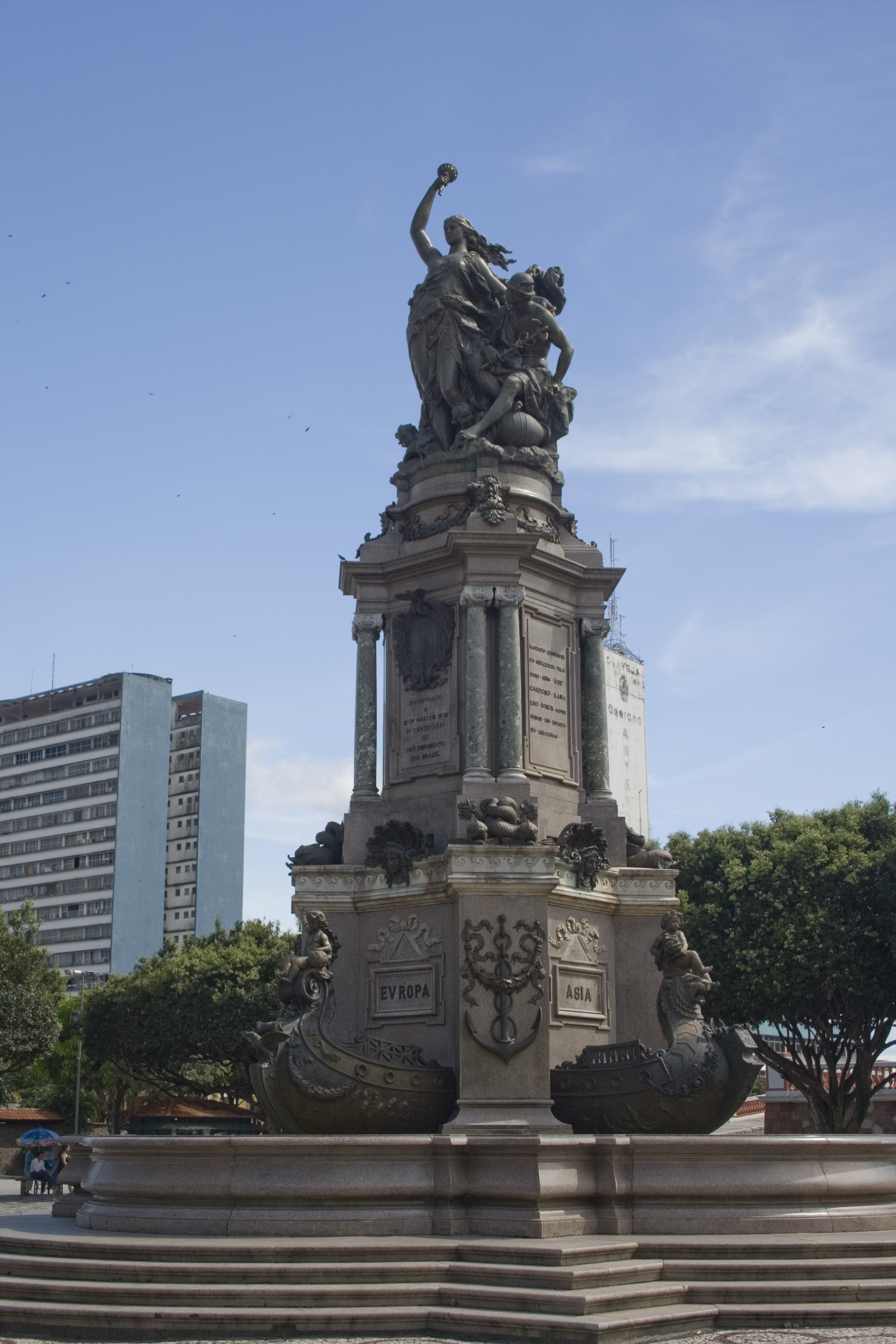
Monument Abertura dos Portos, located in front of the theatre.

== In popular culture ==
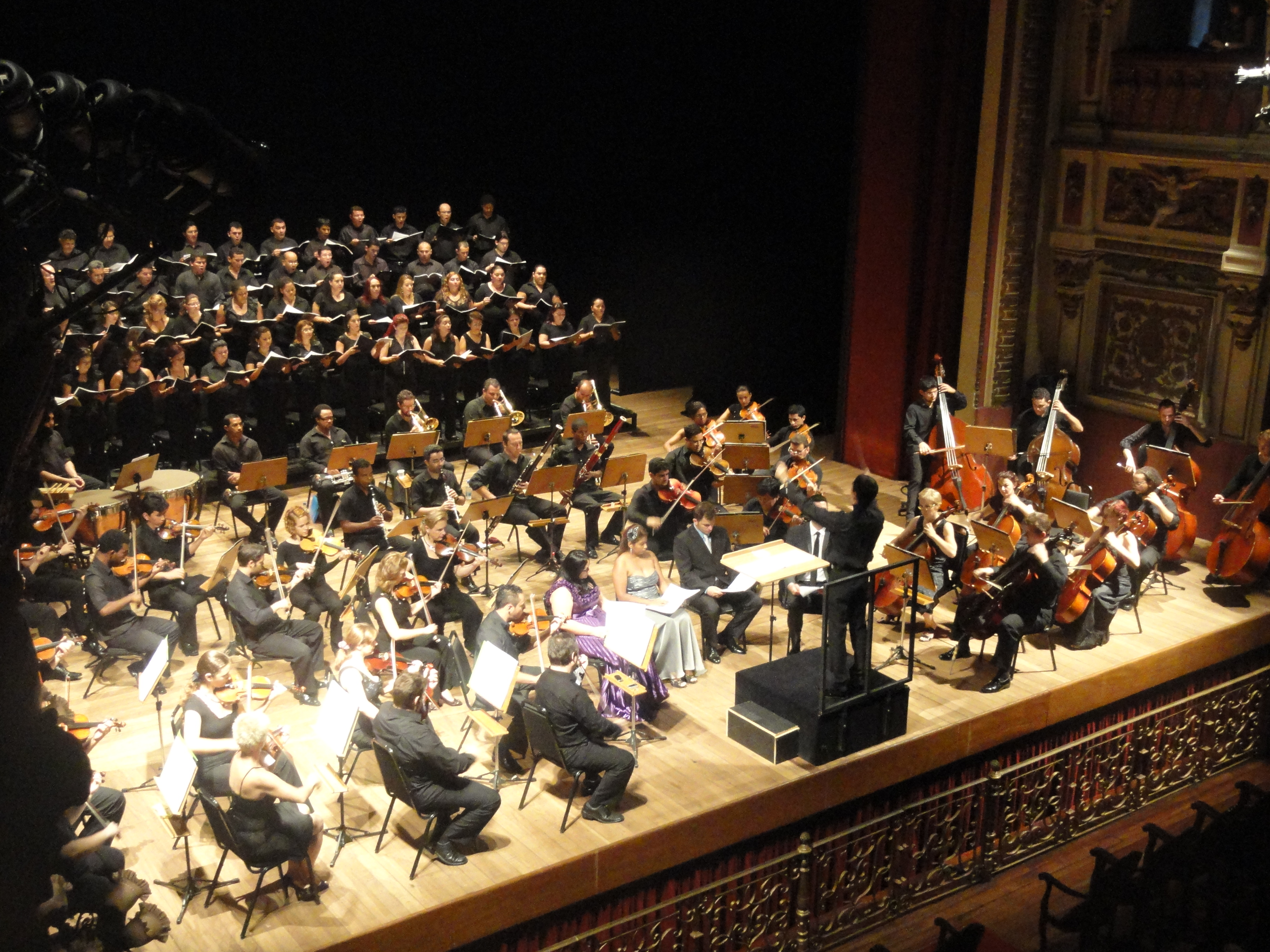
Orchestra playing inside the theatre.

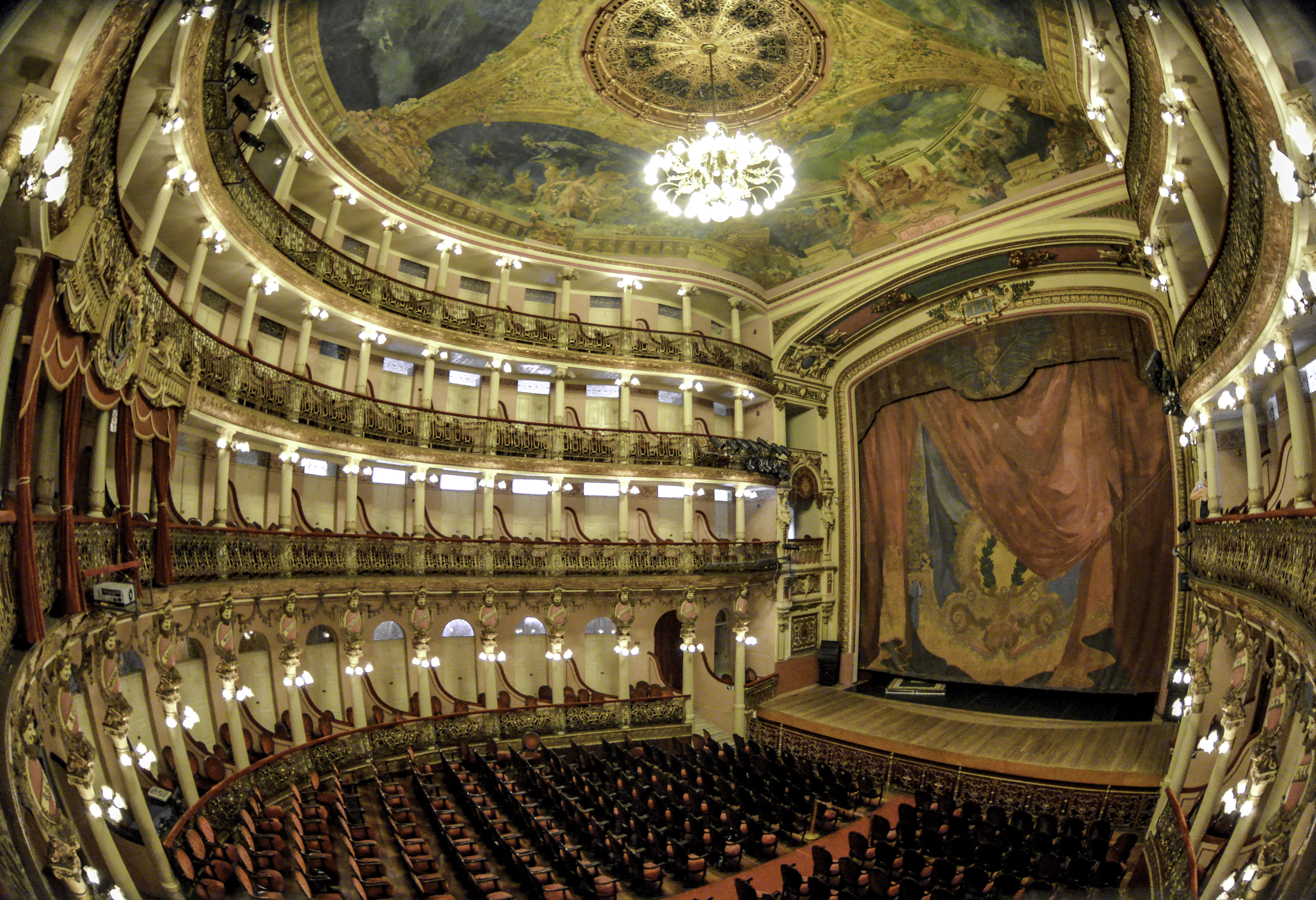
The Auditorium

- The theatre is featured in the film Fitzcarraldo directed by the German director Werner Herzog in 1982. At the beginning of the film, the opera-obsessed character Brian Sweeney "Fitzcarraldo" Fitzgerald makes his way by paddling his own boat to the opera house to hear Enrico Caruso sing in Verdi's Ernani, which also features aging Sarah Bernhardt whose role is sung by an off-stage soprano.
- It is featured twice in novels by Eva Ibbotson: Journey to the River Sea and A Company of Swans. Both are adventure stories set principally in the city of Manaus (where the theatre is situated) and surroundings in 1912. In the former (children's) book a visiting acting group performs the play, Little Lord Fauntleroy at the theatre, which is briefly described. In the latter (young adult) novel a visiting ballet troupe performs Swan Lake, Giselle, The Nutcracker and La Fille Mal Gardee at the theatre.
- The theatre was featured in Ann Patchett's 2011 novel, State of Wonder; the characters attend a performance of Orfeo ed Euridice by Christoph Willibald Gluck.
- The film Pavarotti opens with Luciano Pavarotti traveling to the theatre in 1995 to replicate Caruso's performance there.
- The theatre is mentioned in Daniel Catán's 1996 opera "Florencia en el Amazonas" as the location where the titular opera singer Florencia Grimaldi is traveling to give a concert.
- On June 1, 2005, The White Stripes performed in the theater. The show was later released on vinyl and DVD formats as Under Amazonian Lights. It was reported to be the first rock show at the theater.

== See also ==
- Brazilian Belle Époque, the broader cultural and economic period in which the theatre was built
- History of Manaus, for the development of the city during the Amazon rubber boom
- List of opera houses, for other opera houses in Brazil and elsewhere
- Teatro da Paz, another major 19th-century opera house in the Brazilian Amazon
