= Cine Olympia =

Movie theater in Belém, Pará, Brazil

- Cinema Olympia
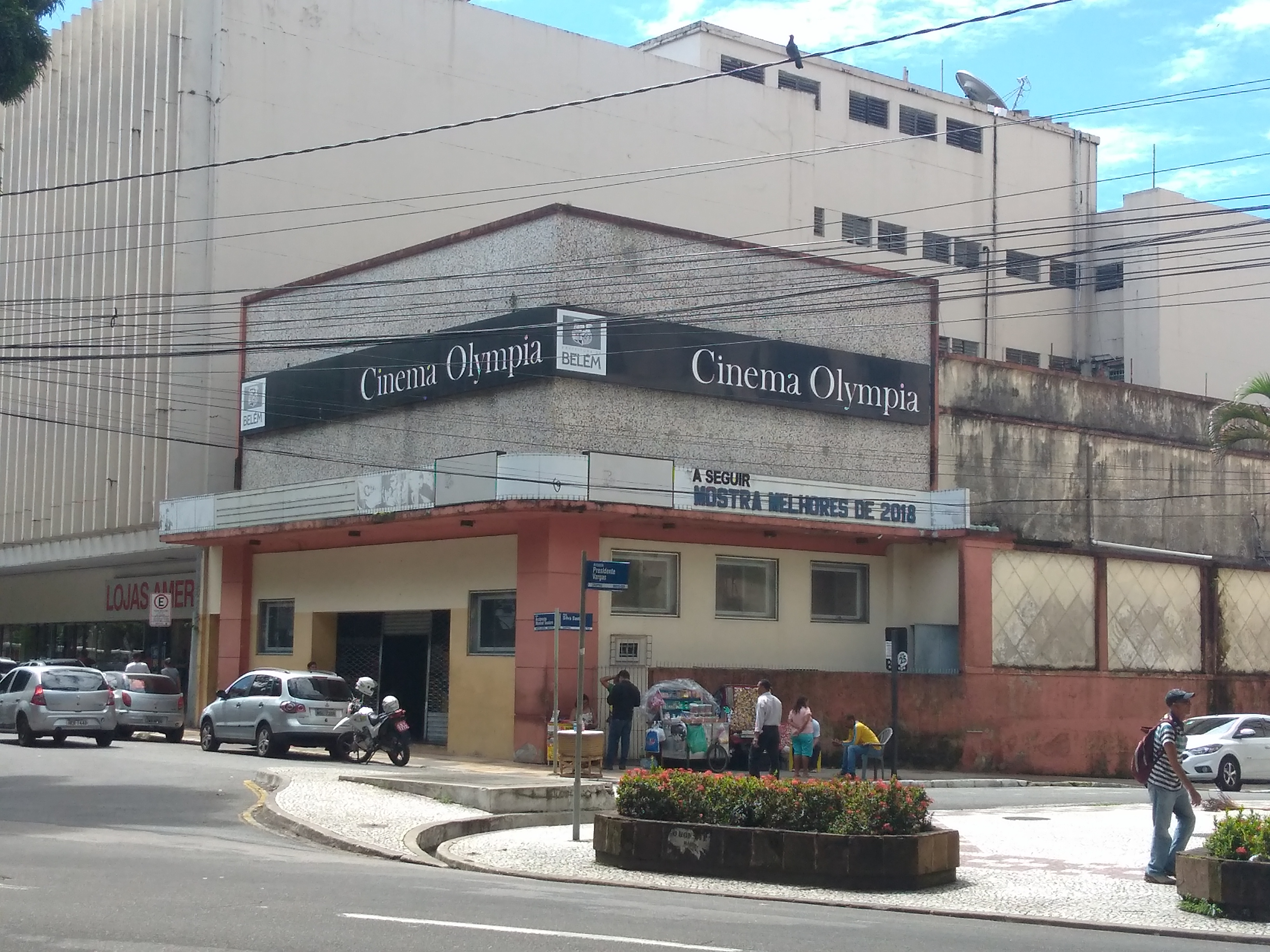
- View of the facade of Cine Olympia
- Interactive map of the Cine Olympia area
- Alternative names: Cine Olympia Municipal Space

General information
- Location: Belém, Pará; Brazil
- Coordinates: 1.453856°S 48.493272°W
- Inaugurated: April 24, 1912; 114 years ago
- Owner: Belém Cultural Foundation (FUNBEL)

Other information
- Seating capacity: 2738

The Cine Olympia, currently known as the Cine Olympia Municipal Space (Portuguese: Espaço Municipal Cine Olympia), is a movie theater that inaugurated in 1912 in the Campina district, in the Brazilian municipality of Belém, capital of the state of Pará.

Designed by Carlos Teixeira and Antonio Martins, it is the oldest operating cinema in Brazil. It is currently under the management of the Belém Cultural Foundation (FUNBEL).

The inauguration of this space during the Belle Époque period formed, along with the Bolonha Mansion, the Grande Hotel and the Theatro da Paz, the Polígono da Cultura, a conglomerate that gathered Belém's elite.

== History ==
=== Inauguration ===
Influenced by neoclassical architecture and the Belle Époque, the Olympia was inaugurated on April 24, 1912, during the government of Intendant Antônio Lemos, by businessmen Carlos Augusto Teixeira and Antonio Seabra de Almeida Martins, who owned the Teixeira Martins Company (administrator of the Grande Hotel, the Palace Theatre, now the Princesa Louçã Hotel, and other cinemas in Belém in the 1920s and 1930s).

At the beginning of the 20th century, Belém experienced a strong cultural influence from the United States and the European continent due to the connections caused by the export of rubber, which was starting to decline in Brazil. The founding of the Olympia is an example of this convergence of cultures. Created at the peak of silent film, it was considered one of the most modern and luxurious cinemas of its time.

The original architecture of the Olympia followed the neoclassical style, like the Theatro da Paz. The main facade was composed of arches with marble statues. The entrance floor was also marble, while the hall was decorated with Portuguese tiles. The box office faced the street. The chairs in the screening room were made of wood with cast iron sides and Art Nouveau decorations made in Scotland. The ceiling was decorated with soft motifs in plaster and lead, with iron lamps imported from France. The projectors were brought from Germany and the set of electric fans were imported from the United States to reduce the internal heat.

The Cine Olympia is the oldest operating movie theater in Brazil, given that its location has always been the same and it hasn't stopped its activities for a long time. Musical groups played concerts in the waiting room before movie screenings, something that didn't exist in other theaters in Belém. There was also an orchestra inside the cinema, which synchronized its music with the showing of silent film tapes.

Cine Olympia was responsible for screening the first spoken film in Pará, on November 30, 1930, with the American tape The Love Parade (1929).

=== 1930s and 1940s ===
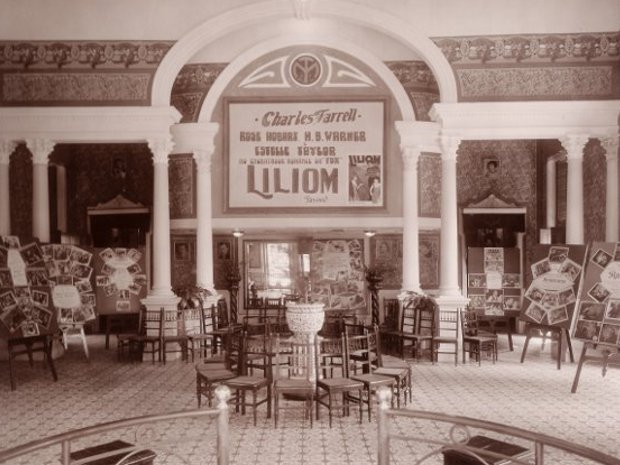
Former entrance hall of the Cine Olympia. The poster for the film Liliom (1930), starring Charles Ferrell, is displayed in the center.

At the end of the 1930s, Cine Olympia was sold to banker Adalberto Marques, who created Empresa Cinematográfica Paraense Ltda.

During this period, under the supervision of the architect Arlindo da Costa Guimarães, the Olympia underwent its first major renovation, which was completed on December 17, 1940; the facade was completely remodeled, the front arches were eliminated and a porch, which still exists today, was added. The front and side doors also adopted rectilinear shapes.

In 1946, all the cinemas of the Empresa Cinematográfica Paraense were sold to the company São Luiz Ltda, owned by businessman Luiz Severiano Ribeiro, who also managed an exhibition network that supplied the Northeast and extended to the North and Southeast (now called Kinoplex).

=== 1960s to the present ===
In the 1960s, the Cine Olympia underwent a second extensive renovation, which consisted of tiling the facade, creating two emergency doors (removing the side doors), replacing the old wooden and iron chairs and installing air conditioning. However, its physical structure was preserved.

With numerous economic and administrative difficulties, the Severiano Ribeiro Group, which used to run it as the São Luiz Company, almost closed the doors of the cinema in 2006. However, at the urging of society and artists in Belém, the City Council signed a contract with the owner of the building and reopened the location as a cultural space, under the administration of the Belém Cultural Foundation (FUNBEL).

The Olympia currently hosts festivals and screenings of classic films. In 2016, the renovation project was approved by the National Institute of Historic and Artistic Heritage (IPHAN) and included improvements to the exterior and interior, as well as the purchase of sound and digital projectors.

In 2020, the cinema closed its doors due to the COVID-19 pandemic and has remained so to this day. On April 24, 2023, the City Hall of Belém announced a restoration project and the purchase of new equipment.

== Program ==
Cine Olympia's program focuses on films outside the commercial circuit and admission is free. On its 107th anniversary, it presented a special program that included musical performances recalling the great soundtracks of cinema, as well as dance performances and a diverse program of films.

== See also ==
- History of Belém
- Feliz Lusitânia
- Ver-o-Peso Complex
- Brazilian Belle Époque
