= List of libraries in Brazil =

The following is a list of libraries in Brazil. The primary professional organization of librarians in the country is the Brazilian Federation of Associations of Librarians, Information Scientists and Institutions (Portuguese: Federação Brasileira de Associações de Bibliotecários, Cientistas da Informação e Instituições); they are additionally represented by the Brazilian Federal Council of Librarianship (Portuguese: Conselho Federal de Biblioteconomia at the government level.

== Libraries in Brazil ==
- Biblioteca Nacional do Rio de Janeiro
- Sistema Integrado de Bibliotecas da USP, São Paulo ^{pt}
- Sistema de Bibliotecas e Informação da UFRJ, Rio de Janeiro
- Biblioteca Mário de Andrade, São Paulo
- Biblioteca Central (UnB), Brasília
- Sistema de Bibliotecas da UFMG, Minas Gerais
- Sistema de Bibliotecas da Unicamp, São Paulo
- Sistema de Bibliotecas da UFPE, Pernambuco
- Sistema Universitário de Bibliotecas da Universidade Federal da Bahia
- Biblioteca Pública Arthur Vianna, Pará
- Biblioteca Pública do Estado da Bahia
- Biblioteca Pública do Estado de Pernambuco
- Biblioteca Pública do Paraná
- Biblioteca Comunitária da UFSCar, São Paulo
- Biblioteca Pública Estadual Luiz de Bessa, Minas Gerais
- Biblioteca Pública do Estado do Rio Grande do Sul
- Biblioteca Pública Epiphânio Dória, Sergipe
- Amazonas Public Library
- Biblioteca Pública Benedito Leite, Maranhão
- Biblioteca Comunitária Carlos Castelo Branco - UFPI, Piauí
- Biblioteca Municipal Orígenes Lessa, São Paulo
- Biblioteca Pública Governador Menezes Pimentel, Ceará
- Biblioteca Pública do Estado de Santa Catarina
- Biblioteca Nacional de Brasília
- Biblioteca Pública do Estado da Paraíba
- Biblioteca Pública do Estado de Alagoas
- Biblioteca Estadual do Acre
- Biblioteca Pública Estadual Pio Vargas, Goiás
- Biblioteca Pública Câmara Cascudo, Rio Grande do Norte
- Biblioteca Parque Estadual, Rio de Janeiro
- Biblioteca Pública de Brasília
- Biblioteca Pública Estadual Elcy Lacerda, Amapá
- Biblioteca Amadeu Amaral, São Paulo
- Biblioteca Pública Estadual Estevão de Mendonça, Mato Grosso
- Biblioteca Publica Estadual Doutor Isaías Paim, Mato Grosso do Sul
- Biblioteca Municipal de Ipatinga, Minas Gerais
- Biblioteca Pública Estadual Levy Cúrcio da Rocha, Espírito Santo
- Biblioteca Estadual do Piauí
- Biblioteca Euclides da Cunha, São Paulo
- Biblioteca Pública Estadual Darcy Cardeal, Tocantins
- Biblioteca Pública do Estado de Roraima

== See also ==
- Brazilian literature
- History of the book in Brazil
- History of libraries in Latin America
- List of archives in Brazil

in Portuguese

- List of the largest public libraries in Brazil in Portuguese
- National Book Institute, Brazil (in Portuguese)
