= Mário de Andrade Library =

Library in São Paulo, Brazil

Coordinates: 23.5477°S 46.6418°W

Biblioteca Mário de Andrade
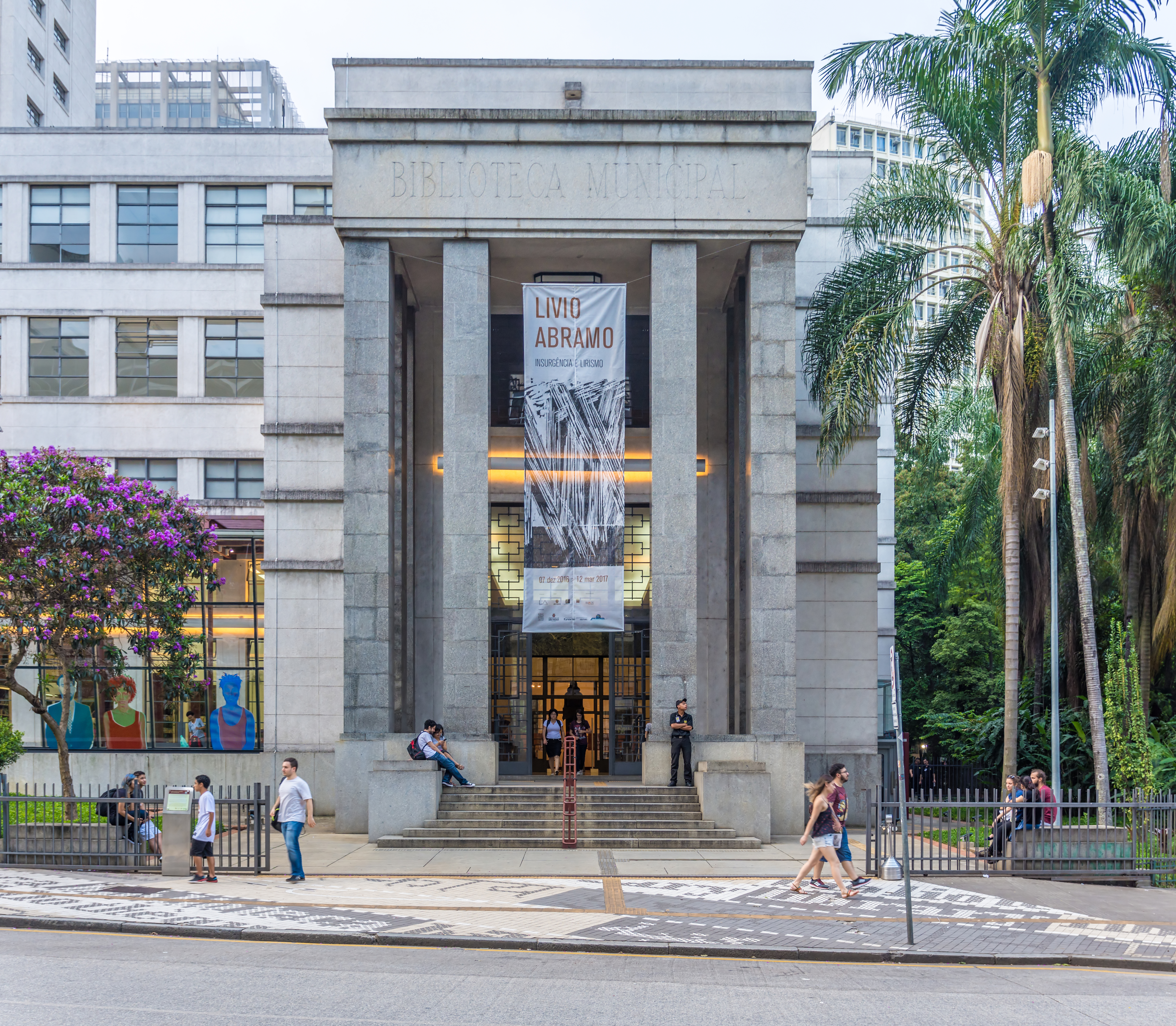
- Location: São Paulo, Brazil
- Established: 1925

Collection
- Size: 3,200,000 Items

Access and use
- Population served: open to the public

Other information
- Website: Official site

The Mário de Andrade Library (in Portuguese: Biblioteca Mário de Andrade; BMA) is the largest public library in the city of São Paulo, Brazil. Founded in 1925, with a donation of holdings by the library of the city's Câmara Municipal, it became one of the most important cultural institutions in Brazil, as well as one of the leading research libraries in the country. It is named in honor of Mário de Andrade, one of the founders of Brazilian modernism. It is housed in an Art Deco building in the historical downtown, considered one of the icons of this style in the city.

Mário de Andrade Library was the first Brazilian public institution interested in acquiring modern works of art of local and foreign artists (which are placed today in the Pinacoteca Municipal). It has been a member of United Nations depository libraries system since 1958, though it started receiving UN material nine years earlier, in 1949. During Sérgio Milliet's administration, the library would have a very large participation in São Paulo intellectual sets. Later, the library would be frequented by academics as Fernando Henrique Cardoso and Marilena Chaui.

Sheltering the second largest bibliographic and documental heritage of Brazil — only after the National Library in Rio de Janeiro — the Mário de Andrade Library is the depository of all artistic and cultural registers of the city of São Paulo. Its collection includes about 3.2 million items, covering all areas of the knowledge — amongst which a distinct assemblage of over 60,000 rare books, manuscripts, incunabula, maps, prints, brasiliana and others, produced between 15th and 19th centuries.

The library has branches throughout the city, providing circulating materials to general public.

On 7 December 2025, eight engravings by Henri Matisse and five works of Candido Portinari were stolen following a heist at the library. The Matisse engravings were recovered by police at a residence in São Bernardo do Campo on 13 August 2026, resulting in one arrest.

== See also ==
- National Library of Brazil
- List of libraries in Brazil
