= Confeitaria Colombo =

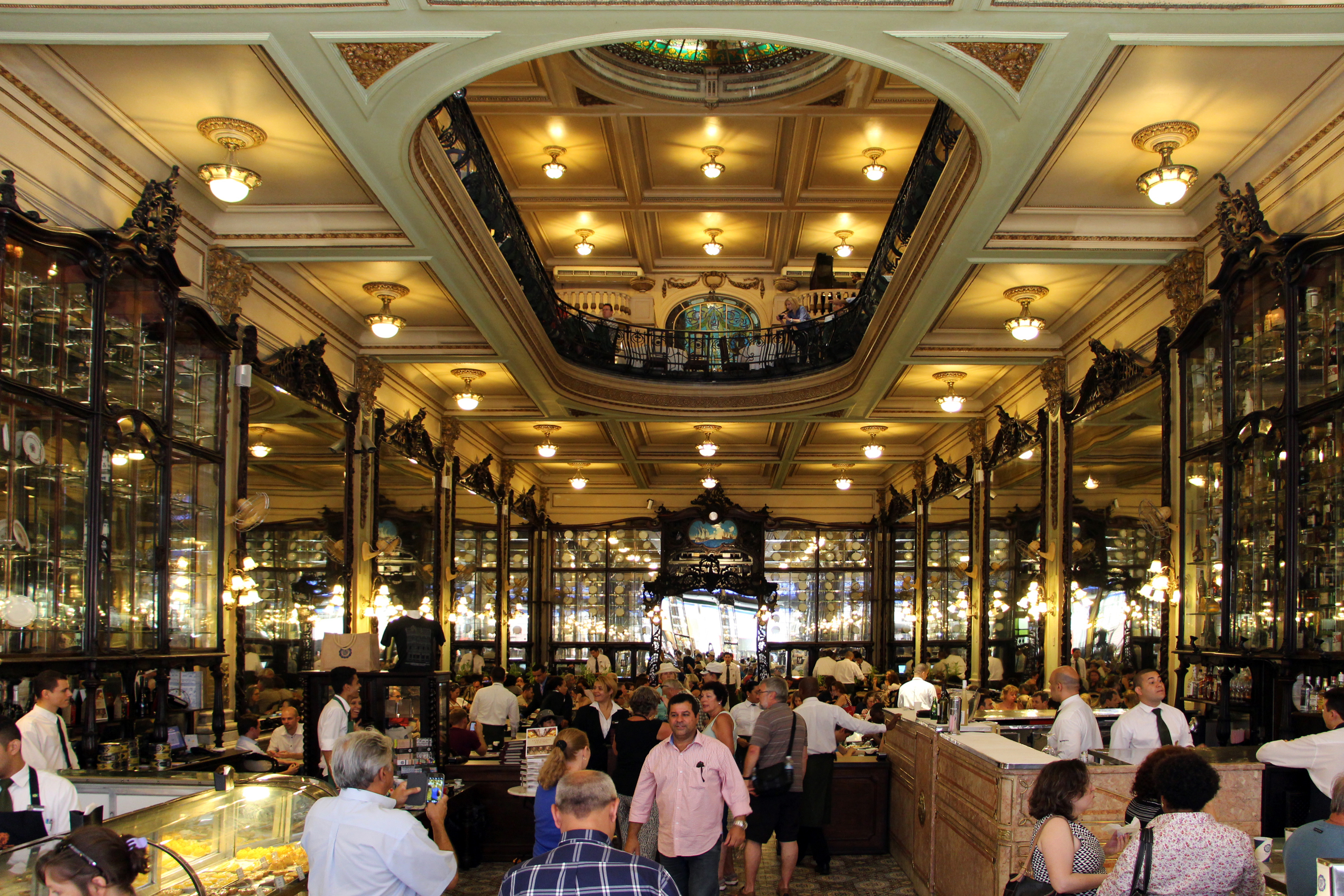

Restaurant information
- Established: 1894
- Location: Rua Gonçalves Dias, 32, Rio de Janeiro, Brazil
- Coordinates: 22°54′18″S 43°10′44″W
- Website: www.confeitariacolombo.com.br

Confeitaria Colombo is a coffeehouse located in downtown Rio de Janeiro, Brazil. It is one of the main landmarks of the city's Central Region. Website City Guides named Colombo one of the 10 most beautiful cafés in the world.

== History ==
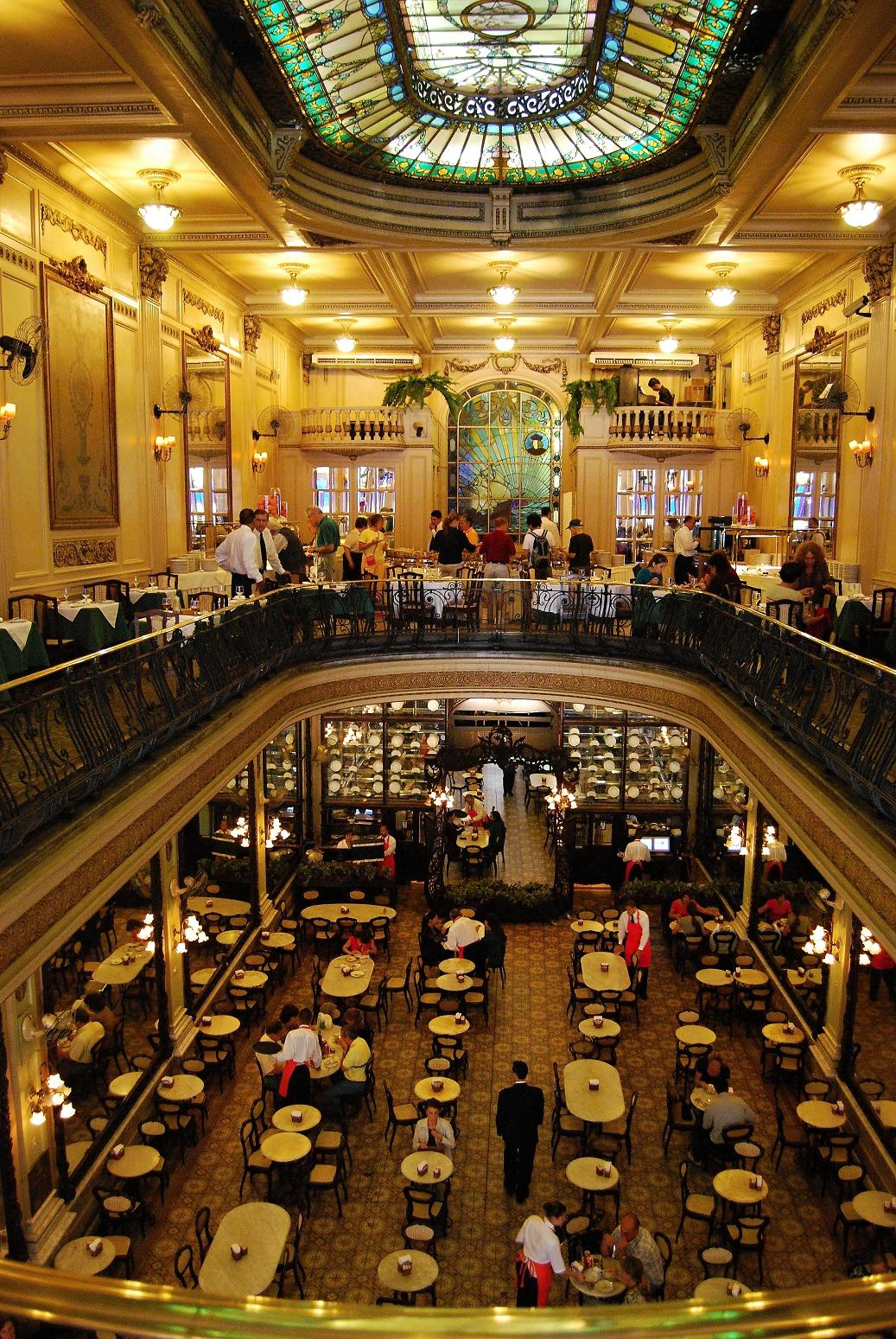
Interior of Confeitaria Colombo.

Confeitaria Colombo was founded in 1894 by Portuguese immigrants Joaquim Borges de Meireles and Manuel José Lebrão. Its architecture, inspired by the European cafes, was representative of Rio de Janeiro's belle époque. Between 1912 and 1918, the interior halls were renovated with an Art Nouveau flair, with large crystal mirrors brought from Antwerp, framed by rosewood trim friezes. The interior wooden furniture was carved at the same time by the artisan Antonio Borsoi.

In 1922, its facilities were expanded with the construction of a second floor with a tearoom. An opening in the ceiling of the ground floor allows to see the skylight of the tea room, decorated with stained glass. Currently, the second floor houses the restaurant Cristóvão.

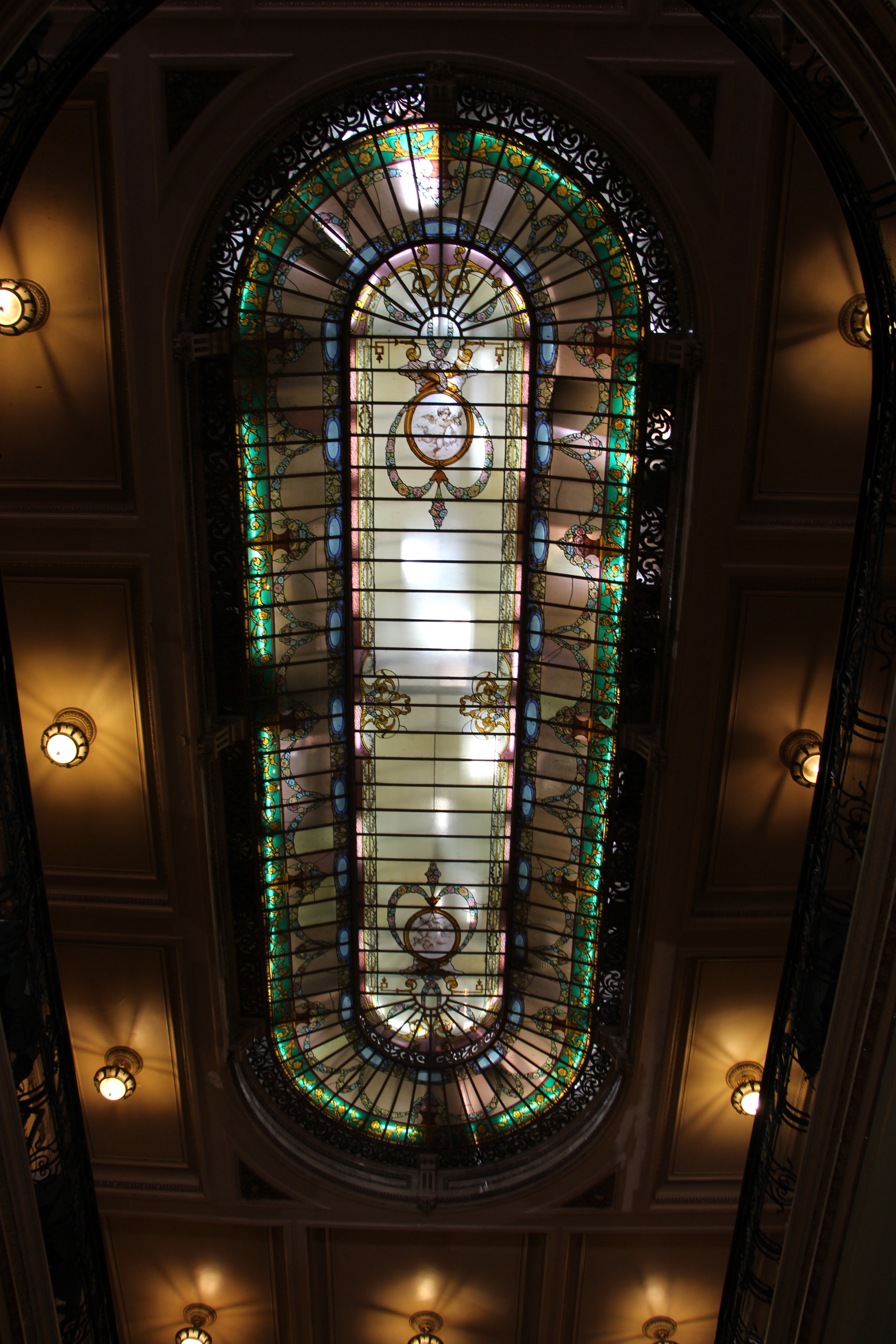
Colombo's stained glass ceiling at the second floor

Years after its opening, Colombo became a meeting point for Brazilian writers, artists and intellectuals of the time, such as Chiquinha Gonzaga, Olavo Bilac, Emílio de Meneses, Rui Barbosa, Villa-Lobos, Lima Barreto, José do Patrocínio, among others, being called "a branch of the Brazilian Academy of Letters".

The coffeehouse was also visited by heads of state such as Getúlio Vargas, Juscelino Kubitschek, King Albert I of Belgium and Queen Elizabeth II.

=== Branches ===
In 1944, Colombo opened a second store in Copacabana, at the corner of Avenida Nossa Senhora de Copacabana with Rua Barão de Ipanema. It ran until 2003, when it moved to Fort Copacabana. It also had a store at Barra Shopping in the 1990 decade.

== See also ==
- Casa Cavé
