= Casa Cavé =

Confectionery in Rio de Janeiro, Brazil

Coordinates: 22°54′21″S 43°10′45″W

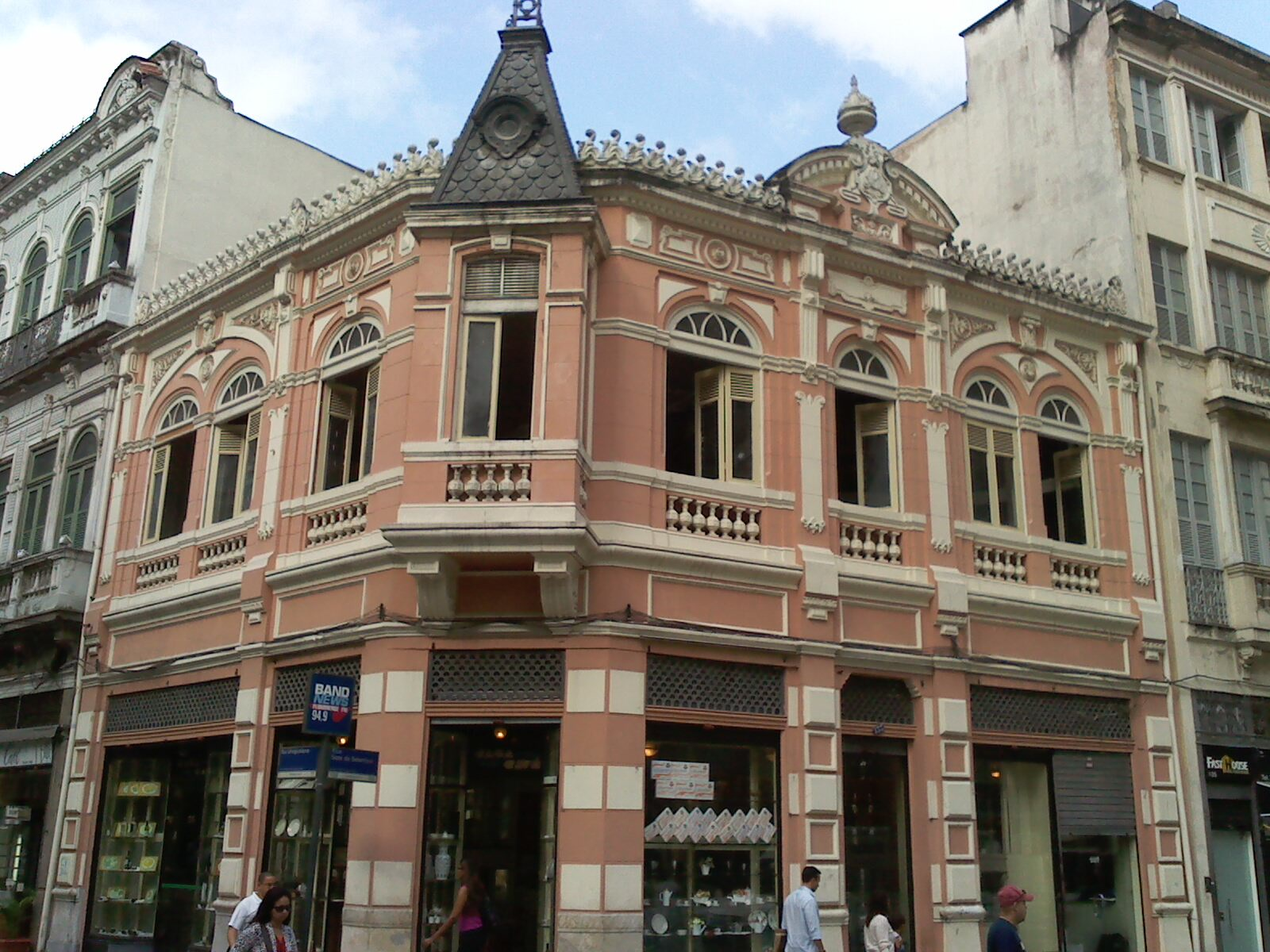
Facade of Casa Cavé.

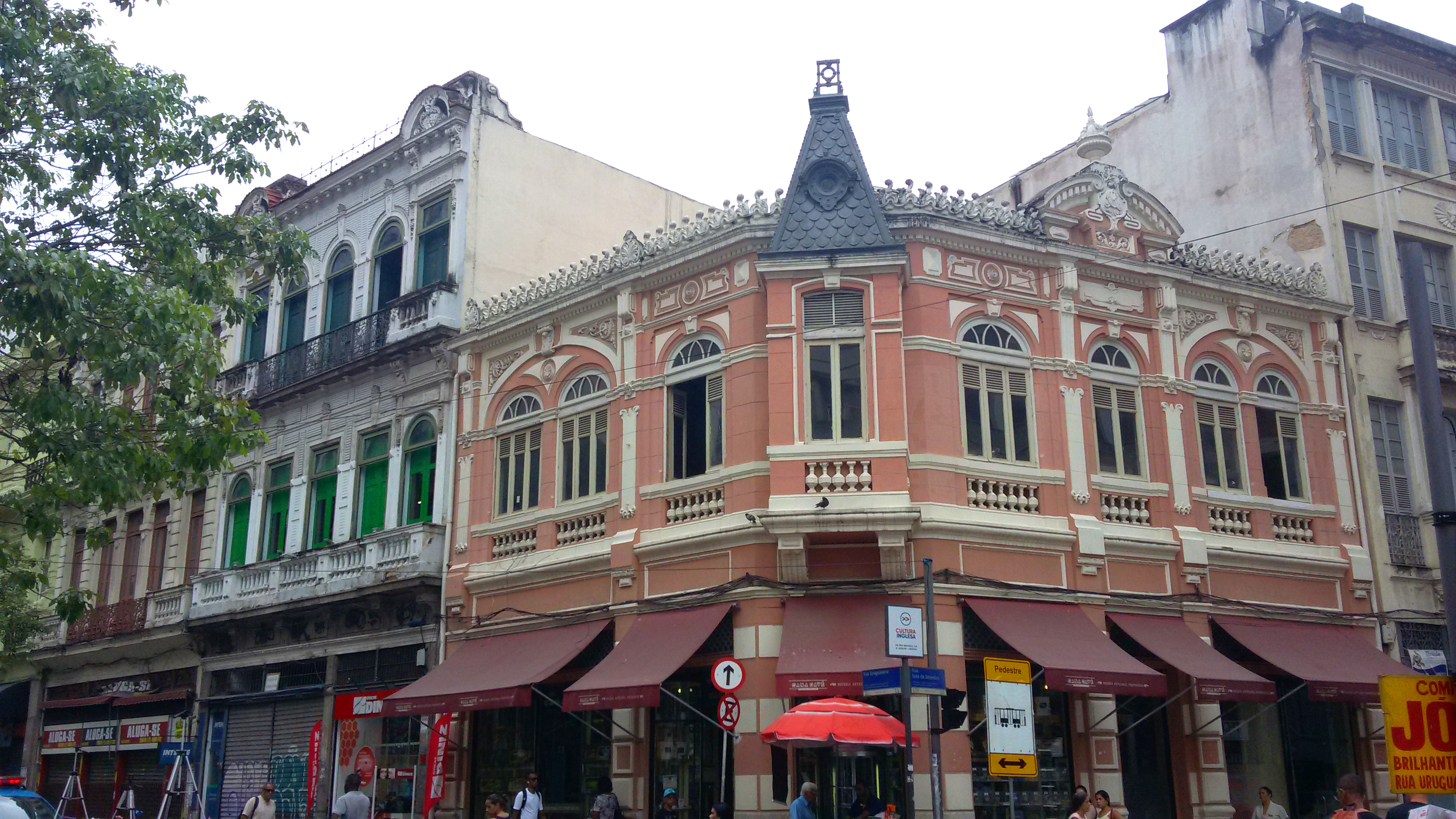
Facade of Casa Cavé.

Casa Cavé, or simply Cavé, is a confectionery located on Sete de Setembro Street, in the city center of Rio de Janeiro, Brazil. It is one of the city's most traditional patisseries.

== History ==
On March 5, 1860, Auguste Charles Felix Cavé, a French immigrant, founded Casa Cavé, the oldest confectionery in the city of Rio de Janeiro. He ran the business until 1922. The building, located on the corner of Sete de Setembro and Uruguaiana streets in the city center, stands out for its architecture, which includes French chandeliers, stained glass and windows; chairs, wooden tables and gouache paintings on glass plates designed by Francisco Puig Domenech Colom, a Spanish immigrant living in Brazil; and Brazilian luminaires.

The menu included bowls of ice cream decorated with different shapes such as chickens and pyramids, and baskets of peaches. The European-influenced architecture, prevalent during the Brazilian Belle Époque, converted the confectionery into an elegant space, attracting the high society of Rio de Janeiro. In 1980, as the centenary of Casa Cavé's foundation approached, the conservation of its architectural legacy became a problem for the owners. At this time, the City Council instituted the "cultural corridor" project, aimed at protecting and registering several historic buildings in the center of Rio de Janeiro. As a result, it was not possible to extend the kitchen of the house, which was required but forbidden due to the building's conservation status.

In 2000, the company temporarily closed its doors at the former address and reopened in a nearby building. Between 2007 and 2014, the historic building was temporarily occupied by Manon, a traditional bakery in the city. In 2015, Casa Cavé returned to its former location.

== See also ==
- Confeitaria Colombo
