= Provincial Palace =

Historic building in Manaus, Amazonas, Brazil

- Palacete Provincial
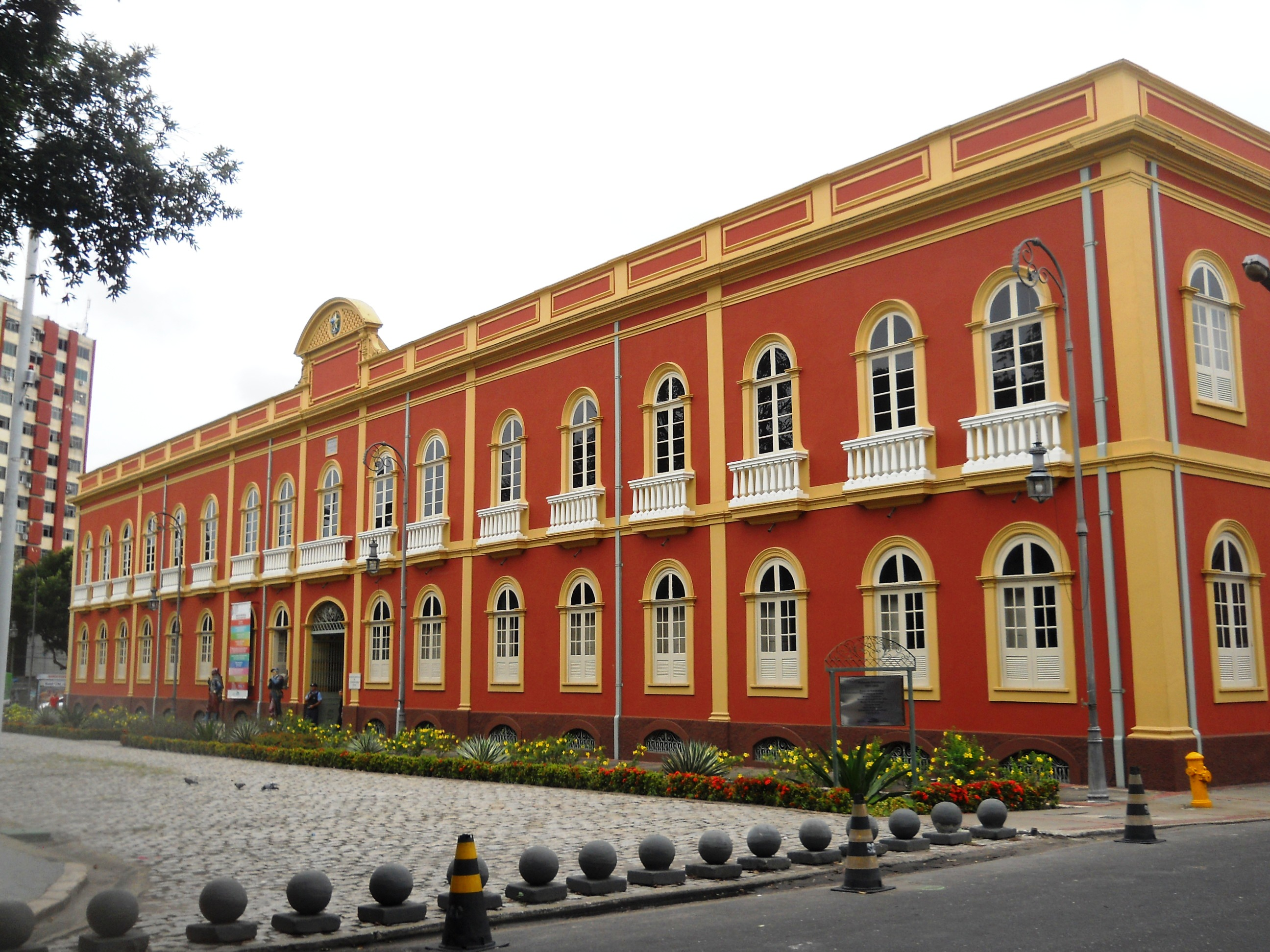
- Main facade

- Location within Brazil
- Former names: Amazon Military Police Headquarter
- Alternative names: Archaeology Museum; Pinacoteca do Estado do Amazonas; Amazonas Museum of Image and Sound; Tiradentes Museum; Bernardo Ramos Museum of Numismatics

General information
- Type: Palace
- Architectural style: Eclecticism
- Location: Manaus, Amazonas; Brazil
- Coordinates: 03°08′07.45″S 60°01′16″W
- Construction started: 1861
- Construction stopped: 1874
- Inaugurated: February 28, 1875; 151 years ago
- Owner: Amazonas State Government

Height
- Height: 10m

Technical details
- Floor area: 13 000 m²

Website
- https://cultura.am.gov.br/espacos-culturais/museus/palacete-provincial/

The Provincial Palace (Portuguese: Palacete Provincial) is located in the historic center of the city of Manaus, capital of the state of Amazonas. It is a centenary building where important events related to the social and political life of the people of Amazonas occurred.

Officially opened in 1875, the building was the seat of government and the residence of the presidents of the Province of Amazonas until 1888. It served as the Amazon Military Police Headquarter for more than 100 years and is currently run by the Amazonas Secretariat for Culture (SEC).

In 2005, the Provincial Palace underwent restoration work and was reopened in 2009 as a space for free public visits, attracting visitors interested in getting to know the museums' art collections, as well as taking part in the cultural events that take place there. Located on Heliodoro Balbi Square, better known as Police Square, the palace receives around 145,000 guests a year.

Today, the building houses a group of five museums of different styles: the Archaeology Museum, the Amazonas Museum of Image and Sound (MISAM), the Bernardo Ramos Museum of Numismatics, the Tiradentes Museum and the Pinacoteca do Estado do Amazonas.

== History ==
Construction of the property began in 1861 by the Portuguese merchant Alexandre Paulo de Brito Amorim to serve as a residence for his family, but he did not finalize the construction. The building was bought by Custódio Garcia, captain of the National Guard, and then sold to José Bernardo Michellis, president of the province.

The work was completed on March 25, 1874, and, until 1875, the palace simultaneously housed several public offices: the Provincial Assembly, the Public Works Department, the Public Library and the Liceu Provincial, now the Colégio Amazonense D. Pedro II.

The Provincial Palace was officially inaugurated on February 28, 1875, almost a year after it had been completed, and until 1888 it served as the residence of the presidents of the Province of Amazonas.

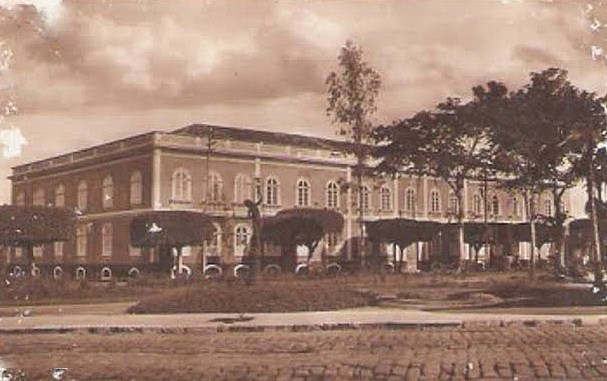
Provincial Palace in the 19th century.

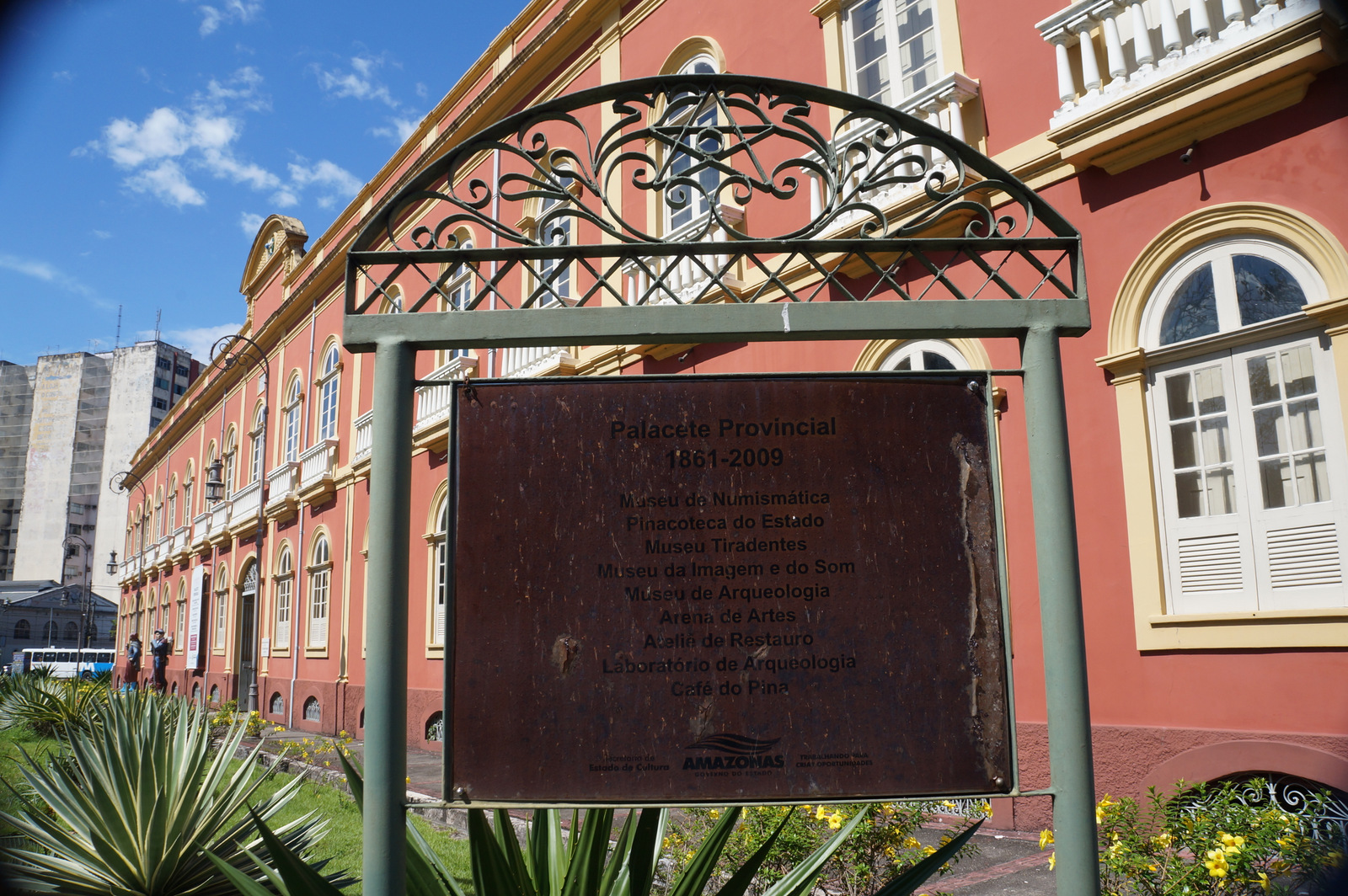
A sign at the entrance to the Provincial Palace indicates that the building dates from 1861.

Between the end of the 19th century and the first decades of the 20th century, the city of Manaus, like the other capitals of the Amazon region, experienced a period of great prosperity driven by the rubber cycle. This historical situation would have a great impact on the development of the city's artistic and cultural environment (the greatest symbol of which would be the construction of the luxurious Amazon Theatre, inaugurated in 1896), stimulating the arrival of artists, photographers and architects from other parts of Brazil and other countries, especially Italy, attracted by the job market. Painters such as Crispim do Amaral, Fernandes Machado, Aurélio de Figueiredo and Antônio Parreiras would spend long periods of time in the city executing a large number of works requested by wealthy families and public authorities. The incentive for artistic development was finally consolidated with the adoption of art education in public schools (such as the Ginásio Amazonense, where Manoel Santiago studied) and the foundation of the Academia Amazonense de Belas Artes.

However, the growing competition from African and Asian rubber plantations and the end of the World War I led to the collapse of the rubber cycle, which resulted in the economic decline of Brazil's producing regions and, consequently, a reduction in artistic and cultural events in Manaus. Decades later, the city would once again witness some cultural movement through the activities of the Clube da Madrugada. With an anarchic-libertarian ideology, the club was created by painters Moacir Andrade, Afrânio de Castro, Oscar Ramos and Anísio Mello, and writers Antístenes Pinto, Alencar e Silva and Jorge Tufic, with the aim of promoting a series of avant-garde actions in the fields of visual arts and literature.

In the field of visual arts, the Clube da Madrugada has organized the Madrugada Salons and Plastic Arts Fairs, as well as sponsoring individual and collective exhibitions by artists from Amazonas. In this context, the idea of creating a permanent museological space for the dissemination and preservation of the region's artistic heritage arose. Moacir de Andrade had been pursuing this project since the early 1950s and on several occasions expressed it to the historian Artur César Ferreira Reis. In 1964, after the military coup, Artur Reis was appointed by General Castelo Branco as the new governor of Amazonas, replacing Plínio Ramos Coelho. The following year, on July 18, 1965, he established the Pinacoteca do Estado do Amazonas by means of Law No. 233.

Initially, the Pinacoteca was housed in a room in the right wing of the Amazonas Public Library building, on Barroso Street, with a total collection of 90 works of art, including paintings, drawings, engravings and sculptures. Moacir de Andrade was the institution's first director, succeeded by Álvaro Páscoa, Afrânio de Castro and Helena Gentil. After it was founded, the institution hosted meetings of the Clube da Madrugada and became an important regional center for artistic training. The Pinacoteca organized workshops in drawing (Manoel Borges), painting (Moacir Andrade), art history and woodcut (Álvaro Páscoa). Álvaro Páscoa's work as a teacher at the Pinacoteca is particularly noteworthy, since he was responsible for training a whole generation of contemporary artists, such as Hahnemann Bacelar, Enéas Valle, Zeca Nazaré, Van Pereira, Thyrso Muñoz and Jair Jacqmont; the latter became the institution's director in the 1990s.

== Museums ==
=== Archaeology Museum ===
The Archaeology Museum opened on March 25, 2009. Essentially educational, it presents evidence of the material culture of immemorial human groups who lived in the area, along with banners with texts and photos explaining "archaeological activity" in the field. Visitors are introduced to some of the techniques used in an excavation and get to see how cultural evidence of extinct peoples is found by archaeologists, as well as some of the equipment used by them in the field.

Evidence of archaeological material culture from archaeological sites in the state of Amazonas can also be found. The main objective is to show the visiting public a little of the pre-colonial knowledge, from an anthropological and artistic perspective, of the peoples who lived in the region and bequeathed the most diverse forms of cultural expression. The exhibition includes the Anthropozoormorphic Statuette, given to the Museum by the Geographic and Historic Institute of Amazonas (IGHA).

=== Amazonas Museum of Image and Sound (MISAM) ===
Inaugurated on November 6, 2000, its collections are composed of donations from several organizations and collectors, as well as direct acquisitions from the State Department of Culture, which keeps institutional documents produced by the agency itself. The museum houses material relating to cinema, photography, music, television, radio and other types of visual arts technology.

=== Bernardo Ramos Museum of Numismatics ===
It includes more than 17,000 items from Bernardo de Azevedo da Silva Ramos' personal collection, including coins, banknotes, medals and national and international decorations.

=== Tiradentes Museum ===
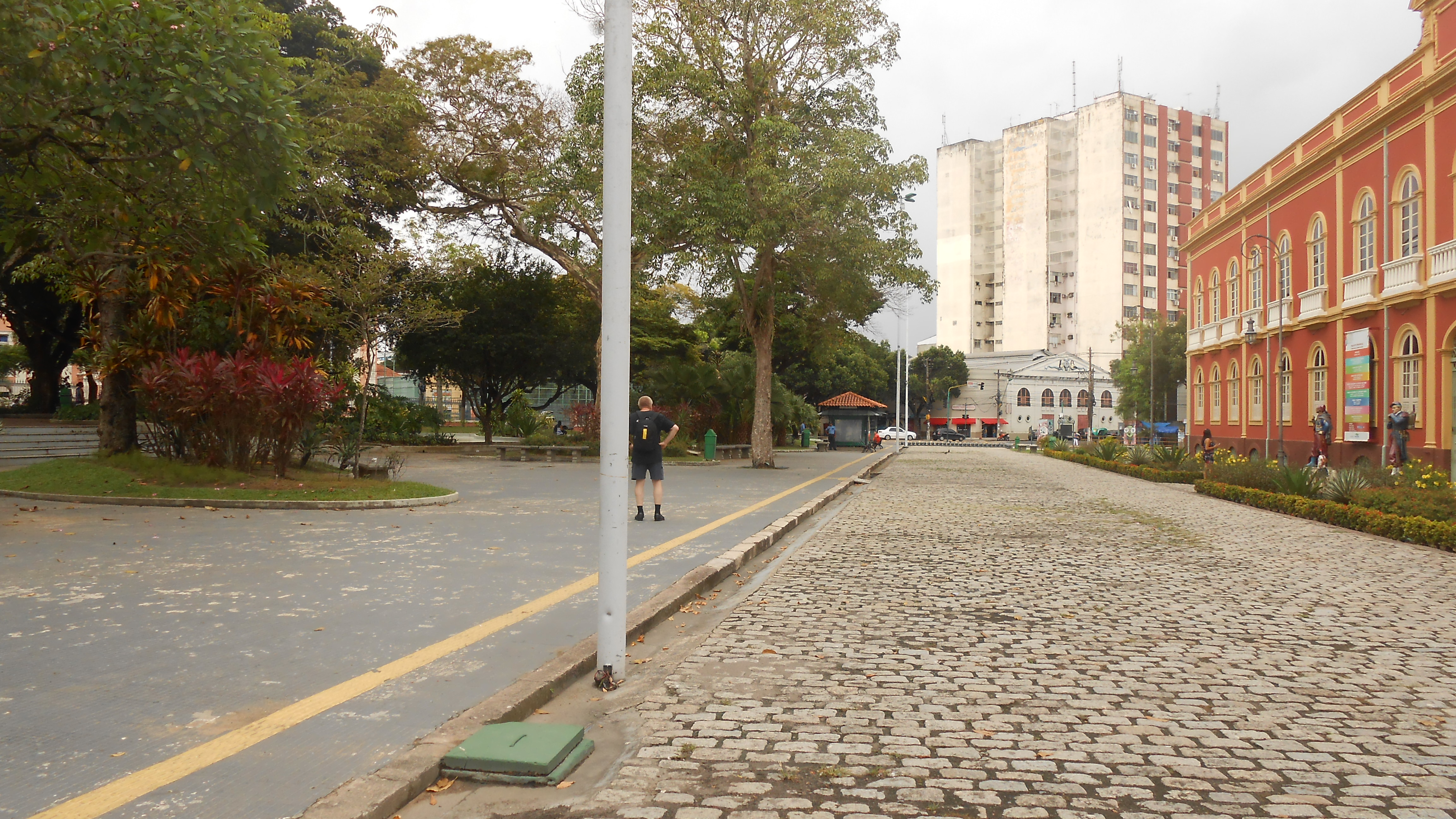
Heliodoro Balbi Square, better known as Police Square.

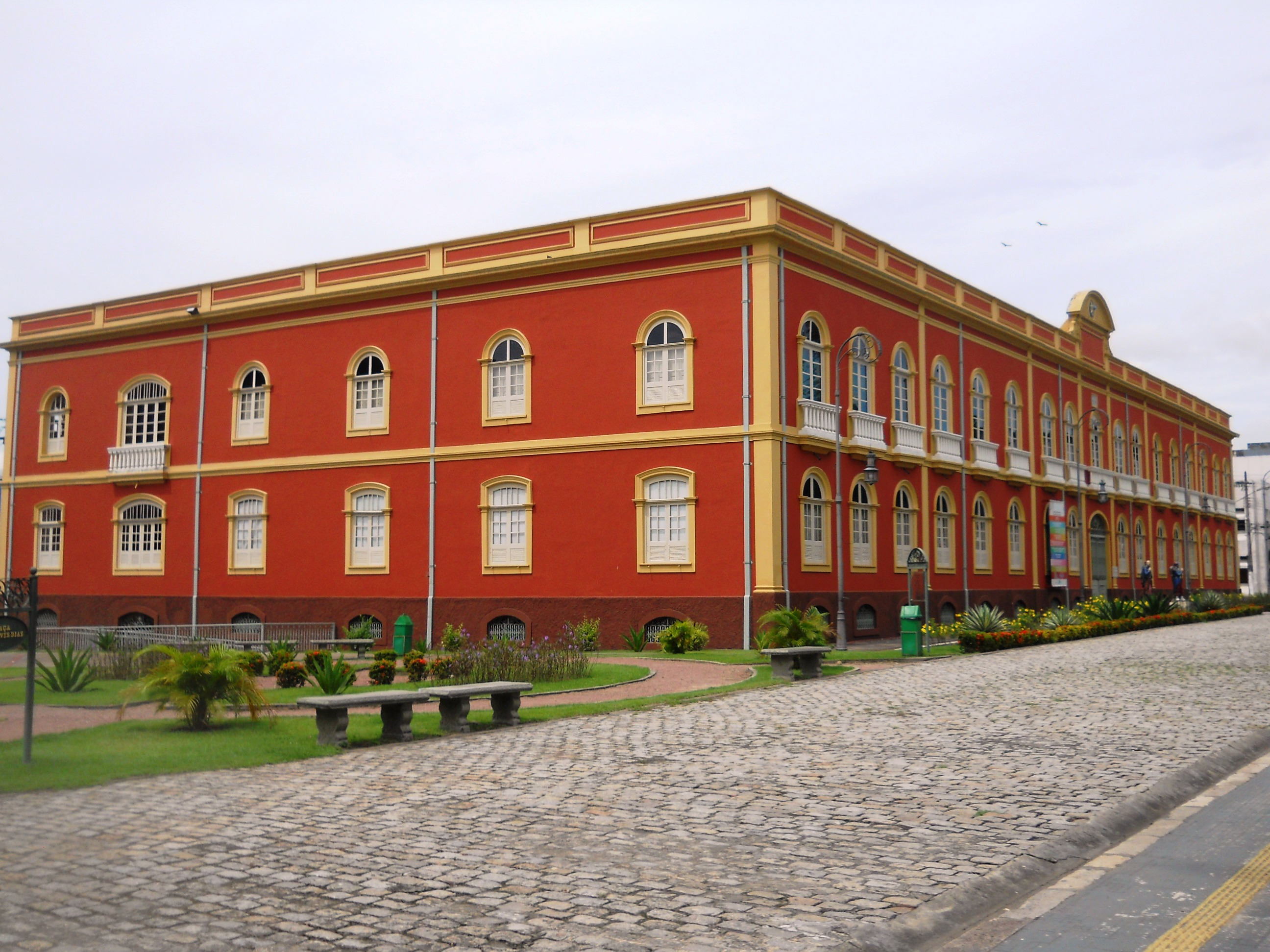
The Provincial Palace and the Police Square.

It presents the history of the Amazonas Military Police, with original furniture from the time, as well as an integrated archive with individual notebooks of members of the organization, along with weapons, uniforms, armor from the 16th century and equipment used by the State Fire Department. In the "Flagrant of History" exhibition, visitors will be able to watch videos of festive events and hear the sound of some weapons.

==== History ====
It was organized and inaugurated in 1984 on the initiative of the then commander-in-chief of the Amazonas Military Police, Colonel Elcio Motta, under the technical guidance of the Joaquim Nabuco Foundation. Its first headquarters were in a room on the first floor of the General Command of the Military Police in Heliodoro Balbi Square, in Manaus; in 2009, the museum was reinstalled in the Provincial Palace. It represents an important part of the history of the state of Amazonas and the corporation to which it belongs, preserving and providing society with the entity's historical collection, which consists of dozens of objects, such as: old weapons, Fire Department equipment, uniforms, badges and decorations, documents, photographs and more.

=== Pinacoteca do Estado do Amazonas ===
The Pinacoteca do Estado do Amazonas is a state public institution, subordinate to the Amazonas Secretariat of Culture. It was officially established on July 18, 1965, during the government of Artur César Ferreira Reis, as the result of an initiative that had been nurtured since the 1950s by a group of intellectuals linked to the Clube da Madrugada, specifically Moacir de Andrade. In the following decades, it stood out for its didactic work in the formation of a whole generation of contemporary artists of regional expression.

The Pinacoteca has a collection of more than a thousand pieces of different techniques that cover Brazilian artistic production between the 19th and 20th centuries, with a special focus on artists from Amazonas. It also keeps a teaching collection of copies of famous works of universal art, promotes permanent and temporary exhibitions and organizes several cultural events.

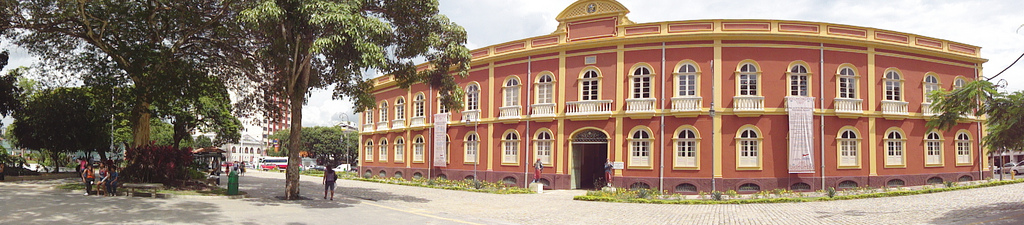
Panorama of the Provincial Palace.

==== Collection ====
The Pinacoteca preserves a collection of approximately 1,000 works, including paintings, sculptures, drawings and engravings, created by around 300 artists from Amazonas, Brazil and abroad. The collection offers a panorama of Brazilian artistic production between the 19th and 20th centuries, illustrated especially by works from regional artists.

19th century academism and the transition phase from the 19th to the 20th century is represented by works by painters who were very significant for Brazilian art. The canvas O último baile da Ilha Fiscal, by Aurélio de Figueiredo, a preliminary version of the work of the same name preserved in the National Historical Museum in Rio de Janeiro, is noteworthy. O banho de Ceci, also by Figueiredo, is an example of Indianism. The collection includes some of the most famous historical paintings by Joaquim Fernandes Machado, such as A Glória coroando Gonçalves Dias and Primeiro voo de Santos Dumont. By Antônio Parreiras, the museum preserves the oils Quarta-feira de cinzas and Caçador furtivo, probably acquired by the state government during the artist's exhibition at the Rio Negro Palace in 1905. There are also works by Eliseu Visconti, Sólon Botelho and Darkir Parreiras, among others.

Modernism is represented by a group of works by Alfredo Volpi, Cícero Dias, Inimá de Paula, Aldemir Martins and Burle Marx, as well as the oil Curupira, by Manoel Santiago, from Amazonas, representative of the nationalist painting of the 1930s. The works of Oscar Ramos, Álvaro Páscoa, Anísio Mello and Hahnemann Bacelar exemplify the assimilation of the legacy of the Modern Art Week in Manaus in the 50s and 60s. Among the representatives of naïve art, Francisco da Silva from Acre and Rita Loureiro from Manaus deserve a mention. Anna Letycia Quadros, Dirso José de Oliveira and Roberto De Lamonica also stand out.

In the contemporary art segment, there are works by artists of national expression (Adhemar Guerra, Acácio Sobral, Antônio Dias, Emmanuel Nassar, Dora Basílio, etc.) and regional expression (Afrânio de Araújo Castro, Eli Bacelar da Silva, Jefferson Rebelo, Sebastião Alves, Cristóvão Coutinho, Oscar Ramos, Claudson Mota de Ouro, Manoel Borges, etc.).

The Pinacoteca do Estado also has a teaching collection of copies of famous works of universal art. There are 70 paintings and 20 sculptures, currently on display at the Casa da Cultura on Instalação Street, which cover various periods and important authors in the history of art.

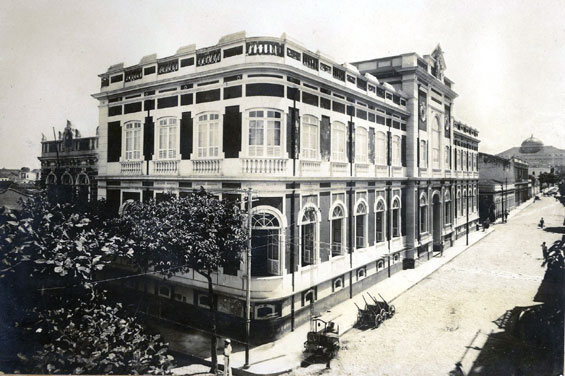
Building of the Amazonas Public Library, first headquarters of the Pinacoteca do Estado.

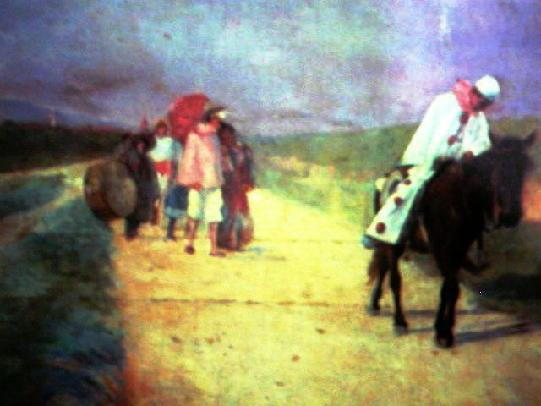
Antônio Parreiras - Quarta-feira de cinzas (1904). Collection of the Pinacoteca do Amazonas.

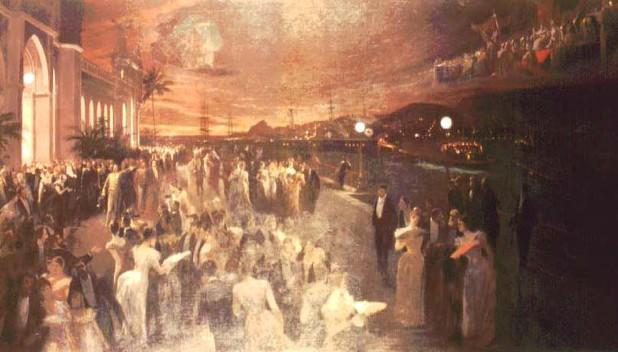
Aurélio de Figueiredo - O último baile da Ilha Fiscal (1905). Collection of the Pinacoteca do Amazonas.

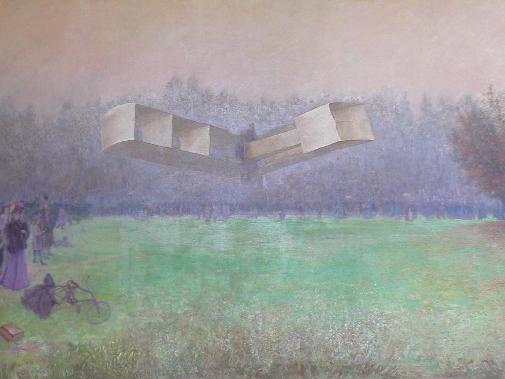
Joaquim Fernandes Machado - O primeiro voo de Santos Dumont (c. 1906). Collection of the Pinacoteca do Amazonas.

== See also ==
- Amazon Theatre
- Mercado Adolpho Lisboa
- Monument Abertura dos Portos
- Church of Saint Sebastian
- Amazonas Public Library
