= Amazonas Public Library =

Public library in Manaus, Amazonas, Brazil

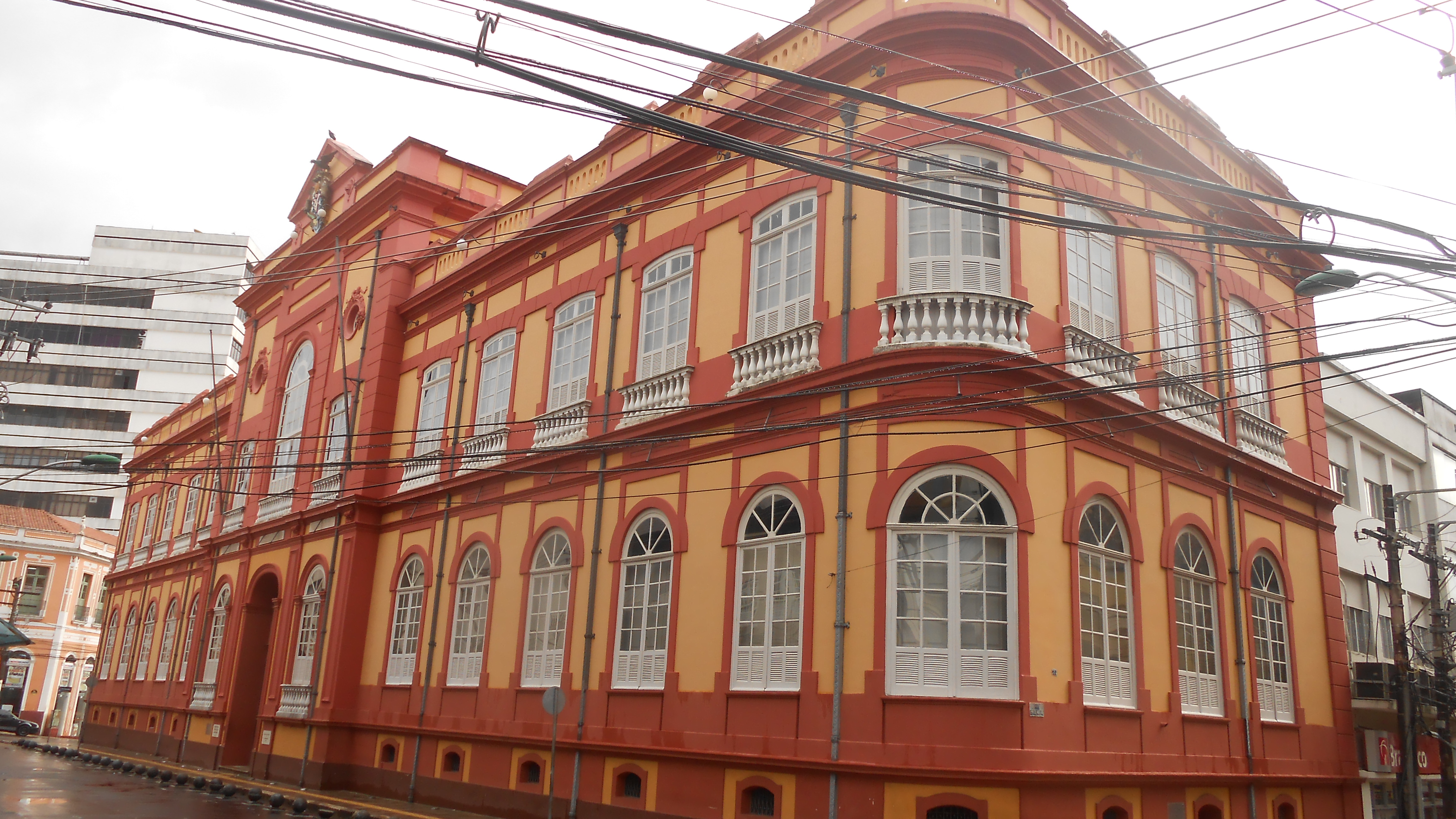
- Library headquarters
- 03°08′03.60″S 60°01′24″W
- Location: Manaus, Amazonas; Brazil
- Type: State library
- Established: March 19, 1871; 154 years ago

Collection
- Size: 35000 items

Access and use
- Access requirements: Register of readers, regulars and admirers.

Other information
- Website: https://cultura.am.gov.br/espacos-culturais/bibliotecas/biblioteca-publica/

The Amazonas Public Library (Portuguese: Biblioteca Pública do Amazonas) is located in the center of the city of Manaus, the capital of Amazonas. Founded in 1871, it is the oldest public library in the state and the largest in terms of collections.

The library contains rare works, old periodicals, and academic materials. The current building, located on Barroso Street, on the corner with Sete de Setembro Avenue, was constructed between 1904 and 1912. It was almost destroyed by a fire in 1945., and was rebuilt two years later. It received a partial restoration in 1985 and a more complete one in 2013, when it reopened to the public.

The second floor houses the Lourenço Pessoa Hall, has over 30,000 newspapers that date back to 1886, and the Maria Luiza de Magalhães Cordeiro Hall, which houses the Gibiteca, with comics, and the Telecenter, where visitors can use the internet to study.

== History ==
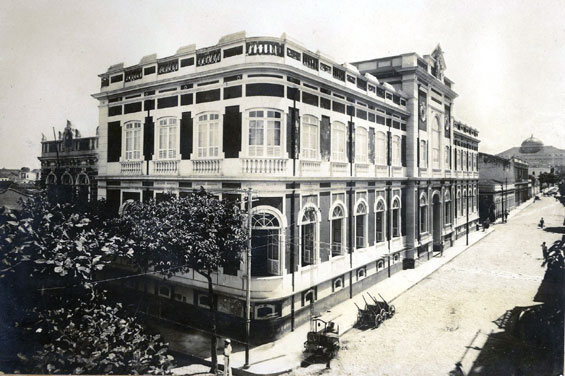
The Amazonas Public Library (c. 1900).

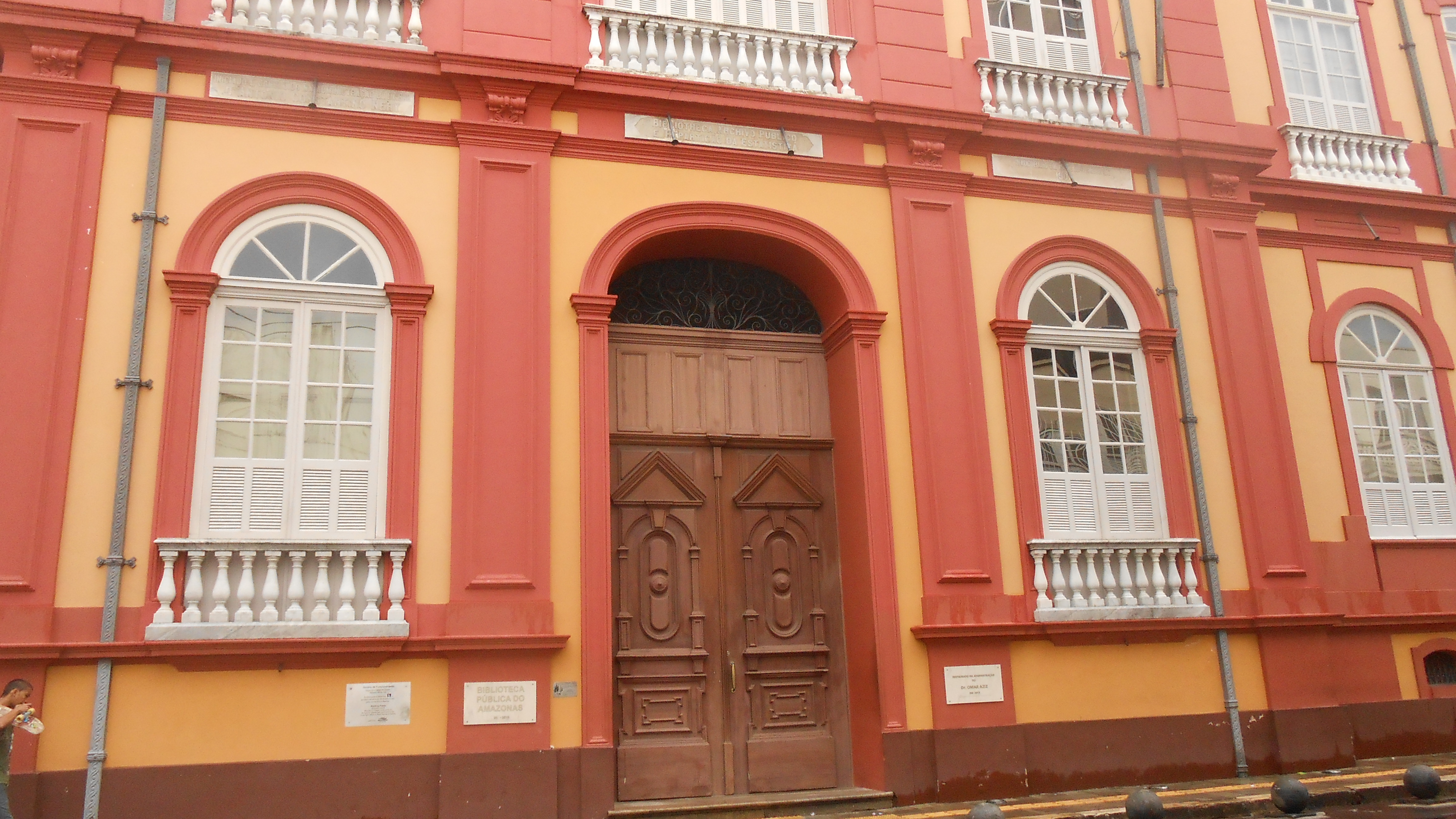
Library entrance.

Founded on March 19, 1871, the library was initially installed in a high school building and was just a reading room. It had only 1,200 volumes. In 1883, with 3,000 volumes, it moved to the Mother Church of Our Lady of the Conception and, in 1887, it was transferred to the Colégio Dom Pedro II, the state college.

In 1895, during the administration of Eduardo Gonçalves Ribeiro, a house was rented in the Guilherme Moreira Street to accommodate the library. Two years later, under Fileto Pires, it was abolished.

The library's current headquarters, located at 57 Barroso Street, began to be built during the government of Antônio Constantino Néri in the neoclassical style and was inaugurated on October 5, 1910. The stairs and columns came from Scotland, and the marble ceiling, crystal chandeliers and tiled skylight from England. In the beginning, the library was frequented by the cultural and social elite of the time, which included teachers, lawyers, doctors, magistrates, priests and merchants. At that time, its collection included valuable and rare encyclopedias.

Due to the economic stagnation in Amazonas as a result of the collapse in rubber prices, the library underwent a major setback and was unable to renew its collection or acquire new works. In the early hours of August 22, 1945, a fire completely destroyed the library's assets; only 60 books in an exhibition outside the building were saved.

Governor Álvaro Botelho Maia reopened the building with a collection of 45,000 volumes. Álvaro Maia himself donated 2,500 volumes to the library, and the rest came from voluntary donations. Since it opened, the library headquarters has undergone four renovations, both in terms of its structure and the preservation of its collection. It contains a large selection of old newspapers that are available for consultation. On April 12, 1988, the building was listed as a heritage site by the National Institute of Historic and Artistic Heritage (IPHAN) for its priceless historical and cultural value.

== See also ==
- List of libraries in Brazil
- Provincial Palace
