= Bolonha Mansion =

- Palacete Bolonha
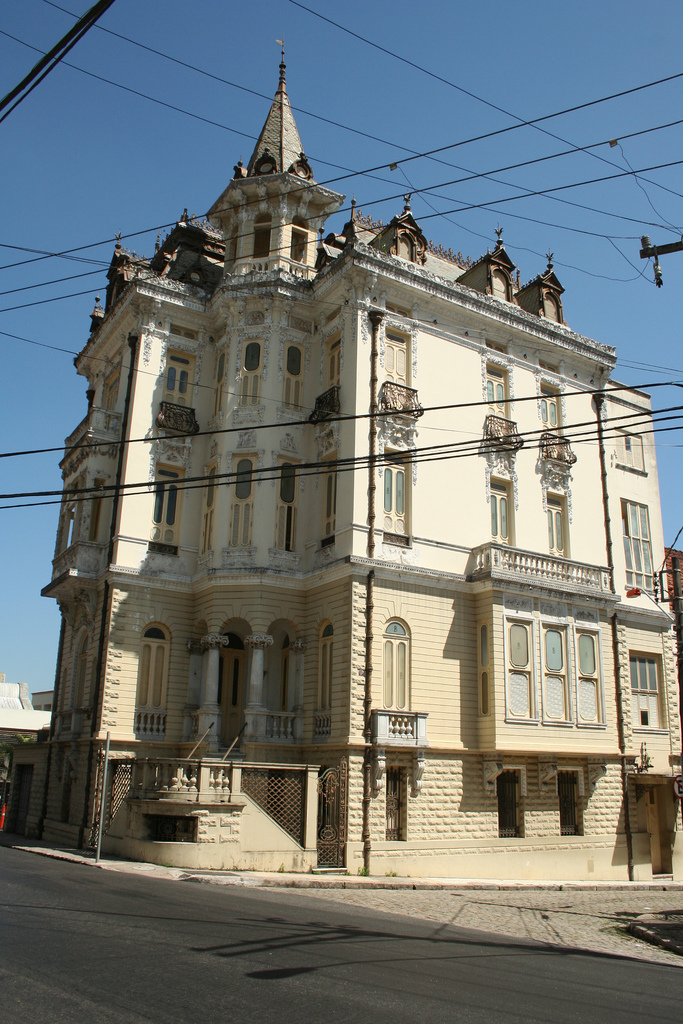
- Bolonha Mansion (Palacete Bolonha), Belém, Pará, Brazil

- Location within Brazil

General information
- Type: mansion
- Architectural style: Eclectic
- Location: Avenida Gov. José Malcher, 295, Nazaré, Belém, Pará, Belém, Pará, Brazil
- Coordinates: 1.451886°S 48.49081°W
- Construction started: 1905
- Inaugurated: 1908

Technical details
- Floor count: 3

Design and construction
- Architect: Francisco Bolonha

The Bolonha Mansion (Portuguese: Palacete Bolonha) is a historic residence in Belém, Pará, Brazil. It was built between 1905 and 1908 by the architect Francisco Bolonha (1872–1939) as a gift to his wife Alice Tem-Brink; he is also noted as the father of the modernist architect Francisco de Paula Lemos Bolonha. Bolonha was travelled extensively to Europe, and his works were greatly influence by Gustave Eiffel. The Bolonha Palace is a strong example of eclectic architecture in Brazil. It was listed as a historic structure by the Department of Historic, Artistic and Cultural Heritage of Pará in 1982.

== History ==
Numerous residential buildings appeared in the city of Belém during the "Rubber Cycle" in the Amazon. Wealthy merchants and politicians built properties, typically called "palaces" along with the name of the family: Bolonha, Faciola, Pinho, Montenegro, Virgilio Sampaio, and others. Many were demolished due to real estate speculation in the mid- and late-20th century. The mansions formed a nucleus of both political power and social life in Belém of the period. They were used as a "stage" for the elites of Pará, hosting dinners, balls, and recitals.

The Bolonha Mansion, while richly decorated, proved impractical. The house had little ventilation, and was vacated a few years after the death of Francisco Bolonha in 1939.

== Location ==
The Bolonha Mansion was built in a prestigious location on Rua de São Jerônimo (now Avenida Governador José Malcher) at the intersection of Rua Dr. Moraes. The mansion is east of the historic center of Pará, and a short distance from the Praça da República, a broad public square. Bolonha arranged his mansion and the houses of his family along the narrow, sloping Passagem Bolonha with "Neoclassical symmetry".

== Structure ==
The Bolonha Mansion consists of three floors with a belvedere. The residence was decorated with a profusion of themes and materials: Art Nouveau tiles, Greek and Roman-themed reliefs, reproductions of Pompeiian mosaics, and multichromatic glass and tiled flooring. The gilded stucco work was executed by Newton Sá.

== Protected status ==
The Montenegro Mansion was listed as a historic structure by the Department of Historic, Artistic and Cultural Heritage of the state of Pará in 1982.
