= Palace of Justice =

Palace of Justice may refer to:

== Structures ==
Alphabetical by country, then city

- Palace of Justice of the Argentine Nation, Buenos Aires, Argentina
- Palace of Justice (Rosario), Argentina
- Palace of Justice, Vienna, Austria
- Palace of Justice, Antwerp, Belgium
- Palace of Justice, Brussels, Belgium
- Palace of Justice, Manaus, Brazil
- Palace of Justice of São Paulo, Brazil
- Former palace of Justice of Douala, Cameroon
- Palais de justice (Montreal), Canada
- Palace of Justice of Colombia, Bogotá, Colombia
- Palace of Justice of Aix-en-Provence, France
- Palais de Justice tram stop, Bordeaux, France
- Palais de Justice, Paris, France
- Rouen Courthouse, or Palais de justice de Rouen, France
- Palais de Justice, Strasbourg, France
- Justizpalast (Munich), Germany
- Palace of Justice, Nuremberg, Germany
- Palace of Justice, Rome, Italy
- Palace of Justice, Amman, Jordan
- Palace of Justice (Pristina), Kosovo
- Palace of Justice, Riga, Latvia
- Palace of Justice (Beirut), Lebanon
- Palace of Justice and the Parliament, home of the Kaunas State Philharmonic, Lithuania
- Palais de la Cour de Justice, seat of the Court of Justice of the European Union, Luxembourg
- Palace of Justice, Putrajaya, Malaysia
- Castellania (Valletta), known as the Palais de Justice 1798–1800, Malta
- Palace of Justice, Lima, Peru
- Palácio da Justiça (Coimbra), Portugal
- Palácio da Justiça (Porto), Portugal
- Palace of Justice, Bucharest, Romania
- Palace of Justice, Cluj-Napoca, Romania
- Zrenjanin Court House, or Palace of Justice, Serbia
- Palace of Justice, Pretoria, South Africa
- Istanbul Justice Palace, Turkey
- Palacio de Justicia de Caracas, Venezuela

== Events ==
- Palace of Justice siege, a 1985 siege of the Colombian Palace of Justice
