= Palace of Justice, Manaus =

Building in Manaus, Brazil

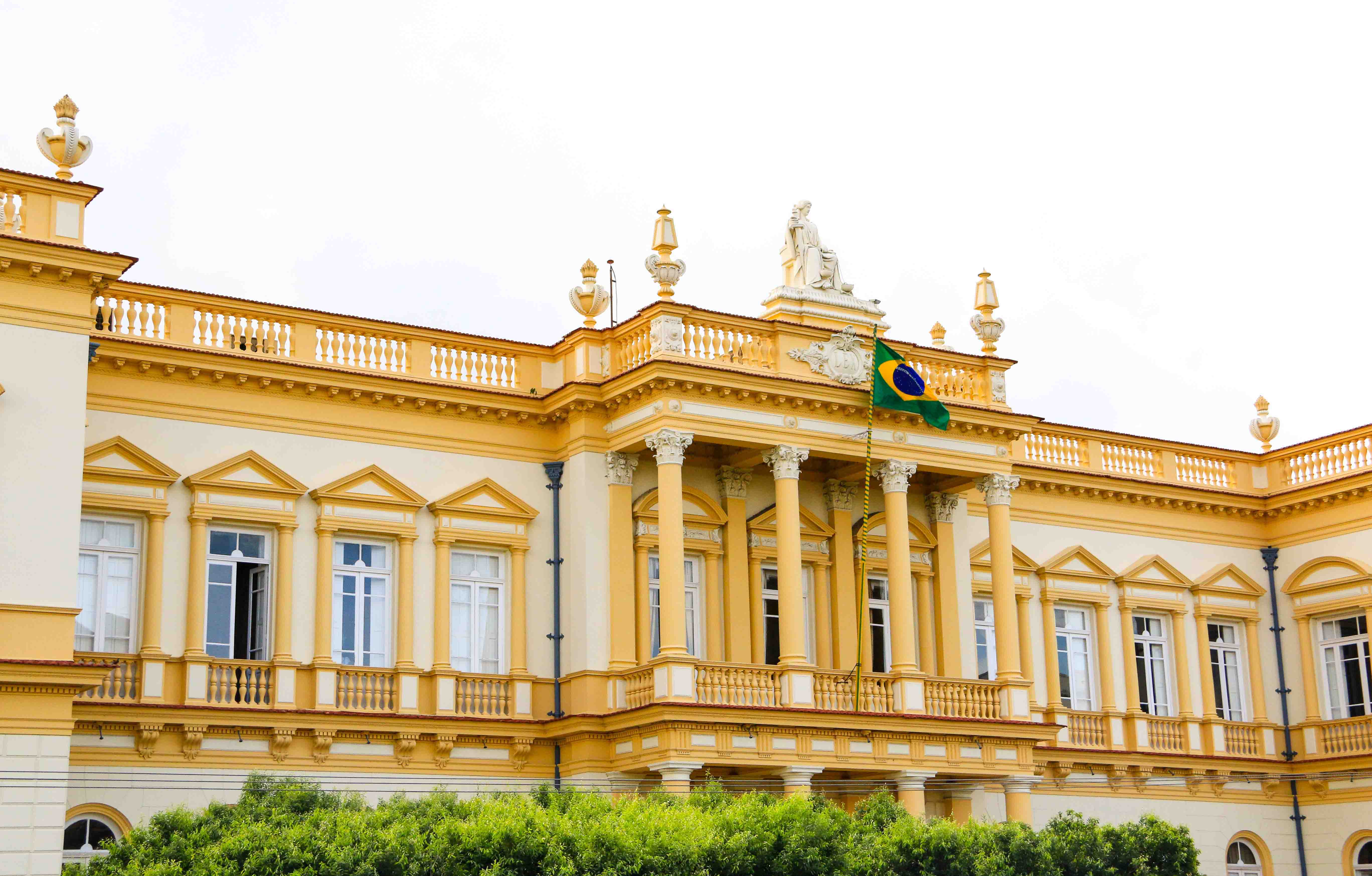
- Main façade of the Palace of Justice
- Interactive map of the Palace of Justice, Manaus area
- Alternative names: Centro Cultural Palácio da Justiça

General information
- Type: Palace, government
- Architectural style: Classical
- Location: Manaus, Brazil
- Coordinates: 3°07′49″S 60°01′28″W
- Construction started: 1894
- Construction stopped: 1900
- Inaugurated: 21 April 1900
- Renovated: 2001

Height
- Height: 12 m (39 ft)

Technical details
- Floor count: 2
- Floor area: 2,515 m^{2} (27,070 ft^{2})

Design and construction
- Awards and prizes: Historical and Artistic Heritage of Amazonas

Website
- cultura.am.gov.br

The Palace of Justice is a historic building located on Avenida Eduardo Ribeiro, in the city center of Manaus, in Brazil. It is located behind the Amazon Theater and has more than two thousand square meters of built area in stone and brick masonry. It was erected in the 19th century specifically to house the facilities of the Judiciary of the State of Amazonas at the time.

Inaugurated in 1900, it is one of the main examples of classical architecture from the golden age of rubber. It was listed as a Historical and Artistic Heritage of Amazonas in 1980, and the names given to the rooms that make it up pay homage to personalities linked to its establishment and to the Judiciary of the state.

The building is currently managed by the State Department of Culture (SEC) and functions as the Palácio da Justiça Cultural Center (CCPJ). The space is open to the public and also promotes art through exhibitions, musical performances, theater, cinema, and lectures. The Palace of Justice receives around 20,000 visitors a year.

== History ==
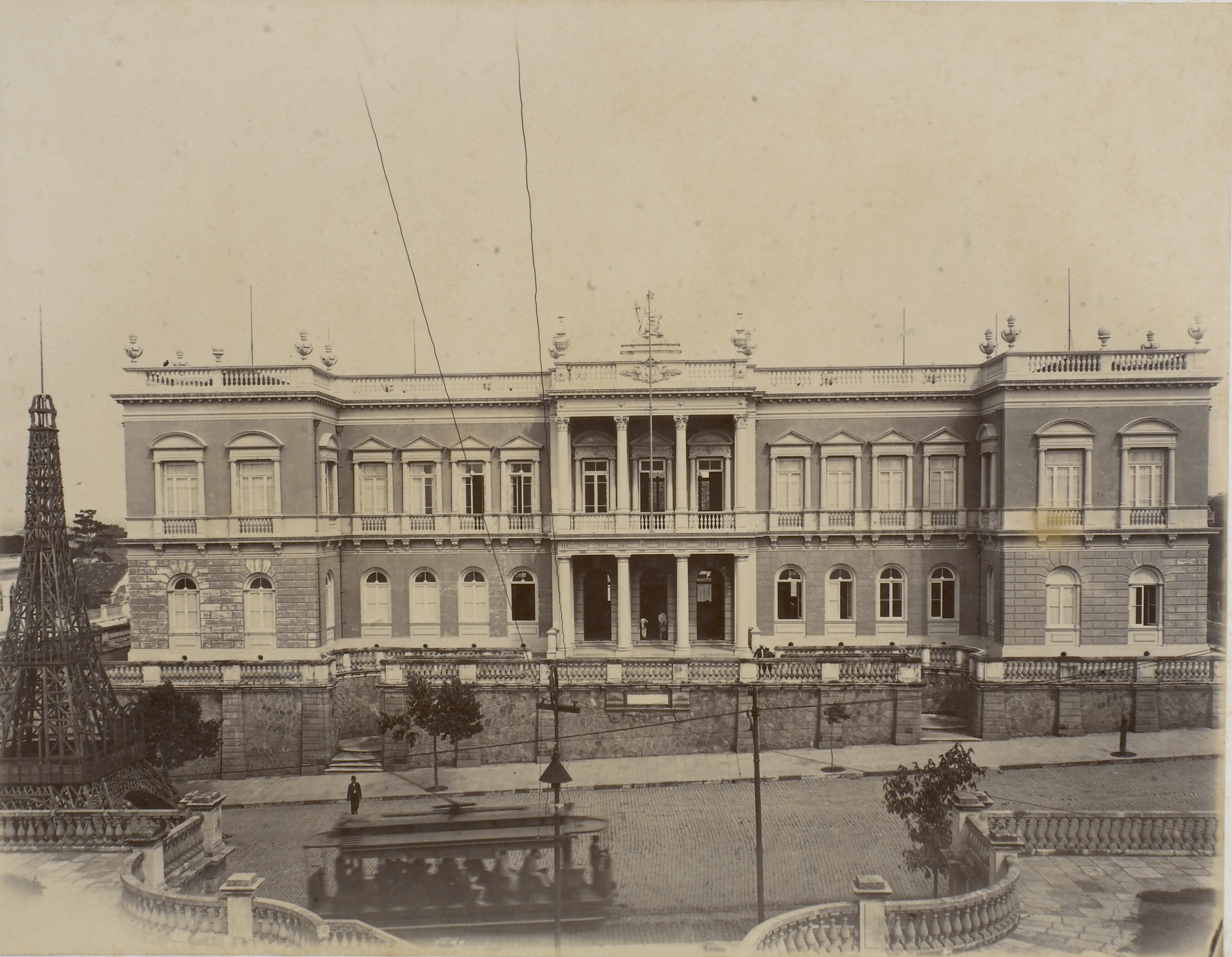
Palace of Justice, in 1906. National Archives.

On April 18, 1894, Governor Eduardo Ribeiro signed a contract with the firm Moers & Moreton, for 654 contos and 259,933 réis, for the construction of the Palace of Justice, a two-story building with an imposing façade of classical architectural lines, with more than five thousand square meters of built area in stone and brick masonry, specifically intended for the facilities of the Judiciary of the State of Amazonas.

Construction of the Palace of Justice began immediately. The structure of the building, the masonry work on the two floors, and the framing of the roof were practically finished when Eduardo Ribeiro handed over the government to his successor Fileto Pires Ferreira on July 23, 1896. From then on, the work was slowed down and less than eight months later, on March 15, 1897, the construction contract was amicably terminated at the proposal of the contractors Moers & Moreton.

Construction came to a standstill and, in order to cut costs, governor Fileto Pires ordered changes to the building's design and only contracted emergency works and services by direct administration, which were necessary to guarantee the preservation of the valuable heritage, which was exposed to the sun and rain and was beginning to show signs of deterioration. The roof was then redone, replacing the entire wooden structure, which, as well as being rotten, was not properly inclined to receive the marseilles tiles chosen for the roof. The cracks in the walls were corrected, and the building's structures (whose stability was under threat) were consolidated by "reinforcing its foundations at all the protruding angles with stone and cement masonry blocks", braced "with iron ties".

The palace was inaugurated on April 21, 1900, during the government of Colonel José Cardoso Ramalho Júnior. It is one of the main examples of classical architecture from the golden age of the rubber cycle and its structural lines follow the Renaissance style.

== Architectural features ==
The Palace is located at a privileged point on Avenida Eduardo Ribeiro, right behind the Amazon Theater. It has cast iron gates imported from Glasgow, Scotland, and paving and staircases made of Lios stone from Lisbon. The ceiling of the hall is covered in stucco and the walls in imitation marble. The imposing main staircase has a metal railing with gilded arches with six caryatids, imported from Lisbon. The floor of the hall is made of hydraulic tiles. The second floor is decorated with balustrades, glasses, stuccoed ceilings, columns, marbled panels and walls, wooden floors (acapu and pau-amarelo).

The furniture is centuries old. A highlight is the carillon clock from the 1920s, with a structure made of Bahia rosewood and Swiss machinery. There is also a mahogany table, a set of tables, chairs and a mirror that came from the last restoration in 2002, as well as modern furniture from the Judiciary until 2006 and an original chandelier made of bronze and crystals.

== Historical Heritage ==
The Palace of Justice was listed as a Historical and Artistic Heritage Site of the State of Amazonas by Decree No. 5218, of October 3, 1980, signed by Governor José Lindoso.

Over the years, it has undergone various conservation and restoration works, especially the one carried out between 2001 and 2002, and was inaugurated as the Palácio da Justiça Cultural Center in June 2006, thus deserving specific care and special attention from those who use it. Built on an elevated area of the city, it is protected by a sturdy wall with balustrades.

== Gallery ==
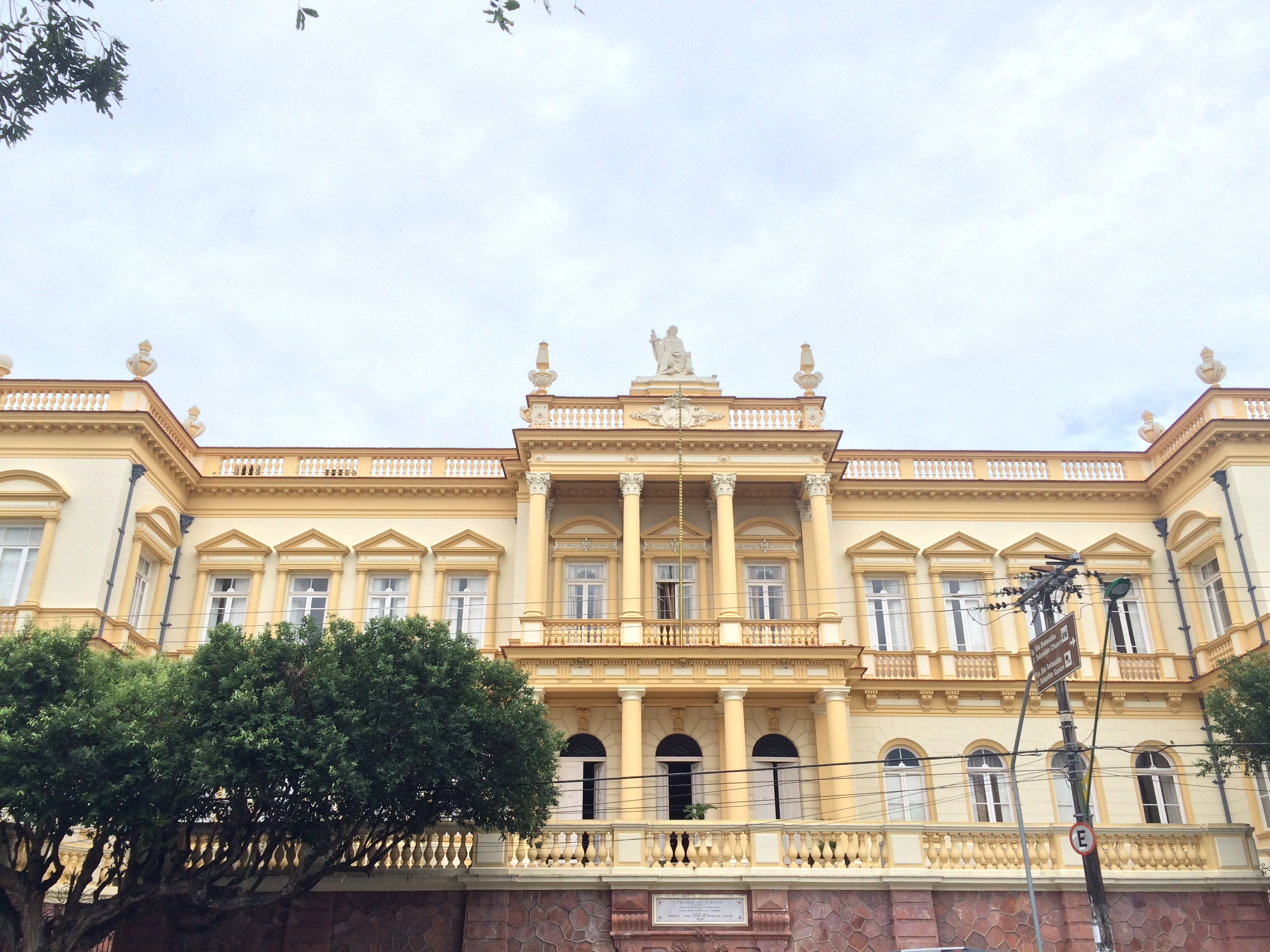
Main façade of the Palace of Justice.

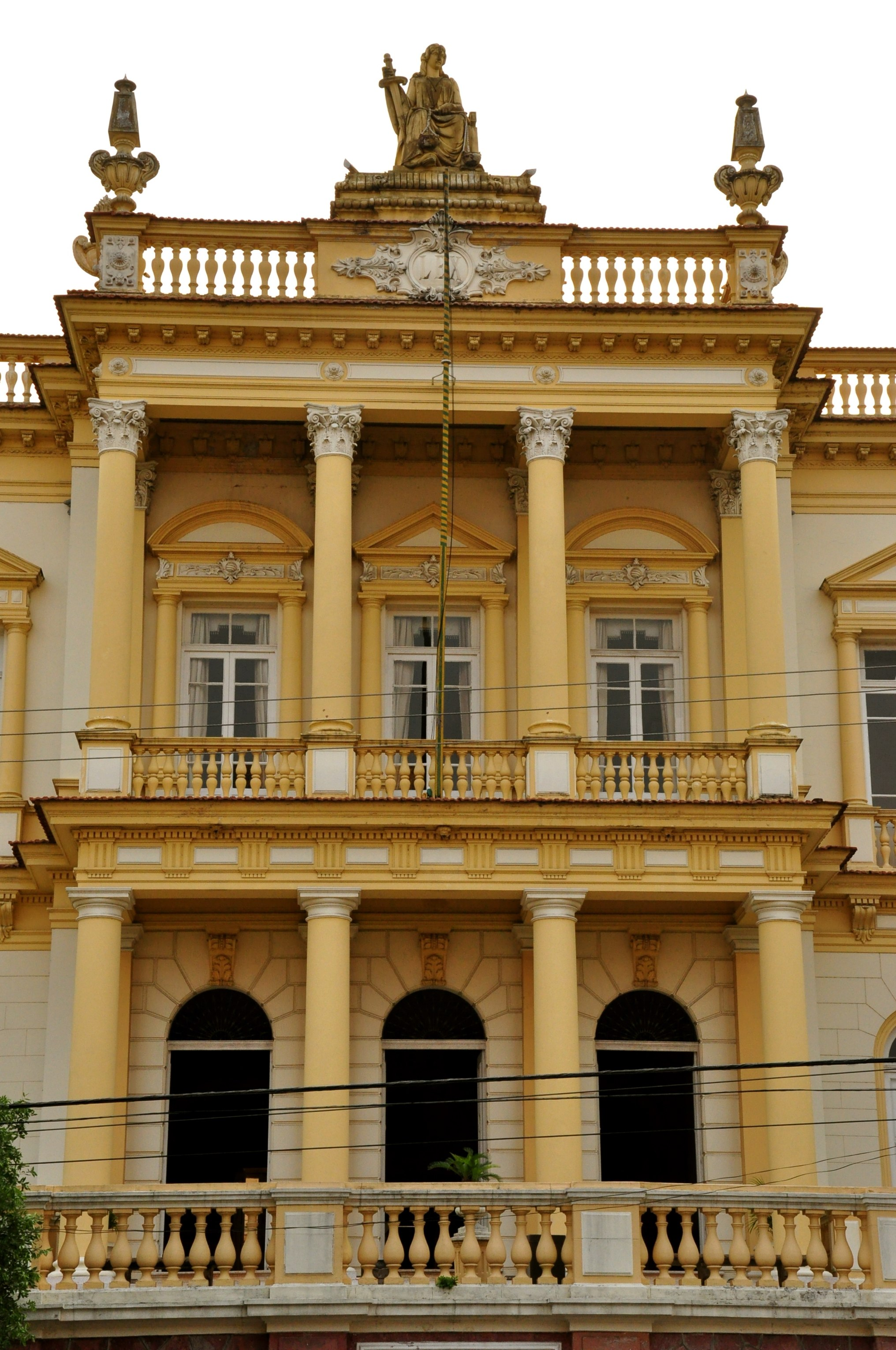
Details of the main façade.

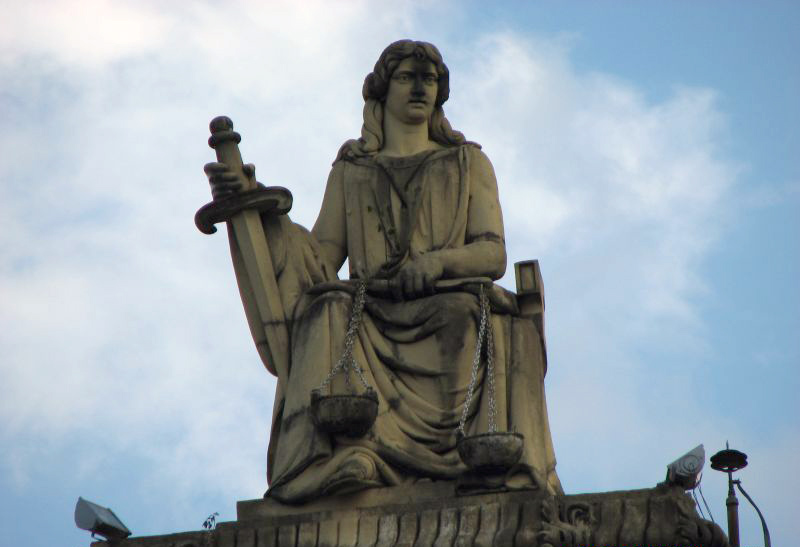
Sculpture of Justice with her scales and sword on the top of the building.

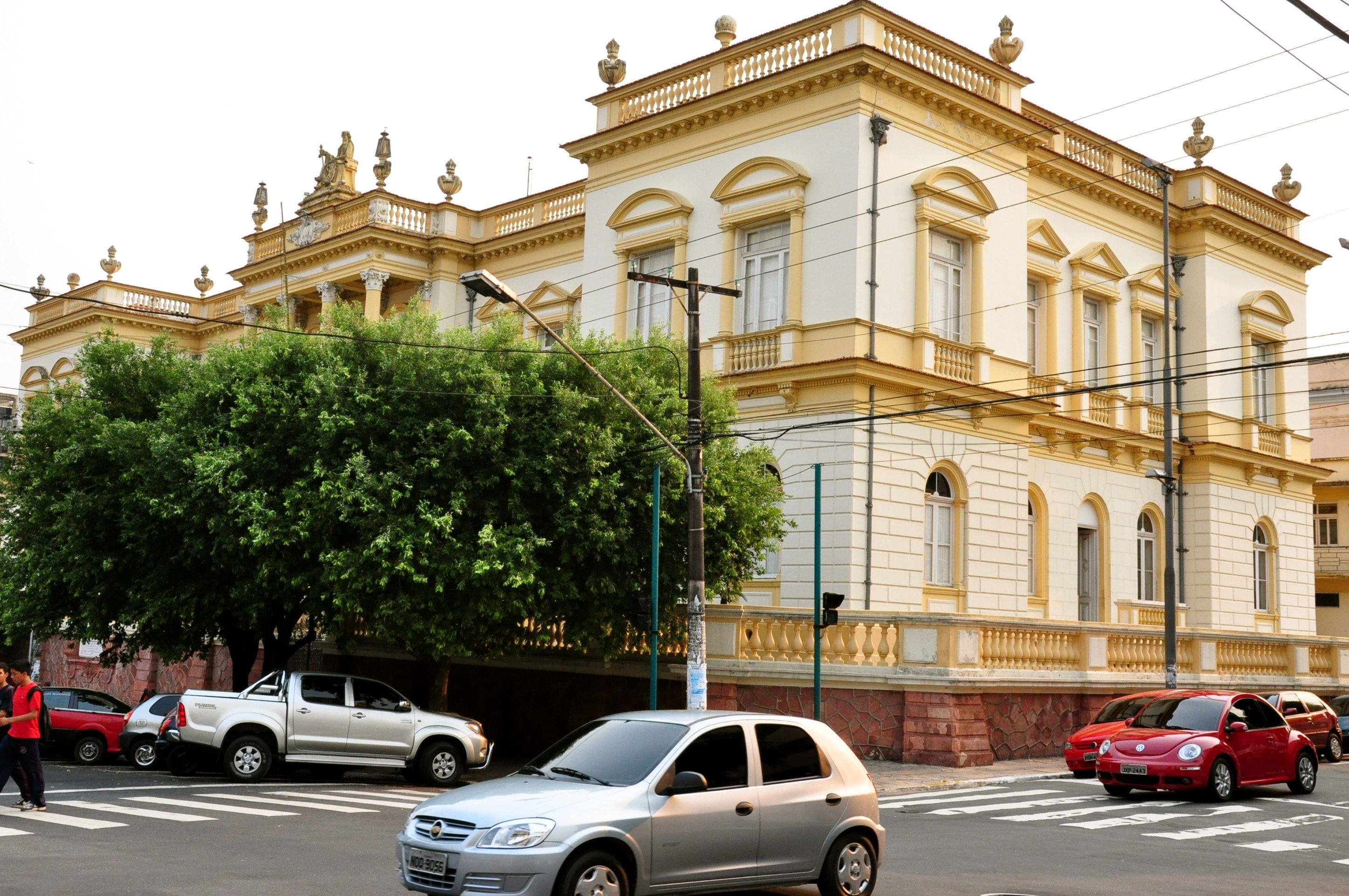
Main and side façades.

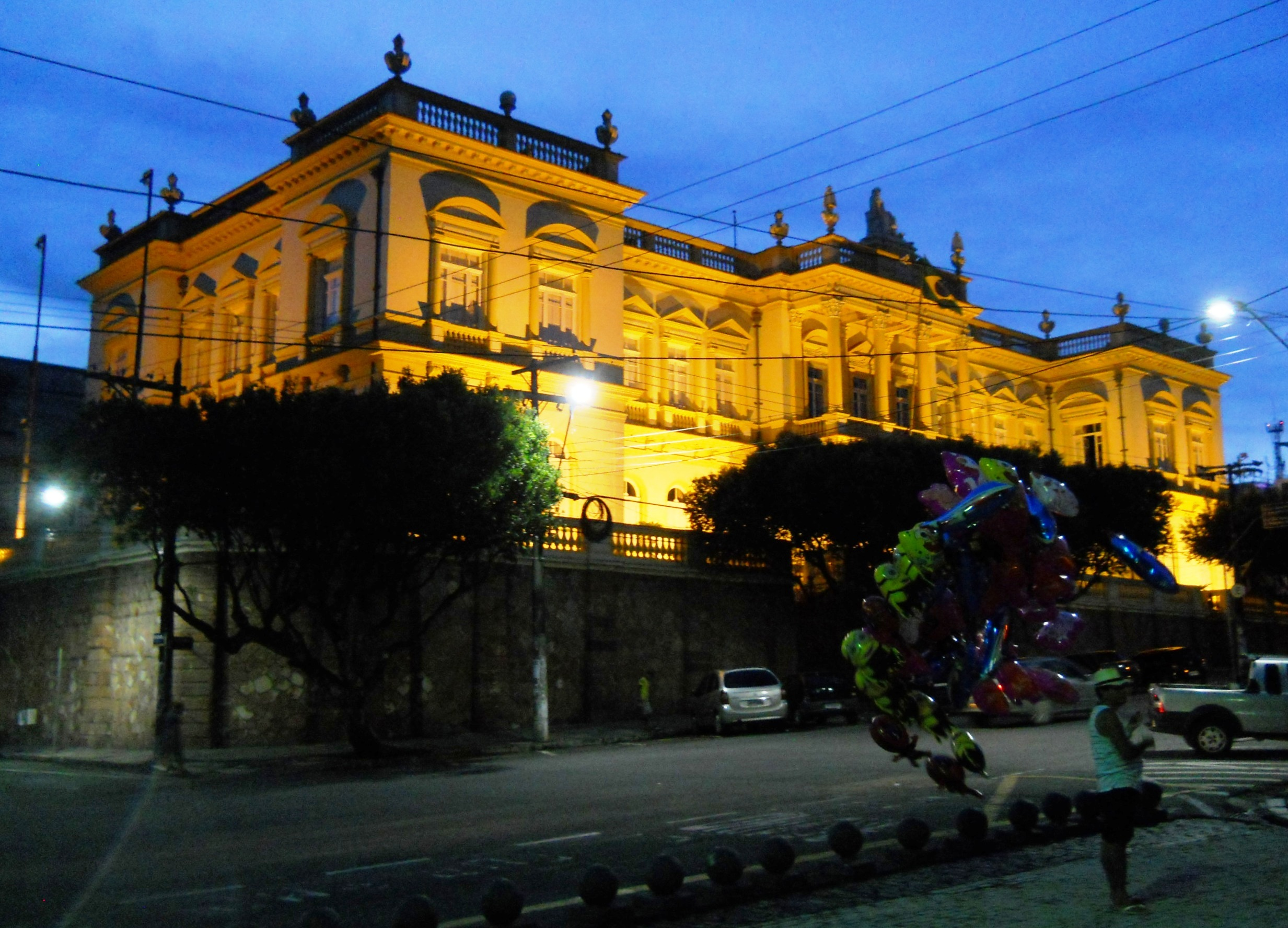
Main façade at night.

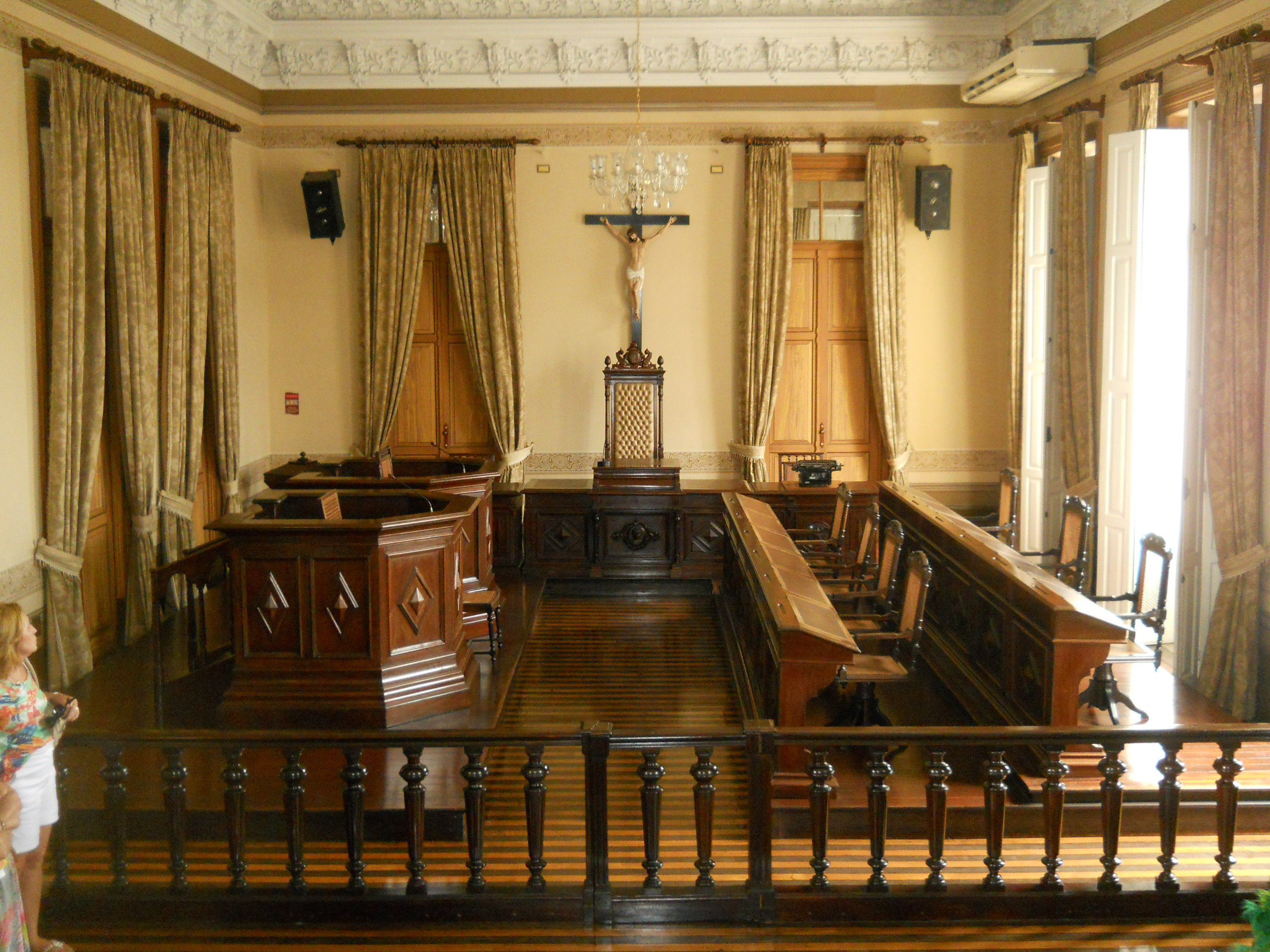
Jury room with fully preserved furniture.

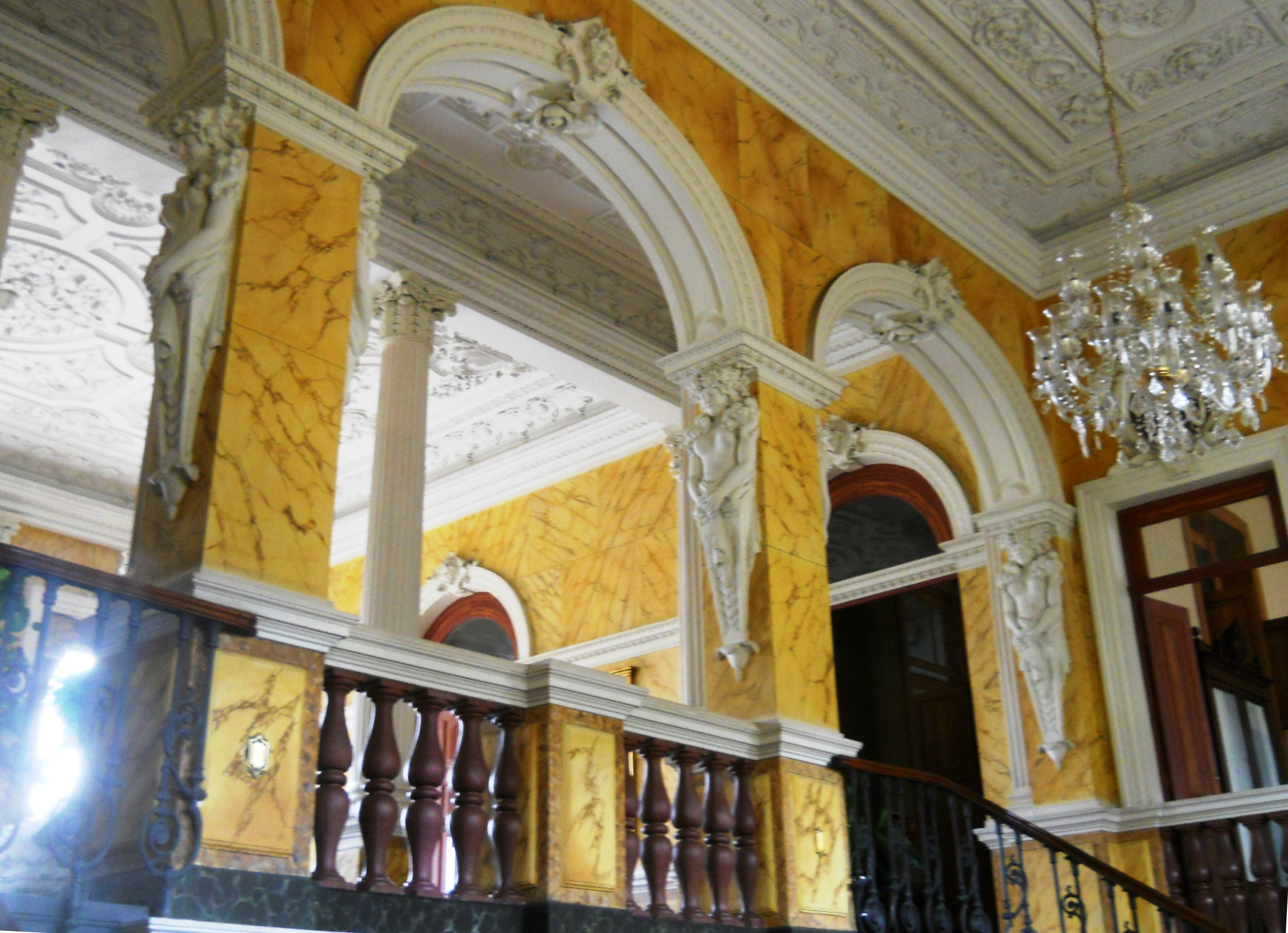
Internal architecture.

== See also ==
- Palace of Justice of São Paulo
- Church of Saint Sebastian
- Monument Abertura dos Portos
- Metropolitan Cathedral of Our Lady of the Conception
