= Monument Abertura dos Portos =

- Monumento à Abertura dos Portos
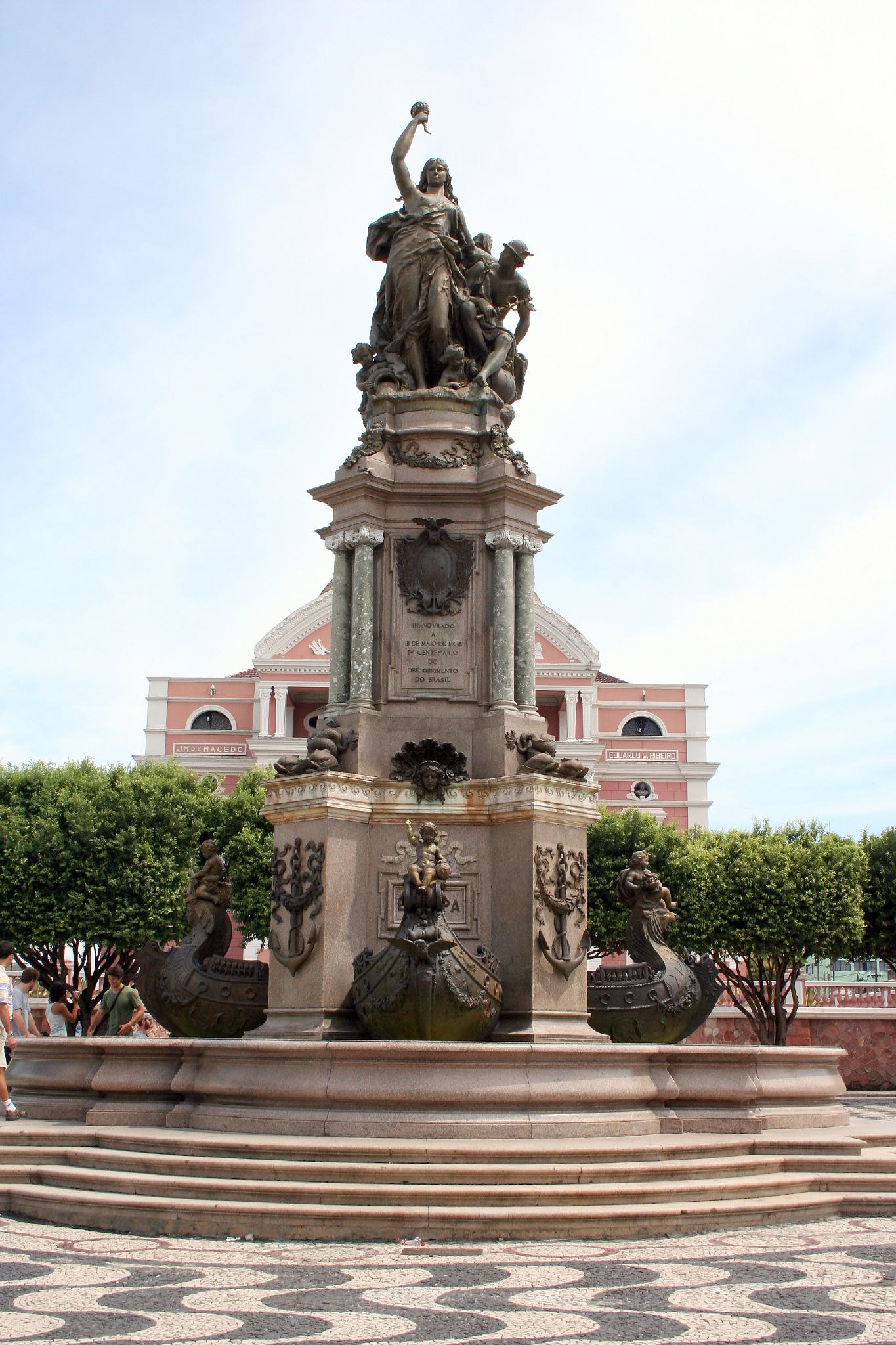
- Monument Abertura dos Portos in front of the Amazon Theatre
- Alternative names: Monumento à Abertura dos Portos às Nações Amigas

General information
- Architectural style: Neoclassical
- Town or city: Manaus
- Country: Brazil
- Coordinates: 3°7′49.2″S 60°1′21.1″W
- Inaugurated: 1900; 125 years ago
- Renovated: 1995

Monument Abertura dos Portos (English: Monument to the Opening of the Ports) is located in the Largo de São Sebastião, in front of the Amazon Theatre, in the city of Manaus, Brazil. It was inaugurated in 1900 to commemorate the liberation of the ports of the Amazon River to foreign trade, in 1866.

== History ==
The monument was inaugurated in the first decade of the 1900s to commemorate the opening of the Amazon River ports for foreign trade in 1866.

All material used on the monument was imported from Europe, especially Italy. The monument symbolizes the four corners of the world: Asia, America, Africa and Europe, each represented by a ship, with a seated boy on the prow of each ship.

The monument displays the date of November 15, 1889, which commemorates the proclamation of the Republic of Brazil, and the name of José Cardoso Ramalho Júnior, at that time Governor of Amazonas State. In 1995, the square was fully restored by the prefecture of Manaus.

== Features ==
The monument is an allegory of trade, and was built in marble, granite and bronze. The god Mercury, symbol of Industry and Commerce, is at the top of the monument. The main figure is composed by the sculpture of a woman - representing the Amazon - with a torch in the right hand, while the left hand rests on the shoulder of the god Mercury - Roman deity that symbolizes Commerce - placed on the lower plane. In the faces of the quadrangular pedestal, four continents of the terrestrial globe are portrayed.

In the Africa's boat, sitting on a head that symbolizes the Egypt, with symbols also Egyptian, a boy holds two tusks of elephant; the boat of Europe, which displays an eagle to the bow, shows a boy holding a globe; the Asian boat shows the "croissant", symbol of the Muslims, ancient characters engraved at the bow and the boy to the backs of a lion; in the ship of America are grouped several decorative elements, with a boy to the bow and a snake curled up in the keel of the boat.

The floor that has sinuous designs that later would have inspired the sidewalks of Copacabana, in the city of Rio de Janeiro, symbolize the meeting of the waters of the rivers Negro and Solimões.

== See also ==
- Amazon Theatre
- Mercado Adolpho Lisboa
- Amazon River
- Amazon rubber boom
- Church of Saint Sebastian
- Palace of Justice
