= Palace of Justice of São Paulo =

- Palácio da Justiça de São Paulo
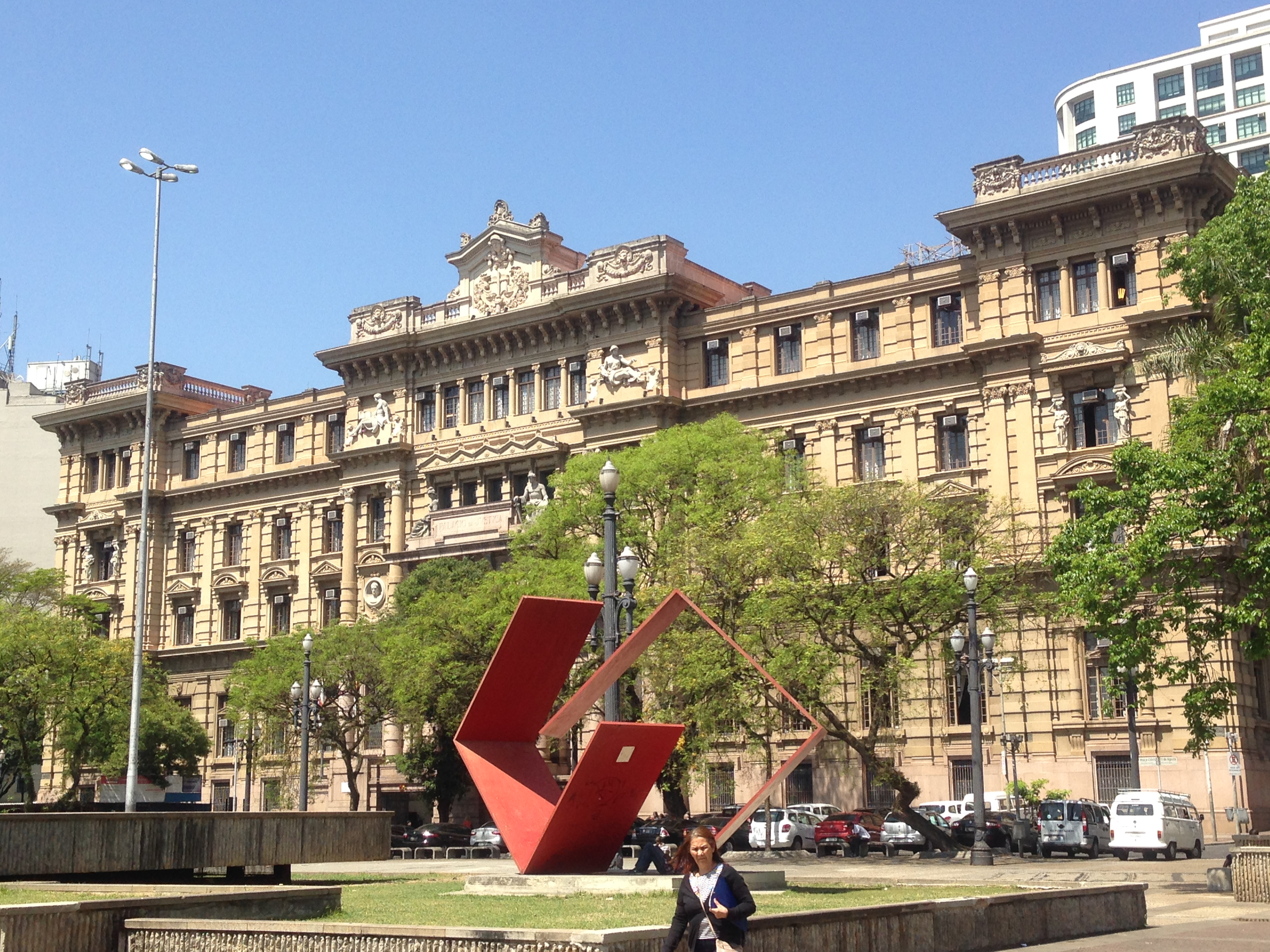
- Facade of the São Paulo Palace of Justice
- Interactive map of the Palace of Justice of São Paulo area
- Former names: Tribunal da Relação de São Paulo e Paraná

General information
- Type: Court, palace, museum
- Architectural style: Eclectic
- Classification: Listed by CONDEPHAAT in 1981
- Location: São Paulo, Brazil
- Coordinates: 23°33′7″S 46°37′59″W
- Construction started: 24 August 1920; 105 years ago
- Inaugurated: 2 August 1933; 92 years ago

Technical details
- Floor count: 5

Design and construction
- Architect: Ramos de Azevedo

Website
- www.tjsp.jus.br/Museu/PalacioDaJustica

The Palace of Justice is the seat of the Court of Justice of the state of São Paulo. It is located in the old center of the city of São Paulo, between the squares Praça da Sé, Praça João Mendes Jr., and Praça Clóvis Bevilácqua, near the São Paulo Cathedral, the Anchieta Palace (seat of the Municipal Chamber of São Paulo) and the Matarazzo Building (seat of the São Paulo City Hall). Nearby one finds the headquarters of the Order of Attorneys of Brazil and the Public Prosecution Office of the State of São Paulo, as well as the Law School of the University of São Paulo. Its construction happened due to the expansion of the São Paulo judicial sphere and demographic growth, which meant the Court of Justice needed to be housed in a new headquarter, and no longer in old mansions in the central region of São Paulo.

== Overview ==
With the proclamation of the Republic in Brazil in 1889, the federative structure of the country followed, assigning, in 1891, the judicial competence to the former Provinces of the Empire, now states. With the growing demand resulting from the economic growth of São Paulo in the first decades of the 20th century, it was necessary to build a headquarters for the São Paulo judiciary. In 1911, the office of the famous architect Ramos de Azevedo was hired, who, inspired by the Palace of Justice of Rome, carried out a project that was accepted by the Court.

The building was erected in neoclassical style with a baroque touch, and therefore had luxurious and ornate finishes. The construction began on the site that housed the old cavalry barracks, in the year of 1920, and had its conclusion and inauguration in the year of 1933, thirteen years later, and reinaugurating in 1942, in honor of the anniversary of 388 years of the city of São Paulo. It was listed by CONDEPHAAT in 1981 for being considered a historical landmark with architectural and cultural value to São Paulo.

The construction works suffered setbacks, the greatest of which occurred during the 1924 São Paulo Revolt, aggravated by the death of the architect Ramos de Azevedo in 1928, which forced the Court to negotiate a new contract in 1929 with successors from his office - Ricardo Severo and Arnaldo Dumont Vilares - through the State Public Works Directorate, under the supervision of Dr. H. Forense, also extended on April 26, 1931. The palace currently houses the courtrooms of the appellate level of the São Paulo Court, as well as the entire administrative structure of the São Paulo judiciary.

== History ==
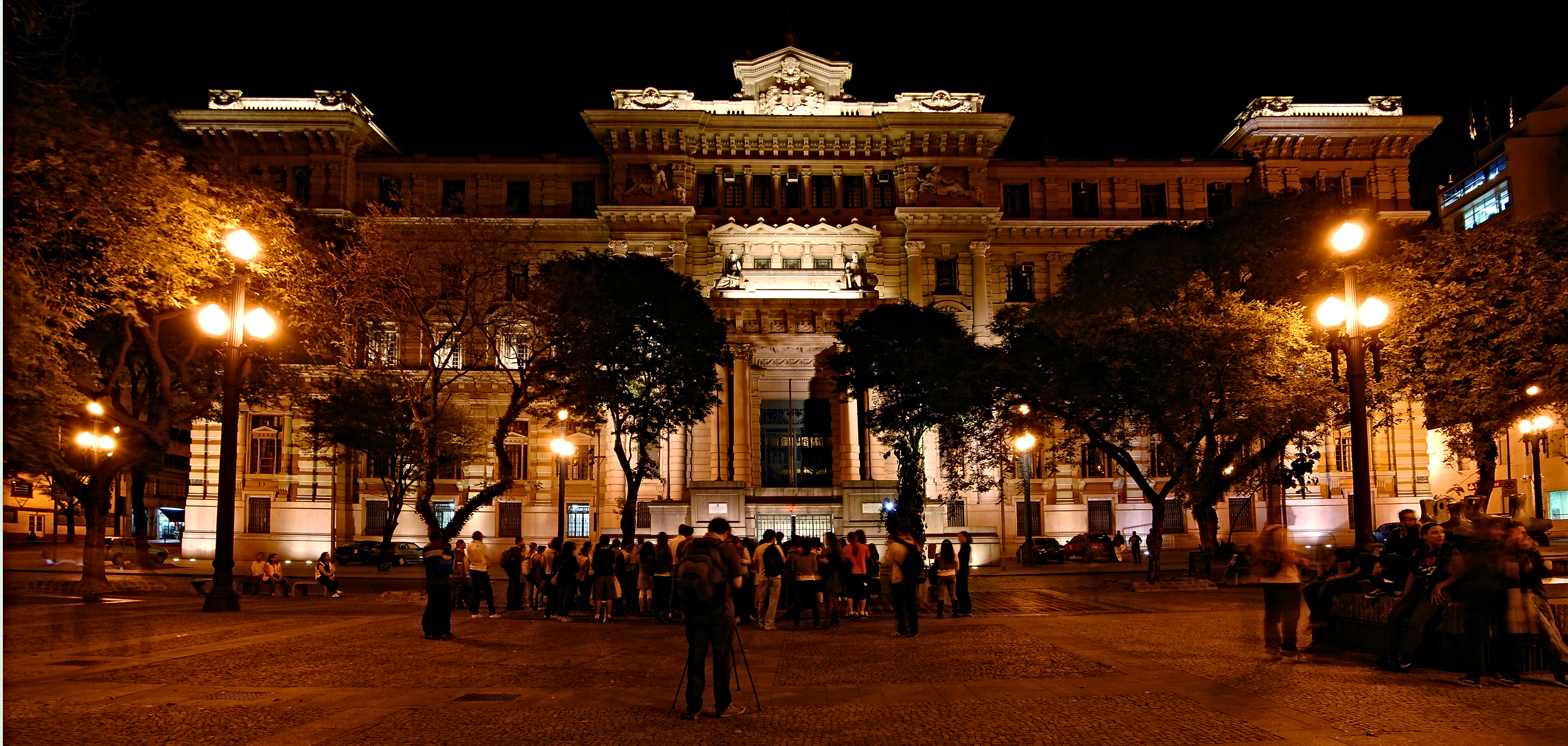
Main façade of the Palace at night.

The first seat of the Court of Justice was called the Court of Appeal of the Province of São Paulo (Tribunal da Relação da Província de São Paulo in Portuguese) and was created on August 6, 1873, by decree number 2,542. At that time, the Court was located at Rua da Boa Vista, near Rua 3 de Dezembro and Rua 25 de Março. The number of employees was still small then: there were only seven judges. Due to the high demographic growth in the region and the expansion of the judiciary in the state of São Paulo, there was a need to build a headquarters to house the Court.

At the time, the Court was presided over by Counselor Tristão de Alencar Araripe. He held the position of president until May 2, 1874, when Judge José Norberto dos Santos took over. Justiniano Batptista Madureira was the last person to be appointed judge of the Court during the period of the monarchy, before the proclamation of the Republic on November 15, 1889. With the promulgation of the Brazilian Constitution of 1891, the Court of Justice of the State of São Paulo came into being through Decree number 2 of December 1. That same year, more specifically on November 18, the judiciary was organized through law number 18. This law established that the President of the State of São Paulo was responsible for the Court of Justice.

== Construction ==
The Palace of Justice had its cornerstone laid on August 24, 1920, in front of Rua Onze de Agosto. Although the stone was only laid on that date, the idea of realizing the project was already incubated in June 1911 by the then-Secretary of Justice and Public Security Washington Luís, who years later became the thirteenth president of Brazil. After 13 years of construction, the facility was finally completed and inaugurated on January 2, 1933.

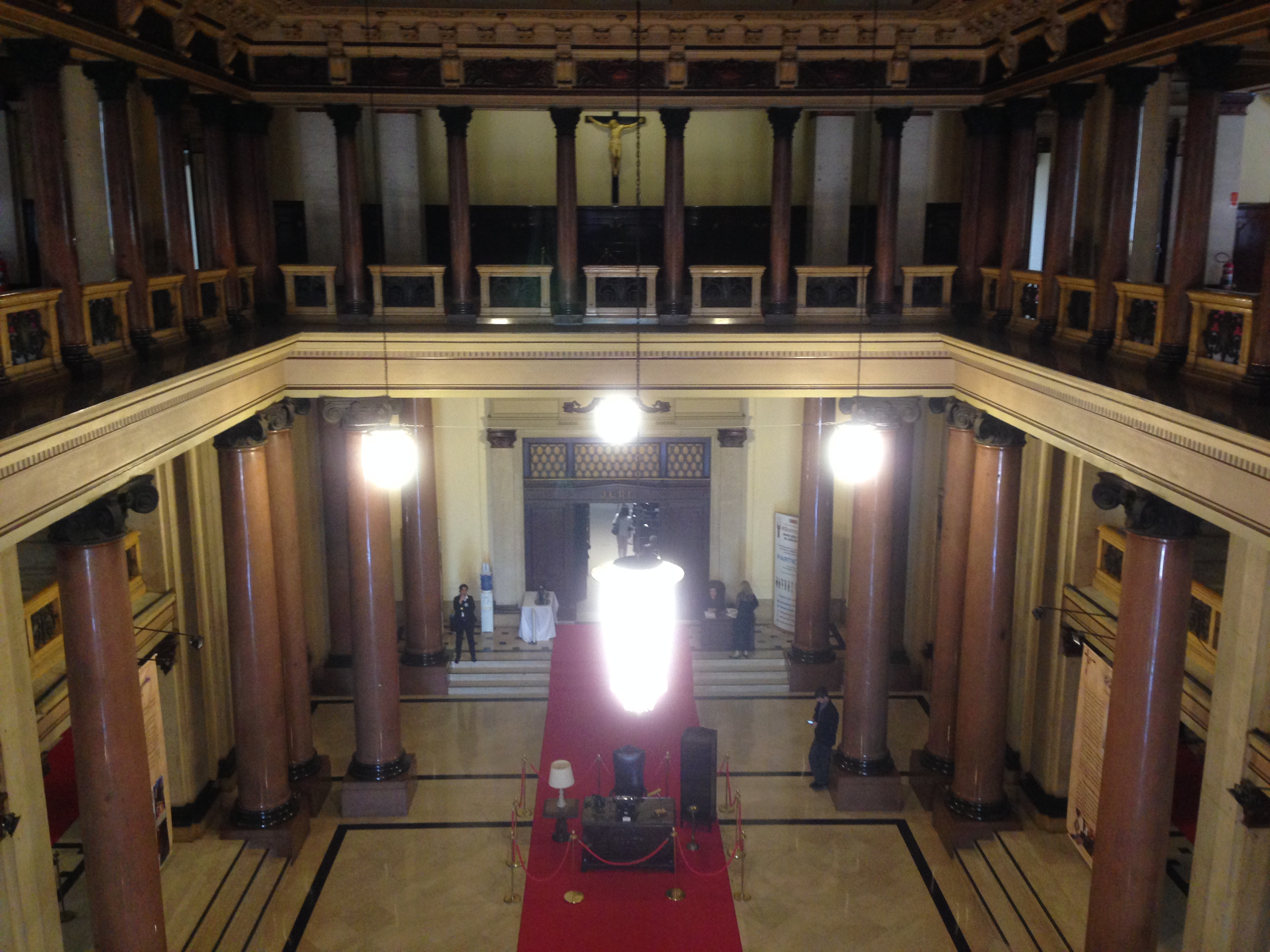
Interior of the Palace of Justice in São Paulo

The architect Ramos de Azevedo was responsible for the design of the building and supervised the work until his death in 1928. After the fatality, Ricardo Severo and Arnaldo Villares took over the works. The workers who participated in the project were mostly immigrants from Italy and Spain.

During the construction works, Ramos had the support of Domiziano Rossi, who designed the Palace based on the Palazzo di Giustizia, located in the city of Rome, Italy. Due to the delay in concluding the project, the population became skeptical and pessimistic about the completion of the building, so much so that the construction ended up being nicknamed "unfinished symphony". The delay in construction was justified by the scarce funds that were granted annually by the government. The building was completed in 1933, after receiving more funds.

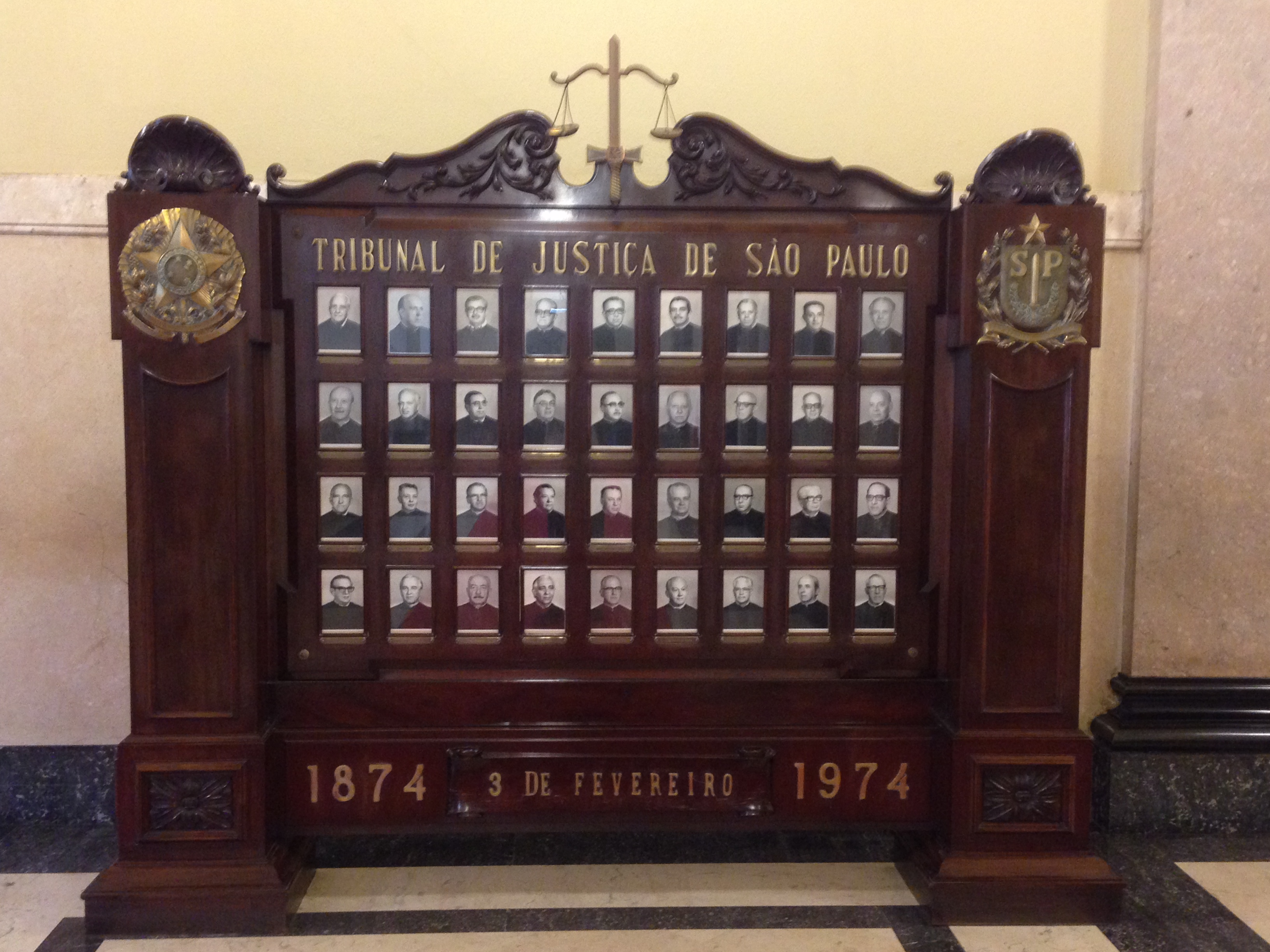
Images of former members of the São Paulo Court of Justice exhibited at the Palace of Justice

The building was one of the first in Brazil to use metal structures. It has luxurious finishes and ornaments such as caryatids and symbols of the judiciary. The interior space features panels, stained glass windows, murals and paintings. The architectural style - both of the interior and the façades - is eclectic, combining baroque and neoclassical elements.

The inauguration ceremony of the Palace of Justice took place on January 2, 1933. The session was attended by Minister Urbano Marcondes de Moura, who was responsible for delivering the speech, making his remarks about the Palace, often in a lyrical tone.

The building was listed in 1981 by the State Government.

=== Overcrowding issues ===
After a while, shortly after its inauguration and the admiration for its spacious and luxurious structure, the Palace of Justice began to face a period of difficulties, mainly due to the great growth of the city of São Paulo. The result was overcrowding at the Court's headquarters. The situation was becoming more and more worrying, to the point that in 1946, the then-president of the court Mário Guimarães made a statement to announce what the Palace space was going through.

At the time, the Palace was so crowded that its bathrooms had to be used as offices for work. In order to rid the building of this urgent overcrowding, steps were taken, such as the project to erect another building next to it, which would function as an extension of the Palace and bear the name of Master João Mendes. However, this would take too much time and urgent action was needed. Therefore, Dr. Ulpiano da Costa Manso, secretary of the Court, proposed that the trial court be transferred to another rented building near the Palace. The proposal was authorized and the building was rented. Still, the relocated lawyers and judges were installed in precarious conditions, causing irritability and dissatisfaction.

The inauguration of the new building was accompanied by a novelty: from that moment on, the judiciary became decentralized, since courts were created that were located in the districts of the city.

== Internal structure ==
Upon entering the Palace of Justice, visitors can see the marble and granite coverings that line its floors. Inside the building, more precisely on the fifth floor, one finds the Portrait Room, where images of all those who have been presidents of the Court of Justice are exhibited. This is where the ordinary sessions of the trial chambers are currently held. In the past, it was used for selection processes for entry to the judiciary and examinations for the Public Prosecutor's Office.

The central hall of the Palace is known as the Hall of Lost Steps ("Salão dos Passos Perdidos" in Portuguese) and is where visitors can access the rest of the building. This hall used to be the waiting area for visitors attending trials. The Salão Nobre ("Noble Saloon") or Ministro Manoel da Costa Manso Room, is a space used for elections, meetings of the Council of the Magistrate, inaugurations of judges, among other activities. The room is named after Manoel da Costa, who was president of the São Paulo Court of Justice between 1931 and 1933.

Lastly, there is the Jury Court, which is the place where some events held by the Magistrate currently take place, in addition to competitions and lectures. It has a decorative aspect with Renaissance characteristics, especially on the ceiling. In this space, important trial processes took place, such as that of the former military policeman Florisvaldo de Oliveira, and the singer and musician Lindomar Castilho, who was sentenced to seven years in prison for murdering his second wife.

== Gallery ==
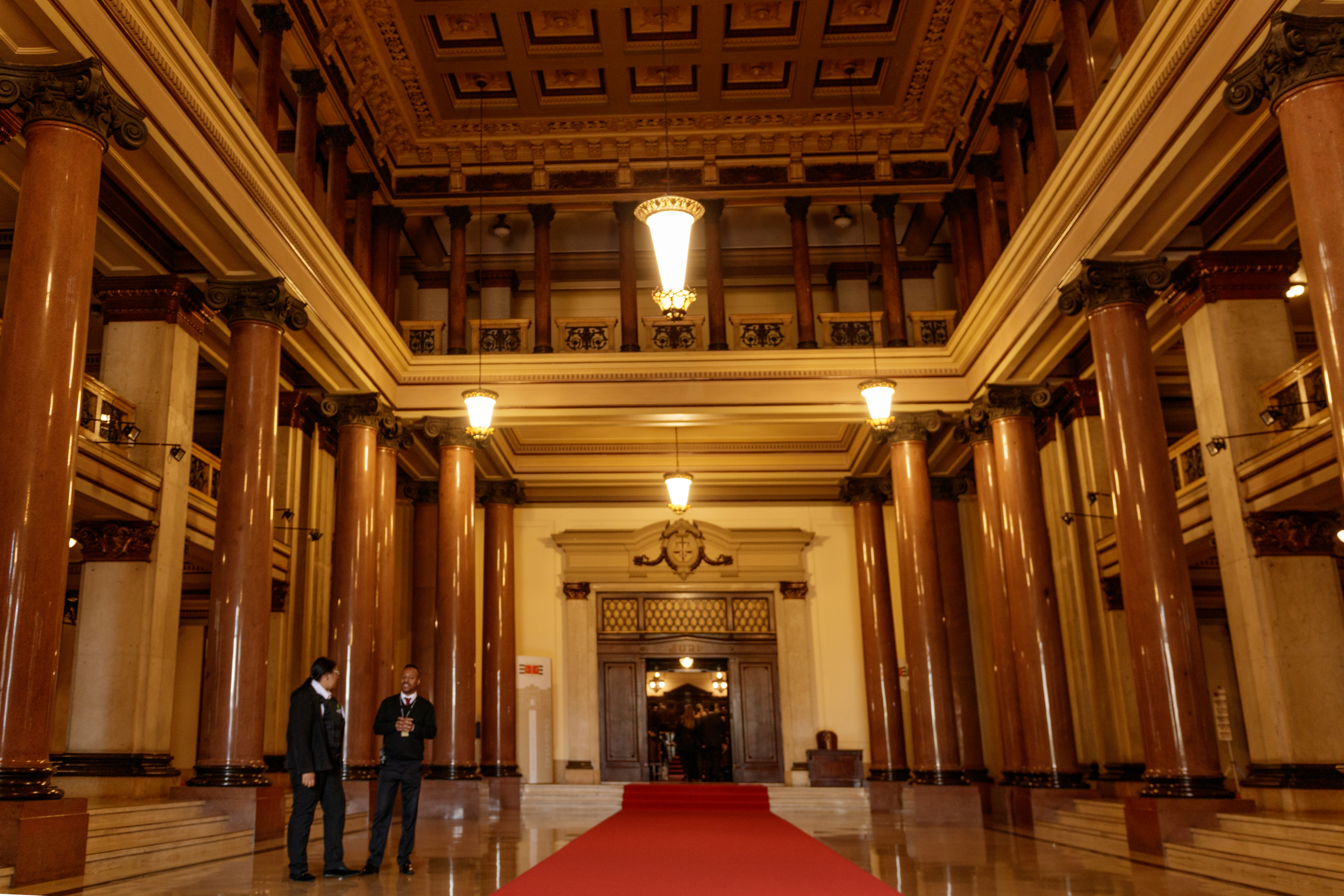
Passos Perdidos Room

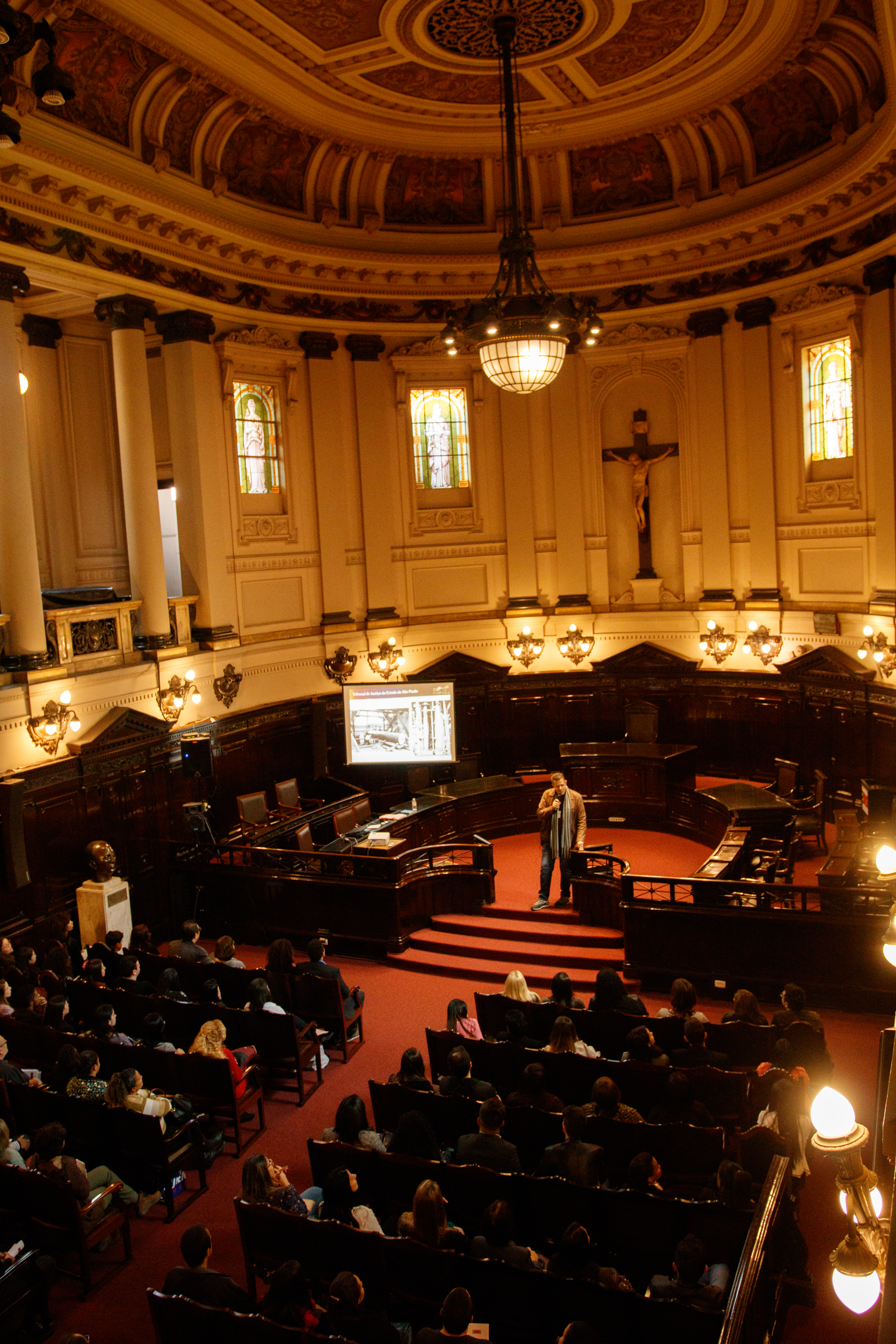
Jury Room

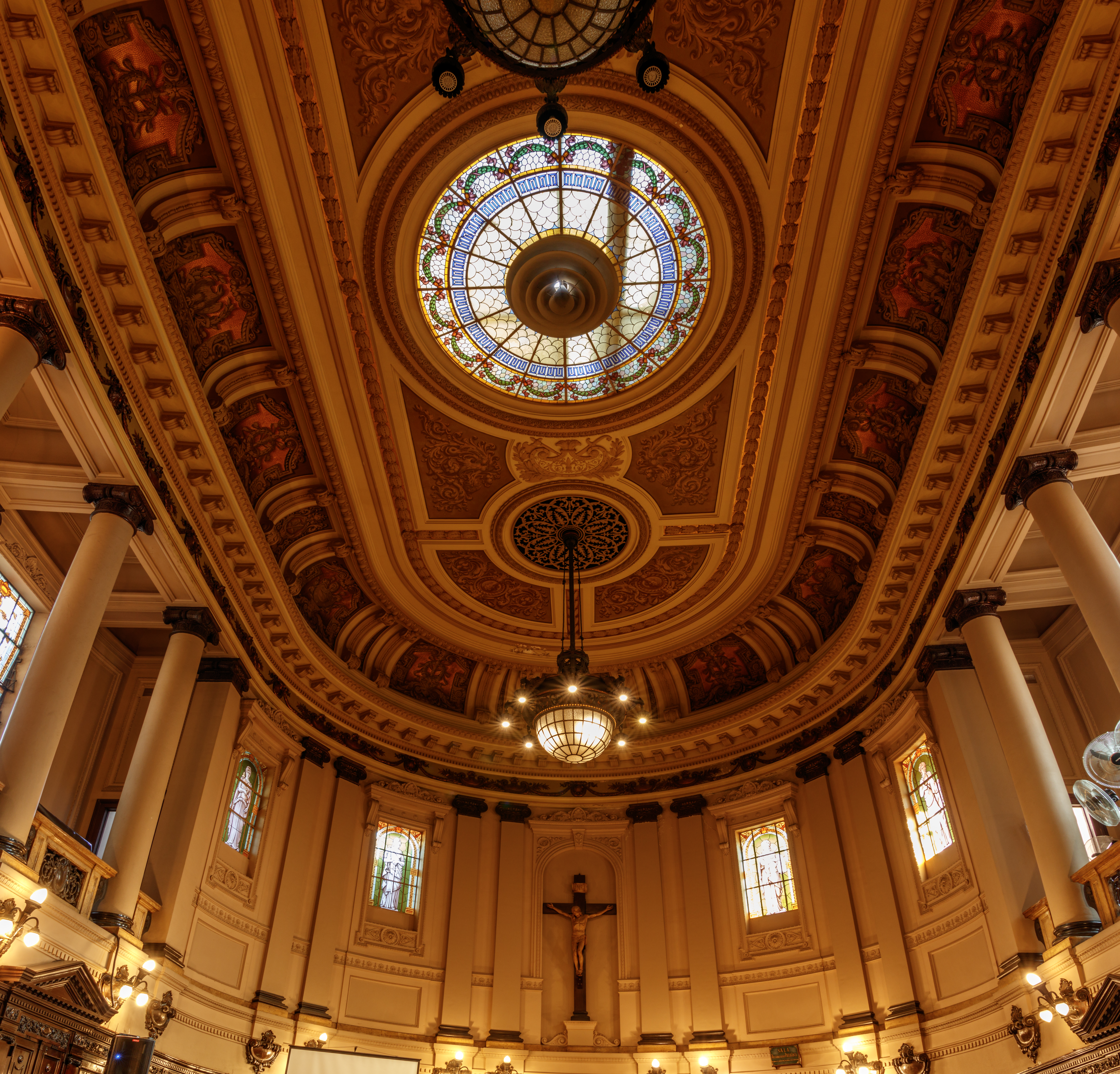
Jury Room ceiling details

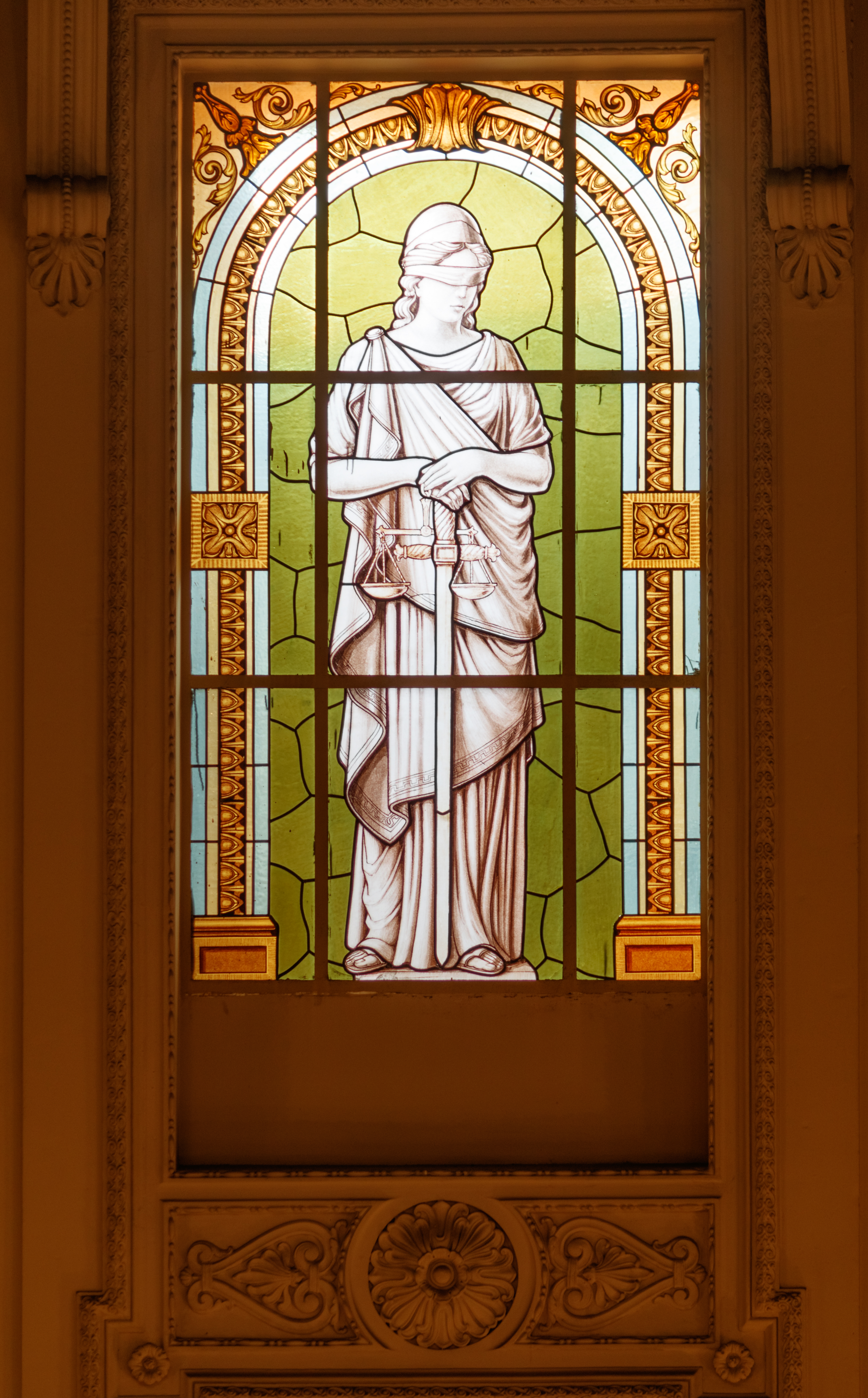
Stained glass portraying the goddess Themis, symbol of justice in the Jury Room

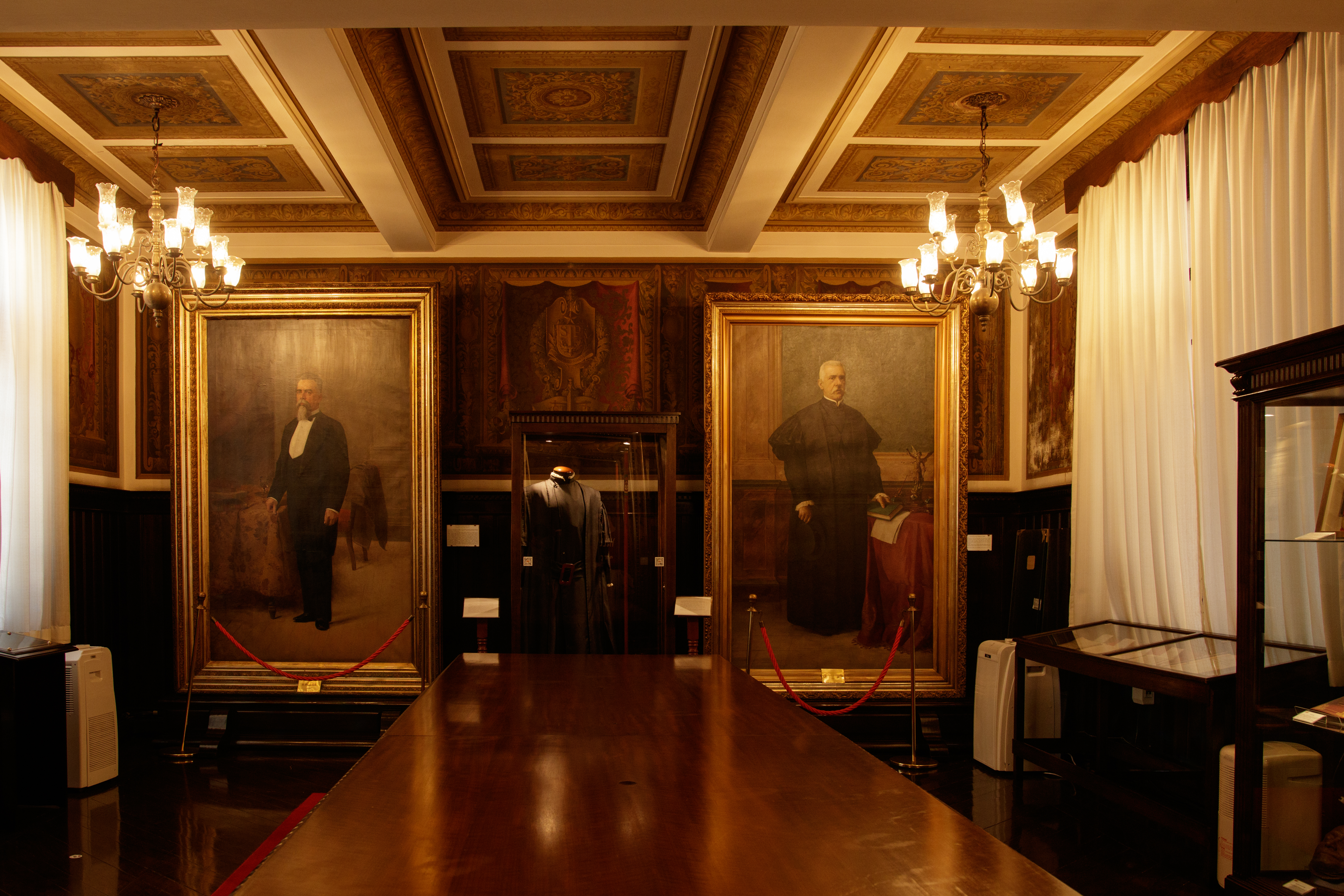
Desembargardor Emeric Levai Room

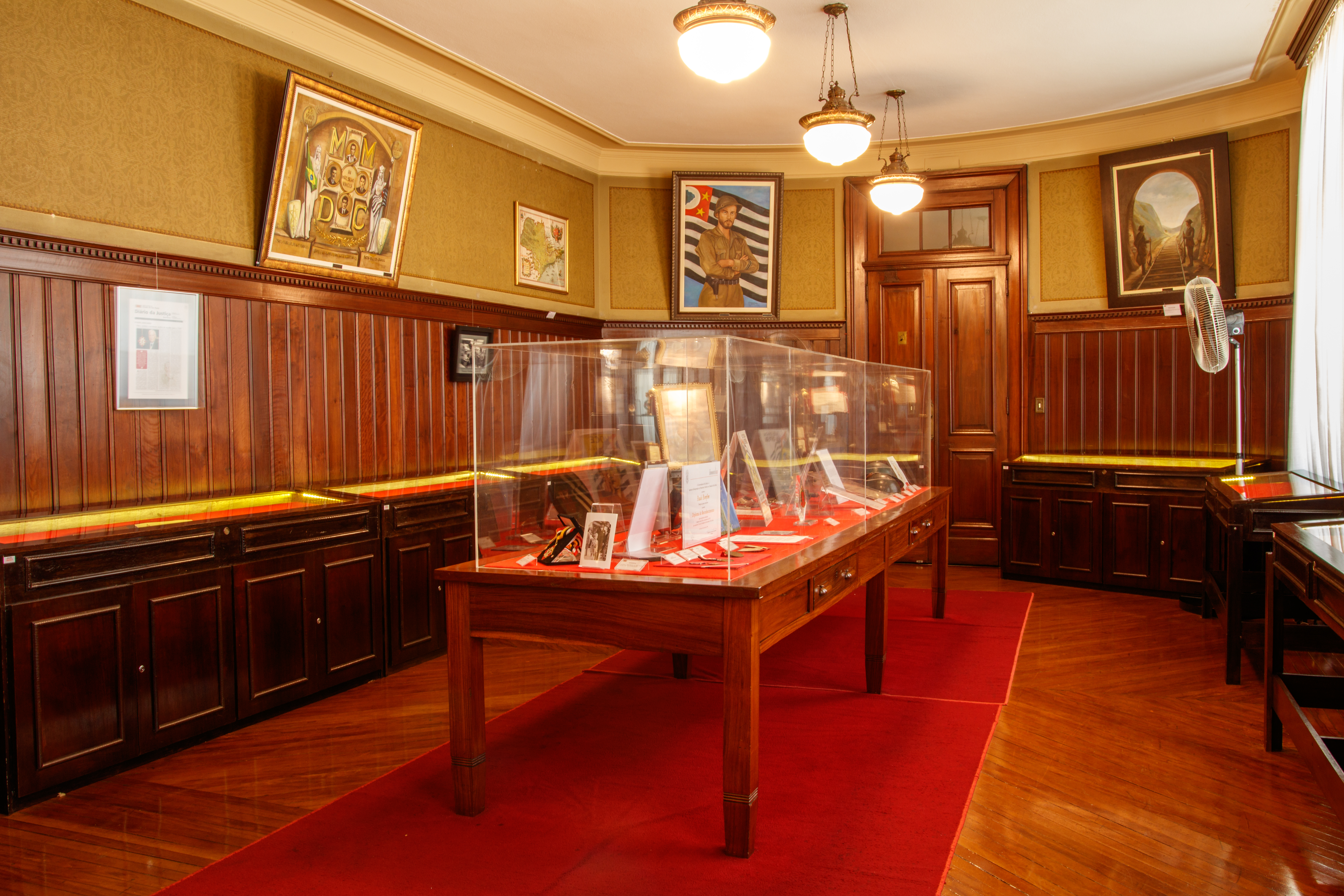
Poet Paulo Bomfim Cultural Space

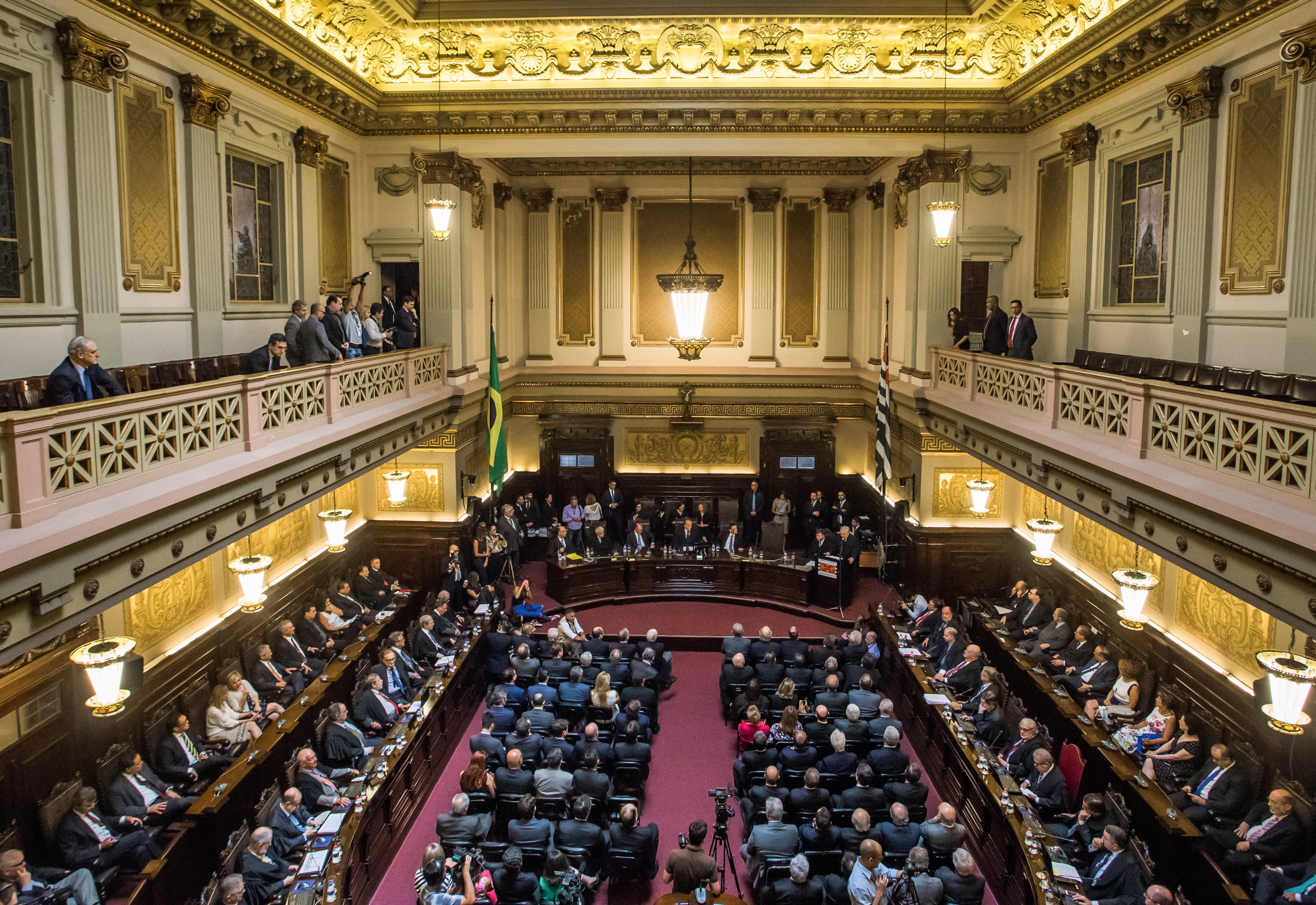
Noble Hall ("Salão Nobre") "Ministro Manoel da Costa Manso"

== See also ==
- Court of Justice (Brazil)
- Palace of Justice (Manaus)
