= Palace of Justice (Pristina) =

- Pallati i Drejtësisë
- Interactive map of the Palace of Justice area

General information
- Status: Open
- Type: Civic
- Location: Pristina, Kosovo
- Coordinates: 42.633386°N 21.173455°E
- Construction started: 23 June 2011
- Inaugurated: 12 January 2014
- Cost: Approximately €30 million
- Client: European Union; Government of Kosovo

The Palace of Justice (Albanian: Pallati i Drejtësisë; Serbian: Палата правде / Palata pravde) in Pristina is the seat of most of the courts of the Republic of Kosovo. It is located in the capital city of Kosovo, Pristina. Its construction began on 23 June 2011 and continued into 2014. The Palace of Justice is a project co-funded by the European Union and the government of Kosovo at an approximate cost of €30 million.

== Institutions ==
Institutions to be located within the building:

- Constitutional Court
- Kosovo Judicial Council
- Supreme Court
- Commercial Court
- High Minor Offences Court
- District Court of Pristina
- Municipal Court of Prishtina
- Municipal Minor Offences Court of Pristina
- Special Prosecutor Office
- State prosecutor Office
- District Public Prosecutor Office of Pristina
- Municipal Public prosecutor Office
- Liaison institutions
