= Church of Saint Sebastian (Manaus) =

Brazilian religious temple

- Igreja de São Sebastião
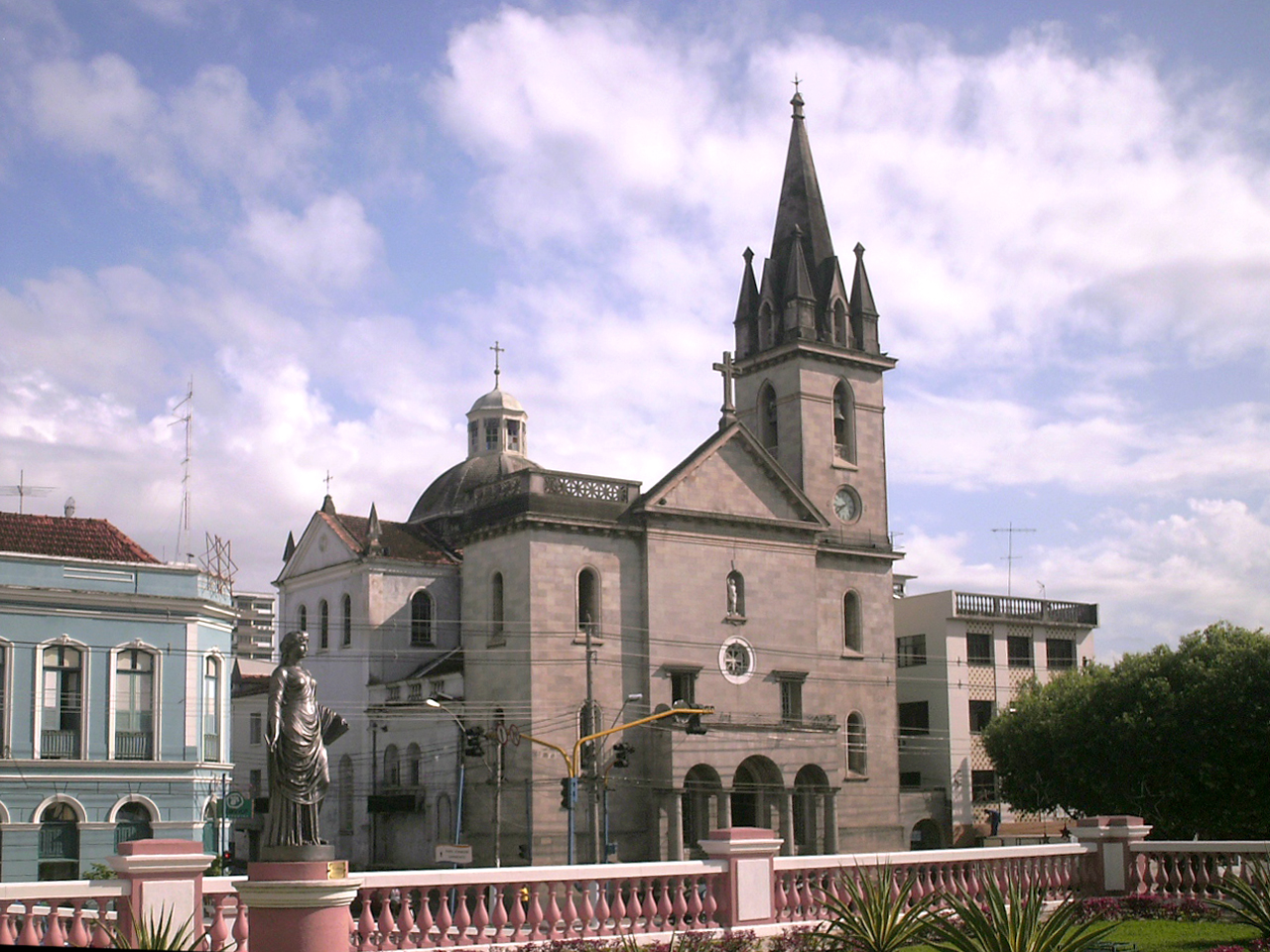
- View of the church from the patio of the Amazon Theater

- Location within Brazil
- 03°07′47.40″S 60°01′21.51″W
- Location: Manaus, Amazonas; Brazil
- Website: https://arquidiocesedemanaus.org.br/

History
- Founded: September 7, 1888; 138 years ago

Architecture
- Architect: Sebastião José Basílio Pyrrho
- Architectural type: Eclecticism

Administration
- Archdiocese: Roman Catholic Archdiocese of Manaus

Clergy
- Archbishop: Luiz Soares Vieira
- Bishop: Mário Pasqualotto

The Church of Saint Sebastian (Portuguese: Igreja de São Sebastião) is a religious temple owned by the Archdiocese of Manaus. It is located on 10 de Julho Street and its main facade faces the Largo de São Sebastião, in the center of the city of Manaus. Inaugurated in 1888 and converted into a parish in 1912, the church is one of the oldest in the city. In 1988, it was listed as a Historical Heritage Site by the Amazonas State Council for the Defense of Historical and Artistic Heritage - CEDPHA.

After more than 130 years, the church still stands out for its devotion to hundreds of Catholics, privileged location and eclectic style, with elements of several different genres, such as Gothic and Neoclassical. Its interior is characterized by European panels and stained glass windows, typical of the beginning of the rubber cycle in the state.

== History ==
=== Early days ===
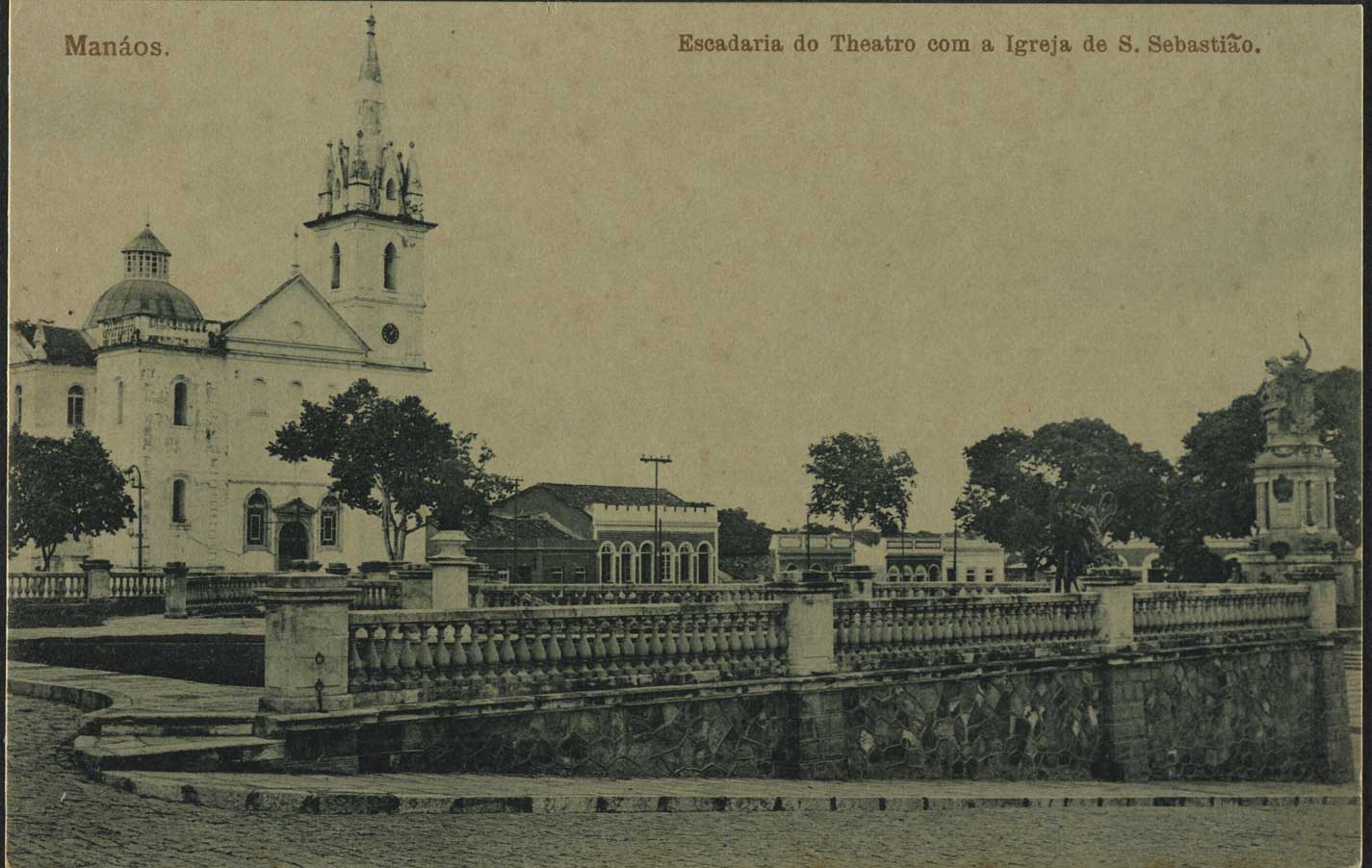
Church of Saint Sebastian in 1909.

The first chapel of Saint Sebastian built in Manaus dates back to 1859, and served as a place of worship for the lay members of the Brotherhood of Saint Sebastian. It was a wooden chapel, covered in straw and installed in the old Conde D'Eu Street, now Monsenhor Coutinho, in the center of the city.

However, the oldest reference to the beginning of the construction of the current church is from 1868, when the provincial president Leonardo Ferreira Marques, in his Report on the Transition of Government, dated November 26 of that year, said that the work on the Chapel of Saint Sebastian, ordered by Leonardo Malcher, was about to begin.

The chapel was completed in December 1870, the same date as the arrival of Friar Jesualdo Macchetti de Lucca. It is worth mentioning that he died on June 11, 1902, and was buried in the São João Batista Cemetery. Three decades later, on April 27, 1933, his remains were transferred to the church he had helped to build. After the association with the Franciscan friars, this chapel was replaced by a larger project, led by Friar Jesualdo Macchetti.

=== Project ===
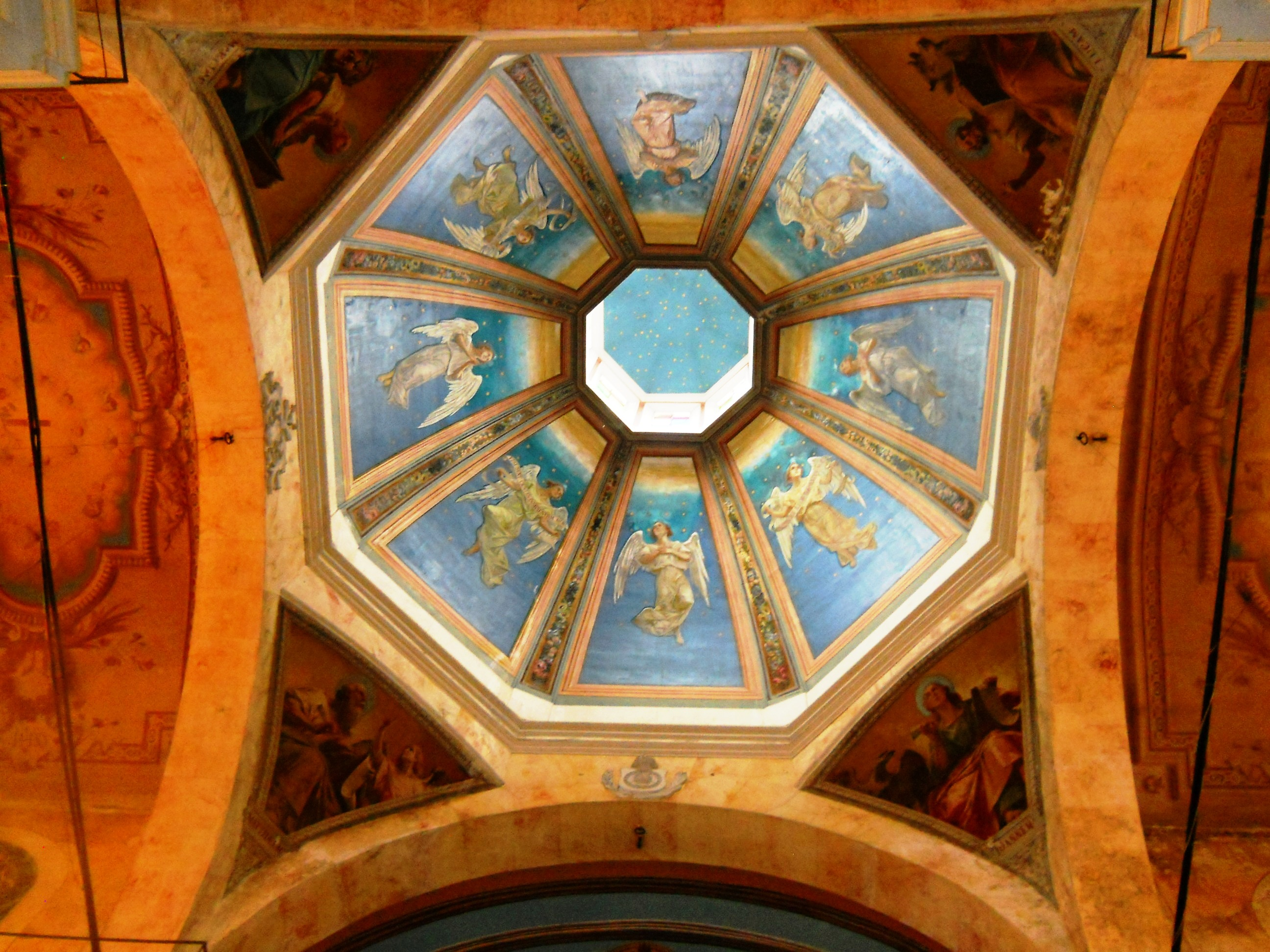
Arts in the church dome.

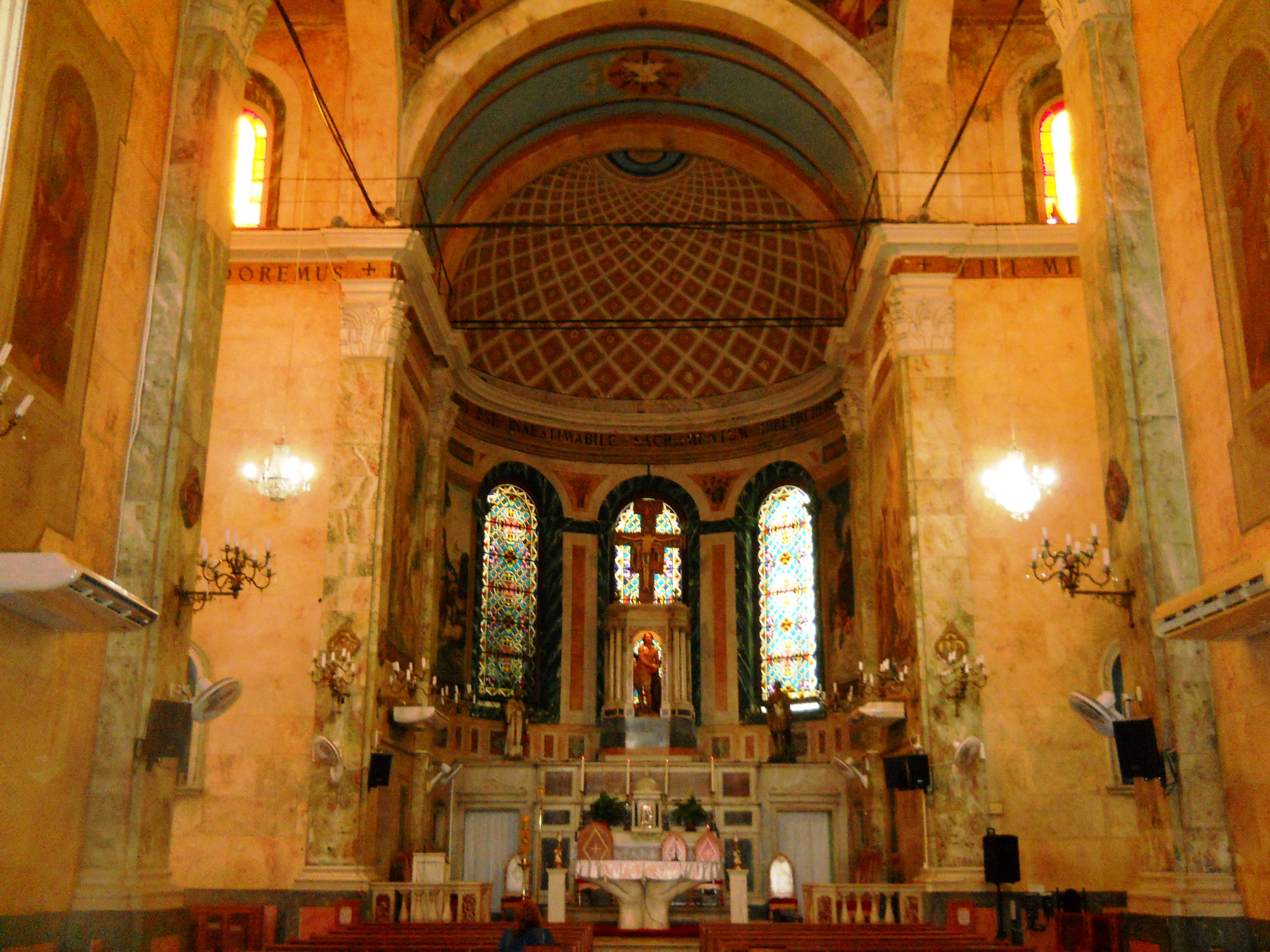
Inside the Church of Saint Sebastian.

The floor plan for the new church was designed by Sebastião José Basílio Pyrrho, the same architect who projected the current Metropolitan Cathedral of Manaus.

In May 1877, with the church still under construction, the president of the province, Domingos Jaci Monteiro, authorized the use of materials left over from the construction of the current Mother Church to build the new temple of Saint Sebastian.

Seven years later, on September 24, 1884, Ambrósio Bruno Cadis was hired to build the ceiling, architrave, stucco, vault ceilings and altars.

=== Inauguration ===
However, in October 1886, Cadis retired from the city and left the church unfinished. His contract was terminated the following year, on January 21, 1887, and the work was taken over by the Public Works Department.

Once the difficulties had been overcome, on September 7, 1888, at 7:30 am, Friar Jesualdo Macchetti was able to bless the new and current Church of Saint Sebastian in the presence of civil, military and ecclesiastical authorities and the faithful. Around 1890, an attempt was made to build a second church, but this never came to fruition.

On August 15, 1906, the church was handed over to the Cappuccini Fathers from Italy. On September 14, 1909, when they left for the mission in Pará, they were replaced by Italian Cappuccini from Umbria.

=== Ascension to parish status ===
On September 8, 1912, the Church of Saint Sebastian celebrated its ascension to the category of parish. It was the third Catholic temple in Manaus to gain major religious status, after the Metropolitan Cathedral of Manaus and the Our Lady of Los Remedios Church. On September 8, 2012, the church celebrated the centenary of its promotion to the category of parish.

=== Weddings ===
Due to its tradition, the Church of Saint Sebastian is considered one of the favorites for weddings in Manaus. The queue to get married in the church can be as long as a year, but often regarded as worth well to get married in the church.

== See also ==
- Amazon Theatre
- Monument Abertura dos Portos
- Brazilian Belle Époque
