= List of women neuroscientists =

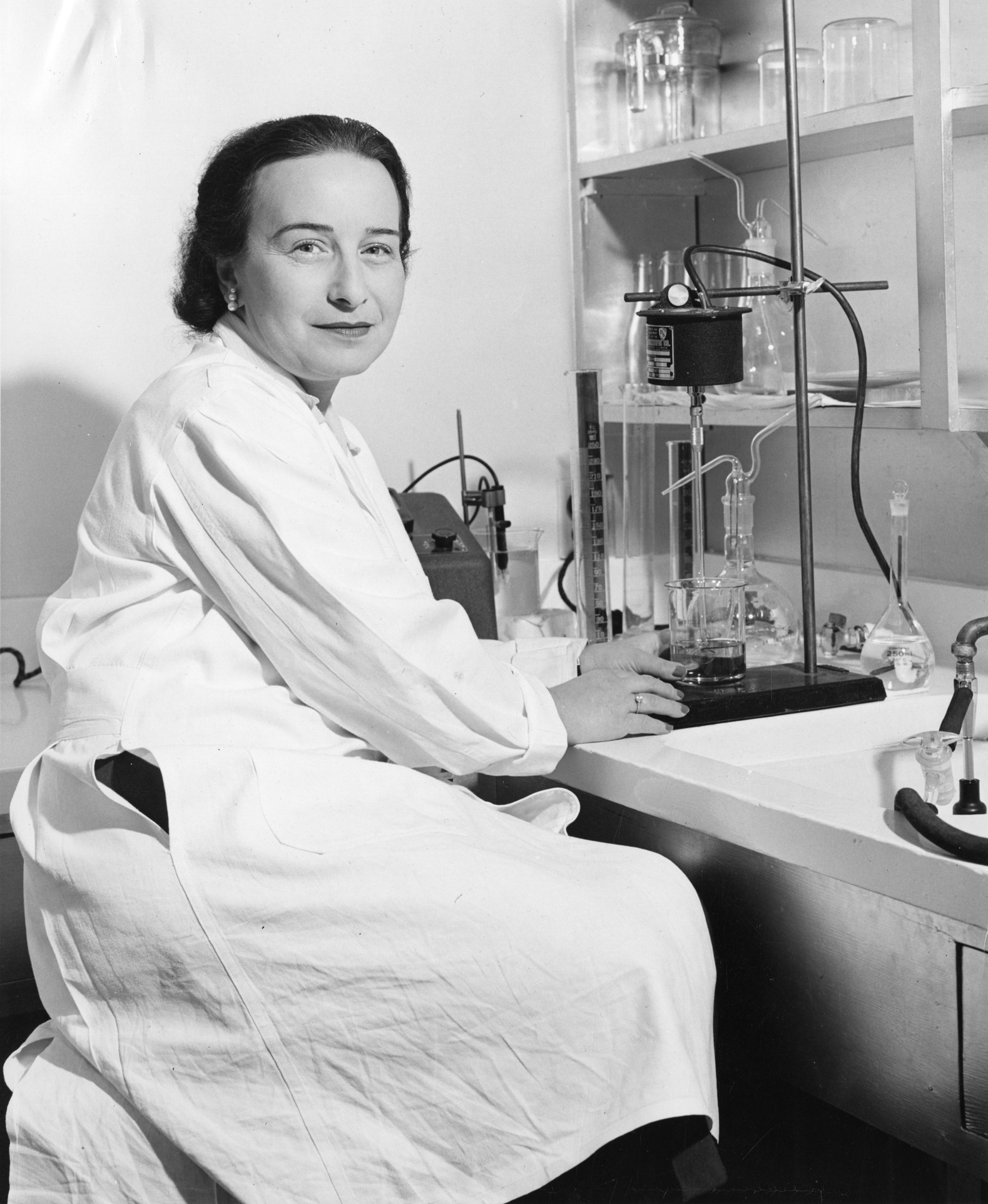
Elizabeth Roboz Einstein (1904–1995), pioneering biochemist and neuroscientist from Hungary.

The following is a list of female neuroscientists by nationality – notable women who are well known for their work in the field of neuroscience.

== Argentina ==
- Cecilia Bouzat (born 1961), biochemist studying neurological disorders
- Maria G. Castro (fl 2000s), professor of neurosurgery, University of Michigan Medical School

== Australia ==
- Lyn Beazley (born 1944), British-born Australian neuroscientist and educator
- Leeanne Carey (born 1959), neuroscientist in occupational therapy and stroke rehabilitation and recovery research
- Adrienne Fairhall (fl 2000s), computational neuroscientist and educator
- Una Lucy Fielding (1888–1969), neuroanatomist remembered for discovering the vascular link between the hypothalamus and the pituitary gland
- Mary Galea (born 1951), physiotherapist and neuroscientist at the University of Melbourne
- Glenda Halliday (fl 2008), neuroscientist at the University of Sydney, NHMRC research fellow
- Muireann Irish (fl 2013), cognitive neuropsychologist at the University of Sydney
- Jee Hyun Kim (fl. from 2004), behavioral neuroscientist focusing on emotional learning and memory during childhood
- Natalie Matosin (fl. 2012), scientist researching the impacts of stress and its role in mental illness
- Elspeth McLachlan (born 1942), world authority on neural pathways within the autonomic nervous system
- Pat Michie (retired 2009), emeritus professor of psychology at Australia's University of Newcastle
- Kathryn North (fl. from 1994), paediatric physician, neurologist, and clinical geneticist working on cognitive deficits in neurofibromatosis type 1 and intervention strategies for children with learning disabilities and inherited myopathies
- Jennie Ponsford (fl. 2000s), neuroscientist researching the negative consequences of traumatic brain injury related to fatigue, sleep disturbance, attentional problems, mood and behavioural disturbances
- Sandra Rees (born 1942), research into the pathogenesis of brain injury
- Linda Richards, currently researching development of the cortical midline
- Nicole Rinehart (fl. from 2000), focus on autism, Asperger's disorder and ADHD
- Lesley Joy Rogers (born 1943), emeritus professor of neuroscience at Australia's University of New England
- Renae Ryan (fl. 2000s), neuroscientists and pharmacologist promoting gender equity, diversity and inclusion
- Ingrid Scheffer (born 1958), paediatric neurologist and senior research fellow focusing on epilepsy

== Austria ==
- Alexandra Adler (1901–2001), neurologist remembered for her work on the brain of a multiple sclerosis victim and for her research on posttraumatic stress disorder
- Elisabeth Binder (fl. 2000s), neuroscientist specializing in the study of mood and anxiety disorders
- Melly Oitzl (born 1955), behavioral neuroscientist focusing on relationships between stress, cognition and emotion

== Brazil ==
- Suzana Herculano-Houzel (born 1972), focus on neuroanatomy
- Anna Christina Nobre (born 1963), UK-based Brazilian neuroscientist researching neural systems supporting cognitive functions in the human brain

== Canada ==
- Rosemary Bagot (born 1981), researching the mechanisms of altered brain function in depression
- Frances Champagne (fl. from 2007), focus on molecular neuroscience, maternal behavior, and epigenetics
- Sherry Chou (fl 2014), neuroscientist focusing on neurocritical care
- Anne Churchland (fl. from 2014), neuroscientist focusing on the function of the posterior parietal cortex in cognitive processes
- Meaghan Creed (fl 2016), research into neuromodulation
- Karen Davis (fl. from 1990), focusing on the mechanisms underlying acute and chronic pain and temperature perception, the influence of attention, and plasticity
- Allison J. Doupe (1954–2014), psychiatrist, biologist, and neuroscientist focusing on avian neurobiology and communication
- Lillian Dyck (born 1945), Saskatchewan senator, formerly a neuroscientist and dean at the University of Saskatchewan
- Gillian Einstein (born 1952), American-born Canadian neuroscientist focusing on the anatomy of the female brain
- Alison Fleming (fl 2004), neuroscientist working on mothering instincts and maternal behaviour
- Ariel Garten (born 1979), clothing designer and scientist exploring the intersection of art and neuroscience
- Isabel Gauthier (born 1971), cognitive neuroscientist and journal editor
- Mireille Gillings (born 1971), US-based Canadian neurobiologist and entrepreneur
- Rachel Sarah Herz (fl. from 1992), psychologist and cognitive neuroscientist focusing on the psychology of smell
- Judy Illes (born 1960), professor of neurology focusing on neuroethics
- Sheena Josselyn (fl. 2018), neuroscientist studying the neural basis of memory at the University of Toronto
- Ingrid Johnsrude (fl. from 1997), neuroscientist and professor focusing on brain structure and language ability, and degenerative brain diseases in the elderly
- Sheena Josselyn (fl. from 1990s), neuroscientist studying the neural basis of memory
- Sandi Lam (fl. from 2010's), neurosurgeon studying novel uses of neuroendoscopy in minimally invasive epilepsy surgery
- Daphne Maurer (fl. from late 1980s), experimental psychologist focusing on child development, vision and synaesthesia
- Brenda Milner (born 1918), British-Canadian neuroscientist focusing on clinical neuropsychology
- Kathryn Mary Murphy (fl. since early 1990s), neuroscientists studying the development and plasticity of the brain
- Cecilia Moens (fl 1994), research into development of hindbrain neurons
- Lorina Naci (fl. 2010s), Albanian-born Canadian psychologist and neuroscientist known for developing a method for communicating with patients in a persistent vegetative state
- Caroline Palmer (fl 1990), research into behavioural and neural foundations
- Isabelle Peretz (born 1956), professor of psychology specializing in music cognition
- Maria Natasha Rajah (fl 2007), cognitive neuroscientist working on episodic memory, ageing and dementia
- Jane Roskams (fl. from early 1990s), Isle of Man-born Canadian neuroscientist interested in Brain Big Data and Open Data sharing
- Deboleena Roy (fl. from 2008), neuroscientist focusing on reproductive neuroendocrinology and molecular biology
- Jane Rylett (fl 1994), molecular neurobiologist
- Lisa Saksida (fl 2000), touchscreen-based cognitive assessment
- Rebecca Saxe (fl 2008), professor of cognitive neuroscience at MIT
- Justine Sergent (1950–1994), Lebanese-born Canadian neuroscience researcher specializing in the functional neuroanatomy of face processing
- Bernice Shanet (born 1929), neurophysiologist specializing in neuroregeneration research
- Rae Silver (fl. 1997), neuroendocrinologist and neuroscientist researching the suprachiasmatic nucleus of the hypothalamus
- Debra W. Soh (born 1990), science columnist, sex researcher and psychologist
- Bojana Stefanovic (fl 2005), neuroscientist researching functional brain neuroimaging
- Jane Stewart (fl. from 1980s), neuroscientist active in psychology, psychiatry, and psychopharmacology
- Indre Viskontas (fl. since 2000s), Lithuanian-Canadian cognitive neuroscientist and operatic soprano
- Anna Weinberg (fl. 2014), psychologist, Canada Research Chair in Clinical Neuroscience, McGill University
- Catharine Winstanley (fl 2004), British-born Canadian behavioural neuroscientist
- Sandra Witelson (fl. 1999), neuroscientist best known for her analysis of specimens from Albert Einstein's brain

== China ==
- Yang Dan (fl. from 1994), Chinese-born scientist based in the US specializing in neural circuits controlling sleep and the function of the prefrontal cortex
- Fan Wang (fl 1998), research at MIT on neural circuits underlying touch, pain and anesthesia
- Li Gan (fl 1996), researching mechanisms of microglia dysfunction in neurodegeneration
- Nancy Ip (born 1955), Hong Kong neuroscientist
- Lily Jan (born 1947), neuroscientist investigating the neuromuscular junction in Drosophila fly larvae
- Li-Huei Tsai (fl. from 1990), Taiwanese neuroscientist based in the US known for her work on neurological disorders that affect learning and memory
- Dayu Lin (fl 2000s), Chinese neuroscientist based in the U.S. studying neural circuits underlying aggression in rodents.
- Hailan Hu (fl 2000s), explores neural mechanisms underlying social behaviors and psychiatric diseases
- Guo-li Ming (fl 2002), researching stem cells to model genetic and environmental risk for brain disorders
- Hongkui Zeng (fl 2011), headed team creating the Allen Mouse Connectivity Atlas
- Li Zhaoping (born 1964), computational neuroscientist and vision scientist known for the V1 Saliency Hypothesis.

== Croatia ==
- Marta Zlatic (born 1977), neuroscientist, group leader of the MRC Laboratory of Molecular Biology, Cambridge, UK

== Cyprus ==
- Panayiota Poirazi (born 1974), neuroscientist known for modelling dendritic computations, member of the European Molecular Biology Organization

== Czech Republic ==
- Eva Syková (born 1944), neuroscientist researching ionic and volume homeostasis

== Denmark ==
- Gudrun Boysen (born 1939), neurologist researching the causes and effects of strokes
- Gitte Moos Knudsen (born 1959), translational neurobiologist and clinical neurologist
- Maiken Nedergaard (fl. from late 1980s), neuroscientist known for discovering the glymphatic system
- Milena Penkowa (born 1973), neuroscientist guilty of scientific misconduct

== Finland ==
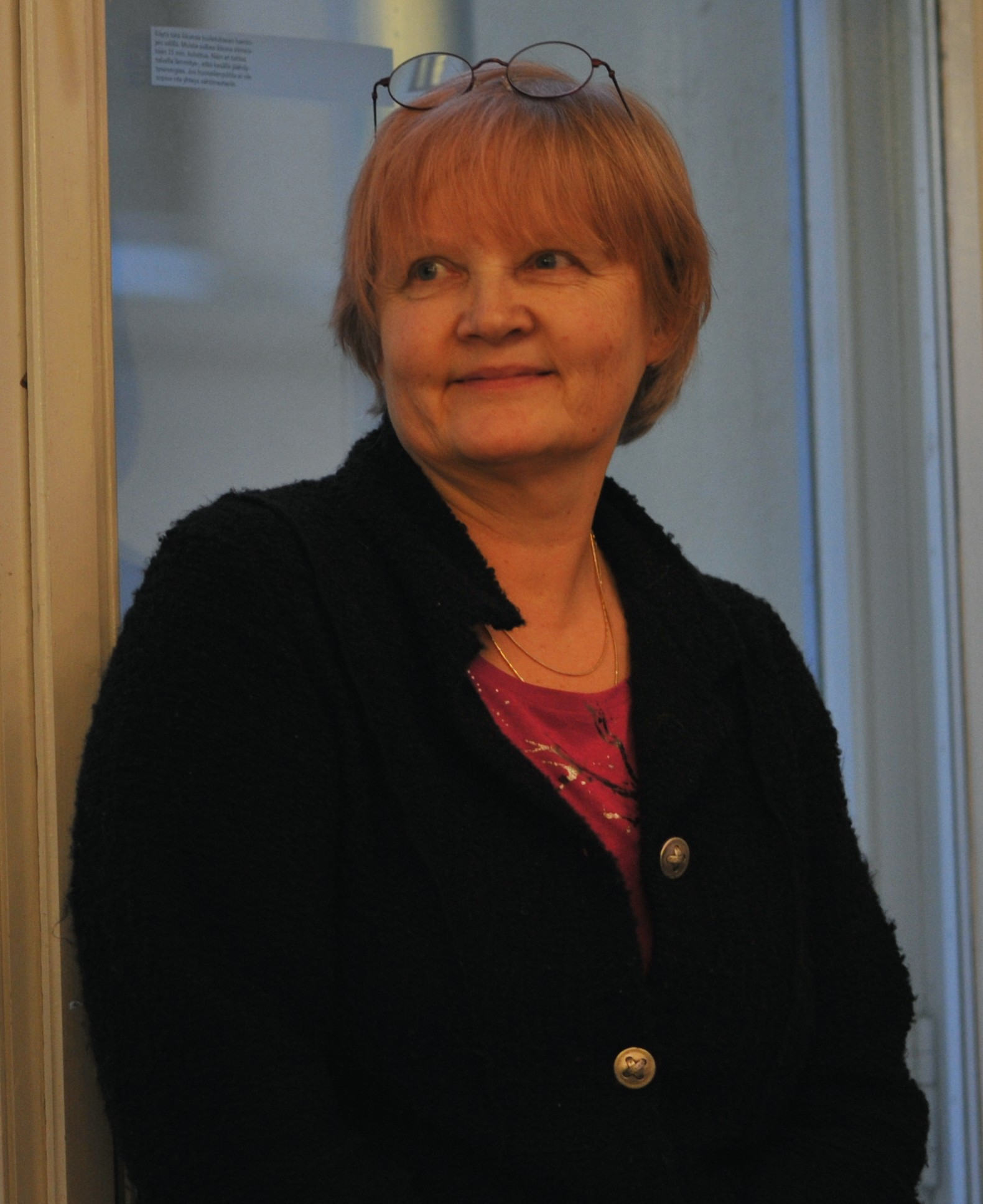
Riitta Hari, Finnish neuroscientist, at the Science Forum 2011 in Helsinki.

- Riitta Hari (born 1948), neuroscientist known for her work on the understanding of healthy and diseased human cortex development
- Miia Kivipelto (born 1973), neuroscientist researching dementia and Alzheimer's disease

== France ==
- Denise Albe-Fessard (1916–2003), neuroscientist known for her research into the central nervous system pain pathways
- Angélique Arvanitaki (1901–1983), neuroscientist known for her research into the electrical activity of neurons
- Aurore Avarguès-Weber (born 1983), cognitive neuroscientist researching the behaviour of bees
- Anne Beaumanoir (born 1923), neurophysiologist and resistance worker who headed the neurophysiology department of the University Hospital of Geneva
- Cécile Charrier (born 1983), neuroscientist researcher, recipient of the 2021 Irène Joliot-Curie “Young Female Scientist of the Year” award.
- Augusta Déjerine-Klumpke (1859–1927), American-born French neuroanatomist known for co-authoring the two-volume book on the anatomy of nerve centers Anatomie des Centres Nerveux
- Brigitte Kieffer (born 1958), molecular neurobiologist known for researching opiate receptors
- Laurence Lanfumey (born 1954), neuroscientist specializing in preclinical research on neuroscience and molecular neuropsychopharmacology
- Marcelle Lapicque (1873–1960), neurophysiologist known for her research on nerve impulses and the effects of poisons
- Gabrielle Charlotte Lévy (1886–1934), neurologist for whose work the Roussy–Lévy syndrome and the Lhermitte-Lévy syndrome are named
- Isabelle Mansuy (born 1965), professor of neuroepigenetics at the University of Zurich, Switzerland
- Christine Petit (born 1948), geneticist known for pioneering work on the genetics of hearing and deafness
- Catherine Vidal (born 1951) is a neuroscientist specialized on difference between male and female brain
- Cécile Vogt-Mugnier (1875–1962), neurologist known for extensive cytoarchitectonic studies on the brain
- Claire Wyart (born 1977), biophysicist and neuroscientist studying the circuits underlying the control of locomotion, and chevalier of the Ordre National du Mérite.

== Germany ==
- Katrin Amunts (born 1962), neuroscientist known for brain mapping
- Laura Busse (born c.1977), researching neural circuits underlying visual processing at LMU Munich
- Angela D. Friederici (born 1952), expert in neuropsychology and linguistics
- Nadine Gogolla (fl. 2000s), neuroscientist known for decoding facial expressions in mice as emotion-like and correlating this to neural activity
- Magdalena Götz (born 1962), neuroscientist noted for her study of glial cells
- Sonja Hofer (born 1977), professor at the Sainsbury Wellcome Centre for Neural Circuits and Behaviour
- Kerstin Krieglstein (fl. 2018), researching molecular neurobiology, neuronal survival and ontogenetic cell death
- Eva-Maria Mandelkow (fl. from 1970s), neuroscientist and Alzheimer's Disease researcher
- Petra Ritter (born 1974), neuroscientist applying computational neuroscience to brain simulations
- Anne Schaefer (fl. 2009), developed the TRAP technique to reveal transcriptional profiles
- Constance Scharff (born 1959), zoologist and neuroethologist researching birdsong and neurogenesis
- Sigrid Schmitz (born 1961), neuroscientist researching gender and science technology with a focus on brain sciences and contemporary neurocultures
- Tania Singer (born 1969), psychologist and social neuroscientist
- Marthe Vogt (1903–2003), remembered for her important contributions to the understanding of the role of neurotransmitters in the brain

== Greece ==
- Sophia Frangou (fl. from 1990s), US-based neuroscientist researching the pathophysiological processes underlying psychosis
- Nancy Papalopulu (fl. from 1990), UK-based neuroscientist researching how the timing of neurogenesis is regulated during vertebrate development

== Hungary ==
- Elizabeth Roboz Einstein (1904–1995), biochemist and neuroscientist known for purifying and characterizing myelin basic protein

== India ==
- T. S. Kanaka (1932–2018), Asia's first female neurosurgeon
- Sandhya Koushika (fl. from 2000s), neuroscientist focusing on regulation of axonal transport within nerve cells
- Vijayalakshmi Ravindranath (born 1953), neuroscientist focused on the study of brain related disorders
- Deblina Sarkar (fl. 2018), nanoscale biosensors at MIT
- M. V. Padma Srivastava (born 1965), neurologist, medical academic and writer known for the Acute Stroke Programme
- Shubha Tole (born 1967), neuroscientist investigating the development and evolution of the mammalian brain
- Vidita Vaidya (fl. from 2000), neuroscientist researching molecular psychiatry and the neurocircuitry of emotion
- Shashi Wadhwa (born 1948), known for anatomy and developmental neuroscience

== Ireland ==
- Sabina Brennan (fl. 2011), neuroscientist at Trinity College Dublin, "Hello Brain" project
- Eleanor Maguire (born 1970), researching episodic memory in the context of wider cognition
- Mary Reilly (fl. 2000s), neurologist studying peripheral neuropathy

== Israel ==
- Tamar Flash (fl. 1987), professor at Weizmann Institute of Science
- Kalanit Grill-Spector is a neuroscientist professor investigating the visual system at Stanford University
- Daphna Joel (born 1967), behavioural neuroscientist at Tel Aviv University
- Nilli Lavi is a psychologist and neuroscience professor at University College London
- Yael Niv (fl. 2012), neuroscientist studying animal reinforcement learning at Princeton University
- Michal Rivlin is a neuroscientist investigating the retina at the Weizmann Institute of Science
- Asya Rolls (2000s) is an Israeli psychoneuroimmunologist exploring how the nervous system affects immune responses and thus physical health
- Daniela Schiller (born 1972), known for work on memory reconsolidation
- Michal Schwartz is a professor of neuroimmunology at the Weizmann Institute of Science
- Tali Sharot is a cognitive neuroscientist at University College London
- Hamutal Slovin (born 1967), neuroscientist studying the visual system using optical imaging
- Hermona Soreq (born 1947), known for the signaling of acetylcholine and its relevance in stress responses and neurodegenerative diseases
- Naomi Habib, computational neuroscientist at the Hebrew University of Jerusalem

== Italy ==
- Cristina Alberini (fl. 1990s), neuroscientist studying the biological mechanisms of long-term memory
- Paola Arlotta (born 1971), professor of stem cell and regenerative biology at Harvard University
- Camilla Bellone (born c. 1975) is an Italian neuroscientist exploring the molecular mechanisms and neural circuits underlying social behavior and probes how defects at the molecular and circuit level give rise to psychiatric disease states
- Raffaella Bosurgi (fl. 2010s), neuroscientist and executive editor of PLOS Medicine
- Valeria Gazzola (born c. 1977), neuroscientist at the University of Amsterdam, studying the neural basis of empathy and embodied cognition
- Maria Luisa Gorno-Tempini (fl. from 2001), neuroscientist focusing on behavioral neurology, particularly the neural substrate of language and memory
- Giordana Grossi (fl. 2007), cognitive neuroscientist and professor of psychology at SUNY New Paltz, New York
- Rita Levi-Montalcini (1909–2012), Nobel laureate for her work in neurobiology
- Raffaella Rumiati (fl. from 2003), cognitive neuroscientist
- Maria Grazia Spillantini (fl. from 1987), researching the mechanisms leading to neurodegeneration

== Japan ==
- Noriko Osumi (fl. from 1980s), specializing in neuroembryology and developmental neuroscience to reveal the scheme of human mind in terms of brain development

== Kazakhstan ==
- Alexandra Elbakyan (born 1988), known for creating the Sci-Hub

== Lebanon ==
- Huda Zoghbi (born 1954), Lebanese-American geneticist known for research in the Rett syndrome and spinocerebellar ataxia type 1

== Lithuania ==
- Urtė Neniškytė (born 1983), researching the interaction of neurons and immune cells in the brain

== Luxembourg ==
- Christiane Linster (born 1962), Systems and Computational Neuroscience

== Mexico ==
- Mónica Andrea López Hidalgo, researching astrocytes, cognitive function, and age-related changes

== Netherlands ==
- Beatrice de Gelder (born 1944), cognitive neuroscientist and neuropsychologist at Tilburg University
- Astrid Linthorst (fl. from late 1990s), neuroscientist specializing in the neurochemistry and neuroendocrinology of stress and behavior
- Sabine Spijker (fl. from late 1990s), neuroscientist researching the effect of neuropsychiatric ailments on cognition
- Eveline Crone (born 1975), professor of cognitive neuroscience and developmental psychology, known for her work on the function of risky behaviours in pubertal adolescents

== New Zealand ==
- Marianne Fillenz (1924–2012), Romanian-born New Zealand neuroscientist known for research on he physiology of the autonomic nervous system
- Kate Jeffery (born 1962), professor of behavioural neuroscience at University College London
- Jenny Morton (fl. from 1991), neurobiologist specializing in neurodegenerative diseases

== Norway ==
- Marianne Fyhn (born 1973), biologist known for the discovery of grid cells and spatial coding in entorhinal cortex
- Siri Leknes (fl. 2008), neuroscientist known for directing he Leknes Affective Brain Lab
- May-Britt Moser (born 1963), psychologist, neuroscientist and Nobel laureate known for work on grid cells
- Kirsten Kjelsberg Osen (born 1928), pioneered the neuroanatomy of the auditory pathways and the first female professor of medicine in Norway
- Kristine Beate Walhovd (born 1976), psychologist and neuroscientist researching lifespan changes in brain and cognition

== Pakistan ==
- Aafia Siddiqui (born 1972), neuroscientist convicted of seven counts of attempted murder and assault of US personnel

== Poland ==
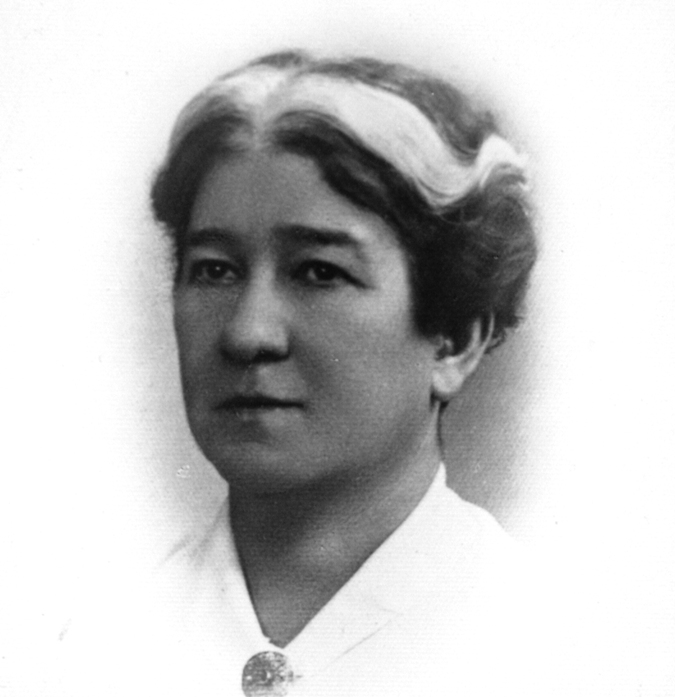
Nathalie Zand of Poland

- Łucja Frey (1889–c.1942), neurologist known for describing the auriculotemporal nerve syndrome, now widely known as "Frey's syndrome"
- Małgorzata Kossut (born 1950), neuroscientist specializing in neuroplasticity and neural mechanisms of learning and memory
- Liliana Lubińska (1904–1990), neuroscientist known for her research on the peripheral nervous system and her discovery of bidirectional axoplasmic transport
- Irena Nalepa (born 1951), neuroscientist, pharmacologist and biochemist
- Nathalie Zand (c.1884–1942), neurologist known for studying the choroid plexus and publishing Les plexus choroïdes: Anatomie, physiologie, pathologie

== Portugal ==
- Megan Carey (fl. 2005), neuroscientist and leader of the Neural Circuits and Behavior Laboratory at the Champalimaud Centre for the Unknown in Lisbon
- Hanna Damasio (fl. from 1960s), neuroscientist using brain imaging methods, such as computerized tomography and nuclear magnetic resonance for investigating brain diseases
- Susana Lima (fl. 2005), researching neural mechanisms of sexual behavior and male choice
- Paula Isabel da Silva Moreira (born 1975), neuroscientist known for discoveries concerning mitochondrial oxidation in Alzheimer's disease

== Romania ==
- Viviana Gradinaru (born 1981), Romanian-American professor of neuroscience at the California Institute of Technology
- Marianne Fillenz (1924–2012), known for investigating the physiology of the autonomic nervous system
- Ruxandra Sireteanu (1945–2008), biophysicist and neuroscientist who researched the human visual system

== Russia ==
- Natalia Bekhtereva (1924–2008), neuroscientist and psychologist known for developing neurophysiological approaches to psychology
- Serafima Bryusova (1894–1958), first female neurosurgeon, studied brain angiography and Circle of Willis
- Svetlana Dambinova (born 1949), neuroscientists known for her research on glutamate receptors
- Angelina Guskova (1924–2015), neurologist, neurosurgeon and radiation protection expert
- Ol'ga Leonova (fl. 1890–1910), embryologist and physician known for work on congenital disorders and the connection between central nervous system damage and eye disease
- Taisiya Sergeevna Osintseva (1923–2008), neurologist interested in chronic feral nidal infections of the nervous system
- Tatiana Rosenthal (1885–1921), psychoanalyst, physician and specialist in neurology
- Olga Vinogradova (1929–2001), cognitive neuroscientist

== Rwanda ==
- Claire Karekezi (born 1982), neurosurgeon at the Rwanda Military Hospital in Kigali

== Serbia ==
- Dragana Rogulja (fl. 2015), neuroscientist and circadian biologist at the Harvard Medical School Blacatnik Institute of Neurobiology

== South Africa ==
- Frances Ames (1920–2002), neurologist, psychiatrist, and human rights activist who studied the effects of cannabis on the brain
- Zena Athene Stein (July 7, 1922 – November 7, 2021), physician, neuroepidemiologist studied child development, psychiatric disorders and birth defects

== South Korea ==
- Gloria Choi (2000s - ), neuroscientist studying maternal immune activation models of autism spectrum disorder

== Spain ==
- Nazareth Castellanos (born 1977), research into meditation and the interaction between the brain and other organs
- Mara Dierssen Sotos (born 1961), research into the neurobiology of Down syndrome at the Centre for Genomic Regulation
- María Domínguez Castellano (born 1965), neuroscientist, director of Developmental Neurobiology at the Institute of Neurosciences, Alicante
- Susana Martinez-Conde (born 1969), neuroscientist and science writer investigating how our brains create perceptual and cognitive illusions
- Carmen Sandi (fl. from late 1980s), research into the neurobiological mechanisms of how stress alters the brain

== Sweden ==
- Annica Dahlström (born 1941), neuroscientist with a research focus on how nerve cells store and transport signals
- Isabelle Dussauge (fl. 2010s), cognitive neuroscientist who co.founded the NeuroGenderings Networl
- Mouna Esmaeilzadeh (born 1980), Iranian-Swedish neuroscientist and entrepreneur known for her longevity clinic using genetic analyses as part of advanced health check-ups on her patients
- Pam Fredman (born 1950), neuroscientist, president of the International Association of Universities
- Ivanka Savic (born 1953), Serbian-Swedish neuroscientist at the Karolinska Institute known for neurophysiology and neuroimaging research

== Switzerland ==
- Silvia Arber (born 1968), neurobiologist investigating the mechanisms involved in the function and assembly of neuronal circuits controlling motor behaviour
- Aude Billard (fl. 1971), physicist and computational neuroscientist creating machine learning algorithms to develop models of machine learning in humans
- Jocelyne Bloch (fl. from 2002), neuroscientist investigating deep brain stimulation and brain repair for movement disorders
- Victoria Chan-Palay (born 1945), Singaporean-born Swiss neuroscientist, founder of the journal Dementia and Geriatric Cognitive Disorders
- Anelis Kaiser (fl. from 2008), neuroscientist exploring the influence of heteronormative notions of sexual orientation
- Melanie Greter (fl. from 2000), neuroimmunologist studying the ontogeny of microglia and border-associated macrophages
- Sophie Schwartz (born 1965), professor at the University of Geneva studying neural mechanisms underpinning experience-dependent changes in the human brain

== Taiwan ==
- Denise Hsien Wu (fl. 2007), professor of neuroscience, chair of the Institute of Cognitive Neuroscience, National Central University

== Trinidad and Tobago ==
- Michelle Antoine (fl. 2020), neuroscientist researching the notion of excitatory-inhibitory balance and its role in autism

== Turkey ==
- Cagla Eroglu (fl. 2010), neuroscientist and associate professor of cell biology and neurobiology at Duke University
- Nilay Yapici (fl 2000s) is a neuroscientist at Cornell University who studies the neural circuits underlying decision making and feeding behavior in fruit fly models to pave the way towards an understanding of how to target and treat obesity and eating disorders in patients

== Uganda ==
- Juliet Sekabunga Nalwanga (fl. 2018), Uganda's first female neurosurgeon

== United Kingdom ==
- Ingrid Allen (1932–2020), known for research into neurodegeneration
- Sarah-Jayne Blakemore (born 1974), research into the perception of causality in the human brain
- Gemma Calvert (fl. from 1990s), researching multisensory brain systems and how the power of the subconscious brain affects marketing
- Helen Cassaday (fl. from 1990s), neuroscientist investigating the underlying biology of associative learning processes
- Nicola Clayton (born 1962), psychologist specializing in comparative cognition
- Stephanie Cragg, neuroscientist, professor at University of Oxford investigating the biology of dopamine transmission in health and Parkinson's disease
- Hannah Critchlow (born 1980), neuroscientist with a research focus on cellular and molecular neuroscience
- Iroise Dumontheil (fl. from 2015), neuroscientist with a research focus on the social cognition and executive functions associated with the rostral prefrontal cortex
- Wendy Ewart (fl. 2000s), responsible for the development of the Medical Research Council's strategic plan
- Elizabeth Fisher (fl. 1980s), professor at University College London investigating degeneration of motor neurons triggered by Down syndrome
- Maria Fitzgerald (born 1953), neuroscientist studying the developmental physiology and neurobiology of nociceptor circuits in the brain and spinal cord
- Sarah Garfinkel (fl. from 2006), neuroscientist studying the link between interoception and the brain
- Sonia Gandhi (fl. 2000s), Francis Crick Institute neurodegeneration laboratory, investigating molecular mechanisms behind Parkinson's disease
- Alison Goate (fl. from 1980s), known for studying the genetics of Alzheimer's disease and related dementias
- Usha Goswami (born 1960), neuroscientist investigating the neural basis of developmental dyslexia, of speech and language impairments, and of rhythmic motor behaviour
- Susan Greenfield, Baroness Greenfield (born 1950), scientist, writer and broadcaster with a research focus on he treatment of Parkinson's and Alzheimer's diseases
- Francesca Happé (born 1967), cognitive neuroscientist investigating autism spectrum conditions
- Julie M. Harris (born 1967), psychologist who studies binocular vision, vision and animal patterning
- Jane Haley (fl. 2012), electrophysiologist, neuroscience scientific coordinator at the University of Edinburgh
- Christine Holt (born 1954), developmental neuroscientist investigating the basic mechanisms of the vertebrate brain
- Heidi Johansen-Berg (born 1974), professor of cognitive neuroscience at the University of Oxford, studying brain plasticity in regard to stroke rehabilitation and ageing
- Eve Johnstone (born 1944), Scottish physician, clinical researcher, psychiatrist and academic investigating schizophrenia and psychotic illness
- Annette Karmiloff-Smith (1938–2016), cognitive neuroscientist known for research into Williams syndrome
- Tara Keck (fl. 2000s), neuroscientist investigating synaptic and homeostatic plasticity in the neocortex
- Diane Lipscombe (born 1960), professor of neuroscience at the Robert J. and Nancy D. Carney Institute for Brain Science, Brown University
- Jennifer S. Lund (born 1940), anatomist focused on he organization of feedforward and feedback circuits in the neocortex
- Giovanna Mallucci (fl. from 2000), neuroscientist specializing in neurodegenerative diseases
- Ruth McKernan (fl. from 1980s), neuroscientist known for her work on ligand-gated ion channels as well as for services to business and innovation
- Katharine Montagu (died 1966), first to identify dopamine in the human brain
- Freda Newcombe (1925–2001), clinical neuropsychologist playing a pivotal role in the development of cognitive neuropsychology
- Esther Odekunle (fl. 2010s), neurobiologist and antibody engineer researching risks from antibodies
- Karalyn Patterson (born 1943), specialist in cognitive neuropsychology
- Marysia Placzek (fl. 2012), professor of developmental neurobiology at the University of Sheffield
- Cathy Price (fl. 1990s), professor of cognitive neuroscience at University College London
- Gina Rippon (born 1950), research involving the application of brain imaging techniques, particularly electroencephalography and magnetoencephalography
- Katya Rubia (fl. from 1994), neuroscientist best known for her work in child cognitive neuroscience and neuropsychiatry
- Barbara Sahakian (fl. 2000s), known for her contributions to psychopharmacology, neuroethics, neuropsychology, neuropsychiatry and neuroimaging
- Sophie Scott (born 1966), neuroscientist investigating the cognitive neuroscience of voices, speech and laughter
- Aditi Shankardass (fl. 2009), clinical work using electroencephalogram recordings of the brain to diagnose developmental disorders in children
- Rebeccah Slater (fl. 2010s), professor of paediatric neuroscience at the University of Oxford
- Maria Grazia Spillantini (fl. from 1980s), neuroscientist noted for identifying the protein alpha-synuclein as the major component of Lewy bodies
- Tara Spires-Jones (born 1976), neuroscientists studying synapse degeneration and resilience in Alzheimer's and other neurodegenerative diseases
- Susan Standring (fl. from 1970s), experimental neurobiologist, writer and researcher
- Karen Steel (fl. from 1990s), geneticist studying the genetics behind deafness, mainly focusing on the genetics of mice
- Sarah Tabrizi (born 1965), British-Iranian neurologist and neuroscientist in the field of neurodegeneration
- Kathleen Taylor (fl. 2000s), neuroscientist with a focus on physiology, psychology and the neuroscience of belief
- Irene Tracey (born 1966), research focused on the neuroscience of pain perception and analgesia
- Anne Treisman (1935–2018), cognitive psychologist researching visual attention, object perception, and memory
- Angela Vincent (born 1942), known for research in the areas of molecular biology, biochemistry, cellular immunology and intracellular neurophysiology
- Elizabeth Warrington (born 1931), neuropsychologist specialised in the study of dementia
- Mary Broadfoot Walker (born 1888), researched physostigmine in the treatment of myasthenia gravis, and potassium in familial periodic paralysis
- Heather Whalley (fl. 2010s), psychiatrist with a research focus on the mechanisms underlying the development of major psychiatric disorders
- Barbara Wilson (born 1941), psychologist, founder of the Oliver Zangwill Centre for Neuropsychological Rehabilitation, Ely, Cambridgeshire
- Emma Yhnell (fl. 2015), neuroscientists with a research focus on Huntington's disease

== United States ==
=== A ===
- Carmela Abraham (fl. 1990s), neuroscientist studying Alzheimer's disease
- Susan Ackerman (fl. 2000s), neuroscientist and geneticist known for investigating genetic and biochemical factors behind the central nervous system
- Elizabeth Adkins-Regan (born 1945), comparative behavioural neuroendocrinologist known for research on the hormonal and neural mechanisms of reproductive behaviour
- Huda Akil (born 1945), Syrian-American neuroscientist focusing on the neurobiology of emotions
- Ream Al-Hasani, British-born American neuroscientist and pharmacologist studying endogenous opioids in addiction, pain, and affective disorders
- Susan Amara (fl. 2000s), neuroscientist focusing on the parts of the brain activated by the effects of addictive drugs
- Julia Tutelman Apter (died 1979), One of the first specialists in neurophysiological research
- Nancy Coover Andreasen (born 1938), neuroscientist and neuropsychiatrist known for developing the concept of negative symptoms in schizophrenia
- Anne M. Andrews (fl. from 1990s), neuroscientist focused on the neurochemistry of the brain's serotonin system
- Amy Arnsten (fl. from 1980s), neuroscientist focused on the molecular mechanisms behind the higher cortical circuits governing cognition
- Lauren Y. Atlas (fl. 2000s), neuroscientist studying pain and psychopharmacology

=== B ===
- Kristin Baldwin (fl. from 1998), neuroscientist focusing on reprogrammed and induced pluripotent stem cells to study the epigenetic changes of the genome and brain
- Tracy Bale (born 1969), neuroscientist and molecular biologist focusing on parental prenatal stress and its effect on offspring
- Cornelia Bargmann (born 1962), neurobiologist known for her work on the genetic and neural circuit mechanisms of behavior using C. elegans
- Carol A. Barnes (fl. 2000s), neuroscientist focusing on the neurophysiological and behavioral changes that occur in the brain during ageing
- Lisa Feldman Barrett (born c. 1963), psychologist and neuroscientist studying emotion, known for How Emotions are Made: The Secret Life of the Brain
- Susan R. Barry (fl. from 1981), neurobiologist and physician known for her Fixing My Gaze: A Scientist's Journey into Seeing in Three Dimensions
- Jessica Barson (fl. 2010s), neuroscientist investigating neuropeptide signalling in the paraventricular nucleus of the thalamus
- Danielle Bassett (born 1981), physicist and systems neuroscientist applying network science to the study of learning in the human brain
- Amy Bastian (born 1968), neuroscientist contributing to the neuroscience of sensorimotor control
- Diana Bautista (fl. 2000s), neuroscientist known for her work on the molecular mechanisms underlying itch, touch and pain
- Elaine Bearer (fl. from 1990s), neuroscientist, pathologist and composer, recent research on magnetic resonance imaging of neural connections and brain activity in transgenic mouse models of human disorders
- Marlene Behrmann (born 1959), psychologist specializing in the cognitive neuroscience of visual perception
- Ursula Bellugi (born 1931), German-American neuroscientist researching the biological bases of language
- April A. Benasich (fl. from 1980s), neuroscientist known for research on the early neural processes necessary for normal cognitive and language development
- Joanne Berger-Sweeney (fl. from 1990s), neuroscientist researching the neurobiology of learning and memory, with applications to neurodevelopmental disorders
- Heather A. Berlin (fl. 2000s) neuroscientist noted for her work in science communication and outreach
- Mayim Bialik (born 1975), actress, author and neuroscientist
- Staci Bilbo (fl. 2000s), neuroimmunologist and professor of psychology and neuroscience at Duke University
- Sherilynn Black (fl. 2010s), neuroscientist at Duke University researching social neuroscience
- Eliza Bliss-Moreau (fl. from 2008), neuroscientist focusing on the biology of emotions in humans and animals
- Brenda Bloodgood (fl. from 2000s), neuroscientist studying synaptic plasticity
- Jill Bolte Taylor (born 1959), neuroanatomist, author, and inspirational public speaker, known for studying severe mental illnesses and her My Stroke of Insight, A Brain Scientist's Personal Journey
- Susan Y. Bookheimer (fl. 2010s), neuroscientist known for her work developing brain imaging techniques to help patients with Alzheimer's and related disease
- Nancy Bonini (born 1959), neuroscientist and geneticist, known for pioneering the use of Drosophila to study neurodegeneration of the human brain
- Lisa Boulanger (born 1990), research at Princeton University on immune proteins in the formation and function of neuronal connectivity
- Laura S. Boylan (born 1961), psychiatric manifestations of neurologic disease
- Mary Brazier (1904–1995), British-born American neuroscientist known for her fundamental contributions to the study of EEG changes in anesthesia
- Louann Brizendine (born 1952), neuroscientist researching women's moods and hormones
- Katja Brose (fl. 2000s), neuroscientist known for identifying the receptor Robo and its ligand Slit as a new family of axon guidance molecule
- Linda B. Buck (born 1947), Nobel laureate, best known for her work on the olfactory system
- Elizabeth A. Buffalo (fl. 2010s), research into neurophysiology and the role of the hippocampus and medial temporal lobe structures in learning and memory
- Mary Bartlett Bunge (born 1941), neuroscientist researching a cure for paralysis

=== C ===
- Denise Cai (fl. 2010), researching memory formation at the Icahn School of Medicine at Mount Sinai
- Patricia Carpenter (fl. 2000s), neuroscientist focusing on the organization of the cognitive systems in immediate thought
- Mary Carskadon (fl. 1990s), investigating sleep disorders
- C. Sue Carter (fl. from 1990s), biologist and behavioral neurobiologist specializing in behavioral neuroendocrinology
- Vivien Casagrande (1942–2017), neuroscientist known for her research on understanding how the visual thalamus and cortex interact to construct our perceptual world
- Constance Cepko (fl. from 1982), neuroscientist researching retroviral vectors in studying the development of the retina
- Gloria Choi (fl. 2014), neuroscientist at the Picower Institute for Leaning and Memory at MIT, researching the role of the immune system in autism spectrum disorder-like phenotypes
- Anne Churchland (fl. 2000s), neuroscientist studying the function of the posterior parietal cortex in cognitive processes
- Patricia Churchland (born 1943), Canadian-American philosopher focusing on the interface between neuroscience and philosophy
- Uraina Clark (fl. 2008), neuroscientist, Icahn School of Medicine at Mount Sinai, researching functional magnetic resonance imaging to understand how stressors impact brain and behavior
- Martha Constantine-Paton (fl. 2000s), neuroscientist focusing on synaptic plasticity and brain development, particularly visual development
- Suzanne Corkin (1937–2016), neuroscientist best known for her research on human memory, which she studied in patients with Alzheimer's disease, Parkinson's disease, and amnesia
- Seana Coulson (fl. 2000s), cognitive scientist researching the neurobiology of language
- Jacqueline Crawley (fl. from 1970s), neuroscientist known for developing tests including the three-compartment test to evaluate mouse social behaviour
- Molly J. Crockett (fl. 2010s), neuroscientist studying the role of neurotransmitters on decision-making
- Elizabeth C. Crosby (1888–1983), neuroanatomist known for her outstanding contributions to comparative and human neuroanatomy
- Meaghan Creed (2000s), neuroscientists known for pioneering research into understanding and applying deep brain stimulation to treat brain related diseases
- Jessica Cardin (2000s), neuroscientist studying local circuits within the primary visual cortex to understand how cellular and synaptic interactions flexibly adapt to different behavioral states and contexts to give rise to visual perceptions and drive motivated behaviors.
- Merit Cudkowicz (2000s), is a Neurologist, Neuroscientist, and leading world expert in the study of amyotrophic lateral sclerosis (ALS).

=== D ===
- Mary Fenner Dallman (1935–2021), neuroendocrinologist known for elucidating function along the hypothalamic, pituitary, adrenal axis
- Hanna Damasio (fl. from 1970s), neuroscientist known for using brain imaging methods, such as computerized tomography and nuclear magnetic resonance for diagnosing brain diseases
- Muriel Davisson (fl. from 1970s), geneticist known for developing the Down syndrome mouse model Ts65Dn
- Valina L. Dawson (born 1961), neuroscientist researching the molecular mechanisms that lead to neuronal cell death in neurodegenerative diseases
- Lindsay M. De Biase (fl 2000s), explores the diversity of microglia that exist within the basal ganglia circuitry to one day target regional or circuit-specific microglia in disease
- Christine Ann Denny (fl. 2010s), neuroscientist investigating the molecular mechanisms underlying learning and memory
- Adele Diamond (born 1952), co-founded the field of developmental cognitive neuroscience
- Marian Diamond (1926–2017), pioneering scientist and educator considered to be one of the founders of modern neuroscience
- Zoe R. Donaldson (fl 2000s), American neuroscientist exploring the neurobiological and genetic mechanisms of social bonding and social behavior in rodents
- Dena Dubal (fl. 2011), research showing that the hormone Klotho can enhance cognition and diminish neurodegenerative decline
- Catherine Dulac, French-American neuroscientist researching the molecular biology of olfactory signaling in mammels
- Susan Durham (fl. 2010s), neurosurgeon, professor at the University of Southern California Keck School of Medicine
- Susan Dymecki (born 1960), geneticist and neuroscientist at Harvard's Dymecki Lab

=== E ===
- Emmeline Edwards (fl. 2000s), neurochemist researching neural mechanisms of complex behaviors
- Gillian Einstein (born 1952), neuroscientist focusing on the anatomy of the female brain
- Judith S. Eisen (born 1951), American neuroscientist and professor of biology at the University of Oregon who helped establish zebrafish as a model in which to study vertebrate nervous system development. Eisen conducts fundamental research in the specification and patterning of the vertebrate nervous system with a focus on developmental interactions between the nervous system, immune system, and host-associated microbiota
- Lise Eliot (fl. 2000s), neuroscientist known for her book on gender differences, Pink Brain, Blue Brain: How Small Differences Grow into Troublesome Gaps and What We Can Do About It
- Karen Emmorey (fl. 2010s), linguist and cognitive neuroscientist investigating the neuroscience of sign language
- Alev Erisir (fl. 2000s), Turkish-American neuroscientist researching synaptic connectivity in the visual and taste systems

=== F ===
- Emily Falk (fl. from 2010), American communication neuroscientist studying behavior change and the spread of ideas, with a focus on linking neural activity to individual, group, and population behavior
- Evelina Fedorenko (born 1980), Russian-American cognitive neuroscientist
- Eva Feldman (fl. from 1979), neurologist contributing to various areas of research including the diagnosis of diabetic neuropathy and the application of stem cell therapy for treating human diseases such as Alzheimer's
- Marla Feller (fl. 1990s), professor of biological sciences studying mechanisms underpinning the assembly of neural circuits
- Ila Fiete (fl. 2000s), Indian-American computational neuroscientist
- Susan Fiske (born 1952), psychologist and neuroscientist known for work on social cognition at Princeton University
- Shelly Flagel (fl. 2000s), behavioral neuroscientist studying the individual differences in addiction and impulse control disorders, reward learning, and motivated behaviour neurobiology
- Alice Weaver Flaherty (fl. 2000s), neurologist researching how human brains represent their bodies in relation to depression, Parkinson's, and somatoform disorders

=== G ===
- Joyonna Gamble-George (fl. 2014), neuroscientist, innovator and entrepreneur, researching the endocannabinoid system in stress-induced maladaptations of the brain
- Michela Gallagher (fl. 2008), cognitive psychologist and neuroscientist at Johns Hopkins University
- Sandra M. Garraway, is an American neuroscientist who studies the neural mechanisms of spinal nociceptive pain after spinal cord injury
- Kathleen Gates (fl. 2000s) neuroscientist and quantitative psychologist developing statistical methods for the analysis of intensive longitudinal data
- Lisa Genova (born 1970), neuroscientist and writer known for her novel Still Alive about a professor with Alzheimer's disease
- Morton Ann Gernsbacher (fl. from 1980s), neuroscientist specializing in autism and psycholinguistics
- Erin M. Gibson, is a glial and circadian biologist studying the molecular mechanisms by which the circadian rhythm modulates glial biology
- Lisa Giocomo (fl. 2012), neuroscientist investigating molecular and cellular mechanisms underlying cortical neural circuits
- Erica Glasper (fl. 2005), behavioral neuroscientist with a laboratory at the University of Maryland
- Patricia Goldman-Rakic (1937–2003), first to discover and describe the circuitry of the prefrontal cortex and its relationship to working memory
- Miriam B. Goodman (fl. 2000s), neuroscientist working to develop of mechanistic model of sensation in C. elegans
- Lisa Goodrich (born 1969), neurobiologist specializing in the cellular and molecular mechanisms behind the development of neural circuits
- Elizabeth Gould (born 1962), neuroscientist focusing on adult neurogenesis in the hippocampus
- Patricia A. Grady (fl. from 1990s), neuroscientist known for her books on hypertension, cerebrovascular permeability, vascular stress, and cerebral edema
- Michelle Gray, is a leading neurobiologist in the study of the biological basis of Huntington's disease (HD), with a focus on neuron-glia interactions in HD
- Ann Graybiel (born 1942), neuroscientist specializing on the basal ganglia and the neurophysiology of habit formation
- Carla Green (born 1962), neurobiologist and chronobiologist studying studies the molecular mechanism of circadian rhythms in mammals
- Sue T. Griffin (born 1934), neuroscientist known for investigating the role of neuroinflammation in the pathogenesis of Alzheimer's disease
- Theanne Griffith (fl. 2011), neuroscientist studying mammalian thermosensation
- Kalanit Grill-Spector (fl. 2000s) neuroscientist studying the structure and function of the human visual system with MRI
- Chenghua Gu (fl. 2007), professor, Harvard Medical School, researching the blood-brain barrier
- Lisa Gunaydin, neuroscientist who helped discover and specializes in optogenetic technology

=== H ===
- Melina Hale (fl. from 1998), neuroscientist studying zebrafish to understand how the brain communicates with muscles to generate movement
- Marnie Halpern (born 1956), molecular and systems biologist who has focused on studying how differences are established between the right and left sides of the developing brain
- Michelle Hampson (fl. 2010), associate professor of radiology and biomedical imaging at Yala University
- Kristen Harris (born 1954), neuroscientist studying the structure and function of synapses using 3D-electron microscopy
- Mary Hatten (fl. from 1975), neuroscientist researching how neurons migrate in the brain
- Kiralee Hayashi actress, stuntwoman, gymnast and scientist who co-authored Brain surface parameterization using Riemann surface structure
- Dena G. Hernandez (fl. 2016), neurogeneticist, head of genomic technologies at the National Institute on Aging
- Rachel Sarah Herz (fl. from 1990s), psychologist and a cognitive neuroscientist known as an expert on the psychology of smell
- Melissa Hines (fl. 2000s), neuroscientist studying the development of gender and how the interaction of prenatal and postnatal experience shapes brain development and behaviour
- Susan Hockfield (born 1951), neuroscientist known for pioneering the use of monoclonal antibody technology in brain research
- Julianne Holt-Lunstad (fl. 2010s), psychologist and neuroscientist focusing on the long-term health effects of social connections and loneliness
- Elaine Hsiao, American biologist who investigates how “peripheral” changes in the immune system and resident microbiota impact the nervous system
- Yasmin Hurd (fl. 2000s), neuroscientist studying addiction in people and animal models including changes caused by cannabis

=== J ===
- Lisa James (fl. 2009), clinical psychologist and neuroscientist at the University of Minnesota Medical School
- Dorothea Jameson (1920–1998), cognitive psychologist known for her contribution to the field of colour and vision
- Lily Jan (born 1947), Chinese-American neuroscientist known for breakthroughs in neurogenesis and cell fate specification and for studying ion channels
- Patricia Janak (born 1965), psychologist and neuroscientist contributing to the biological basis of behaviour in the context of associative learning
- Charlene Drew Jarvis (born 1941), scientific researcher and politician
- Amishi Jha (fl. from 1998), psychologist and neuroscientist showing how mindfulness training improves numerous aspects of both cognitive and emotional health
- Yishi Jin (fl. 2003), Chinese-American neurobiologist, professor at the Howard Hughes Medical Institute
- Crystal C. Watkins Johansson (fl. 2000), neuroscientist and psychiatrist at the Johns Hopkins University School of Medicine
- Elizabeth Jonas (fl. 2013), professor of endocrinology and neuroscience at the Yale School of Medicine
- Lataisia Jones (fl. 2016), neuroscientist studying neurological disorders through molecular and systems biology
- Theresa A. Jones (born 1964), neuroscientist focusing on neural plasticity across the lifespan synaptic connectivity in adult animals following brain damage during skill learning

=== K ===
- Nancy Kanwisher (born 1958), cognitive neuroscientist known for discovering the fusiform face area and the parahippocampal place area
- Leslie M. Kay (fl. 1999), neuroscientist at the University of Chicago studying the neurophysiology of the olfactory bulb
- Tara Keck (born 1978), professor of neuroscience at University College London
- JacSue Kehoe (born 1935), neuroscientist studying the neurons of Aplysia californica and the post-synaptic nerve response
- Ann E. Kelley (1954–2007), neuroscientist specialized in the neuroscience of reward and behavior
- Darcy Kelley (born 1948), neurobiologist contributing to neuroethology
- Mary B. Kennedy (born 1947), biochemist and neuroscientist focusing on the molecular mechanisms of synaptic plasticity
- Catherine Kerr (fl. 2000s), neuroscientist investigating the effects of body-based attention practices such as Tai Chi and mindfulness on the brain and nervous system
- Kristen Knutson (fl. 2000s), neurologist known for research into the mortality rates of evening and morning types
- Nancy Kopell (born 1942), mathematician known from applying mathematical models to analyze the physiological mechanisms of brain dynamics
- Nina Kraus (fl. 2000s), neuroscientist investigating the neural encoding of speech and music and its plasticity
- Mary Jeanne Kreek (1937–2021), neurobiologist specializing in the study and treatment of addiction
- Leah Krubitzer (fl. from 1980s), neuroscientist investigating how complex brains in mammals evolve from simpler forms
- Patricia K. Kuhl (fl. from 1970s), neuroscientist investigating early language and brain development and how young children learn
- Marta Kutas (born 1949) cognitive neuroscientist known for discovering the N400, an event-related potential component typically elicited by unexpected linguistic stimuli

=== L ===
- Adrienne C. Lahti (fl. 1995), Belgian-American neuroscientist at the University of Alabama at Birmingham
- Story Landis (fl. from 1970) neurobiologist and former director of the National Institute of Neurological Disorders and Stroke at the National Institutes of Health
- Lynn T. Landmesser (born 1943), biological scientist known for developmental neuroscience research, particularly relating to the spinal cord and the formation of spinal motor circuits
- Maria Lehtinen (fl. 2000s), neuroscientist at the Harvard Medical School
- Rachel N. Levin (fl. 2000s), neurobiologist at Pomona College who studies animal sexual behavior
- Jerre Levy (born 1938), psychologist and neuroscientist studying the relationship between the cerebral hemispheres and visual-oriented versus language-oriented tasks
- Linda Liau (fl. 2007), neurosurgeon and neuroscientist at the Daviid Geffen School of Medicine at UCLA
- Christiane Linster (born 1962), Luxembourg-American behavioural neuroscientist known for research into neuromodulation relating to learning and memory
- Judy Liu (fl. 2000s), neuroscientist working on cortical malformations causing epilepsy
- Margaret Livingstone (born 1950), neurobiologist known for her book Vision and Art: The Biology of Seeing
- Jeanne Loring (born 1950), development neurobiologist and geneticist studying several fields including the genomics and epigenetics of pluripotent stem cells
- Victoria Luine (fl. 2000s), psychologist, neurochemist and writer
- Beatriz Luna (fl. 1999), developmental neuroscientist conducting neuroimaging research on the development of cognitive control

=== M ===
- Misha Mahowald (1963–1996), computational neuroscientist working in the field of neuromorphic engineering
- Gail Mandel, senior scientist at the Vollum Institute and a professor in the Department of Biochemistry and Molecular Biology in the School of Medicine at Oregon Health & Science University(OSHU), her research is focused on understanding how neuronal cell identity is established and maintained
- Eve Marder (fl. from 1970s), experimental and computational neuroscientist known for her work on neural circuits in the crustacean stomatogastric nervous system
- Bianca Jones Marlin (fl. 2015), neuroscientist researching the epigenetic mechanisms that enable trauma experienced by parents to be passed on to rodent offspring
- Abigail Marsh (born 1976), psychologist and neuroscientist, Georgetown University, director of the Laboratory on Social and Affective Neuroscience
- Deborah Mash (born 1952), neurologist interested in the addiction-stopping capabilities of ibogaine
- Mara Mather (fl. 2000s), psychologist researching ageing with a focus on the effect of emotion and stress on memory
- Helen S. Mayberg (born 1956), neurologist known for delineating abnormal brain function in patients with major depression using functional neuroimaging
- Margaret McCarthy (born 1958), neuroscientist and pharmacologist researching the neuroscience of sex differences
- Susan McConnell (fl. from late 1980s), neurobiologist studying the development of neural circuits in the mammalian cerebral cortex
- Louise McCullough (fl. 2000s), neurologist engaged in stroke research
- Ann McKee (born 1953), neuropathologist and expert in neurodegenerative disease
- Edith Graef McGeer (1923–2023), neuroscientist known for studying the prevention and treatment of Alzheimer's and other neurodegenerative diseases
- BethAnn McLaughlin (born 1968), neurologist researching neural stress responses and brain injury
- Sara Mednick (fl. 2000s), psychologist researching the relationship between napping and performance
- Kristina Micheva (fl. 2010s), Bulgarian-American neuroscientist at Stanford University
- Vivienne Ming (fl. 2000s), theoretical neuroscientist and Artificial Intelligence expert
- Nancy Minshew (fl. 2000s), psychiatrist and neurologist known for work on the cognitive, neurological, and genetic bases of autism
- Cecilia Moens, faculty member at the Fred Hutchinson Cancer Research Center in Seattle, Washington. She uses zebrafish to study vertebrate brain development
- Michelle Monje (fl. 2000s), neurologist investigating the molecular mechanisms for neurodevelopment and neuroplasticity
- Lisa Monteggia (fl. 2000s), neuroscientists investigating molecular mechanisms underlying neurotrophin interactions with antidepressants
- Bita Moghaddam (fl, 2000s), Iranian-American neuroscientist investigating the neuronal processes underlying emotion and cognition as a first step to designing strategies to treat and prevent brain illnesses
- Lisa Mosconi, Italian American neuroscientist looking at the connections between perimenopause and Alzheimer's disease
- Cynthia F. Moss, American neuroscientist, who exploits specializations of echolocating bats to probe the neural underpinnings of auditory processing, sensorimotor integration, spatial perception, attention, memory and action planning.

=== N ===
- Elly Nedivi (fl. 1990s), neuroscientist known for investigating the molecular mechanisms of neuroplasticity
- Mary Lawson Neff (1862–1945), neurologist remembered for investigating the effects of fatigue on mental and emotional health
- Helen Neville (1946–2018), neuroscientist known for investigating human brain development, including neuroplasticity and neurolinguistics
- Sharlene Newman, cognitive neuroscientists known for her work in neuroimaging, using magnetic resonance imaging techniques to study complex brain function
- Sheila Nirenberg (fl. 2010s) neuroscientist working on neural coding and the development of prosthetic devices able to communicate directly with the brain
- Kimberly Noble (fl. 2011), neuroscientist and pediatrician researching socioeconomic disparities and children's cognitive development

=== O ===
- Loraine Obler (fl. 2010s), neuroscientist
- Kathie L. Olsen (fl. 2000s), neuroscientist noted for her work in scientific policy
- Lauren Orefice (fl. 2016), neuroscientist studying the role of peripheral nerves and sensory hypersensitivity in Autism-like behaviors

=== P ===
- Sarah Pallas (fl. 2005), neuroscientist known for cross-model plasticity and map compression studies in the visual and auditory cortical pathways
- Audrey S. Penn (born 1934), neurologist known for research in the biochemistry of muscle weakness in myasthenia gravis
- Susan Perlman (born c.1949), neurologist and neurogeneticist investigating Friedreich's ataxia
- Candace Pert (1946–2013), neuroscientist and pharmacologist known for discovering the opiate receptor, the cellular binding site for endorphins in the brain
- Laura-Ann Petitto (born c. 1954), cognitive neuroscientist known for her neurolinguistics research, including work on the language capacity of chimpanzees
- Marina Picciotto (born 1963), neuroscientist known for her work on the role of nicotine in addiction, memory, and reward behaviours
- Nicole Prause (fl. 2000s), neuroscientist researching human sexual behaviour, addiction, and the physiology of sexual response
- Caroline Palavicino-Maggio (fl 2000s) neuroscientist exploring how gene expression in amine neurons and neural circuits leads to changes in social behavior, specifically aggression, in Drosophila
- Gina Poe (fl 2000s) neuroscientist studying sleep and how neural activity during REM sleep is crucial to memory and learning
- Nicole Prause (born 1978), neursoscientist researching human sexual behavior

=== Q ===
- Elizabeth Quinlan (fl. 2001), professor at the University of Maryland studying how the plasticity of juvenile and adult mammalian visual systems differ

=== R ===
- Rosa Rademakers (fl. 2016), neuroscientist researching the genetic basis of neurodegenerative diseases
- Kanaka Rajan (fl. 2000s), neuroscientist researching how the brain processes sensory information
- Priya Rajasethupathy (fl. 2000e), neuroscientist researching memory development over time by observing and manipulating neural circuitry.
- Isabelle Rapin (1927–2017), Swiss-American neurologist and paediatrician remembered for her contributions to the understanding of autism and language disorders.
- Judith L. Rapoport (fl. from 1960s), psychiatrist known for studying the clinical phenomenology, neurobiology, and treatment of Childhood Onset Schizophrenia.
- Brenda Rapp neuroscientist and editor of Cognitive Neuropsychology, known for research into written word production and dysgraphia.
- Linda Restifo (fl. from 1980s), neuroscientist studying the changes in brain development leading to cognitive disorders.
- Barbara Rothbaum (fl. from 1990s), psychologist and pioneer in the treatment of anxiety-related disorders.
- Vanessa Ruta (fl. 2000s), neuroscientist known for investigating chemosensory circuits behind innate and learned behaviours in the fly Drosophila melanogaster.
- Carolyn I. Rodriguez (fl 2000s), neuroscientist and psychiatrist developing rapid therapies for OCD and hoarding disorder.

=== S ===
- Eleanor Saffran (1939–2002), neuroscientist known as a researcher in the field of cognitive neuropsychology
- Miriam Salpeter (1929–2000), professor of neurobiology at Cornell University
- Cara Santa Maria (born 1983), science communicator and psychologist
- Rebecca Saxe (fl. 2000s), cognitive neuroscientist working on theory of mind, the plasticity of the cortex and the neural substrates of empathy, and emotion attribution
- Daniela Schiller (born 1972), neuroscientist heading the Affective Neuroscience Lab at the Mount Sinai School of Medicine
- Amita Sehgal (fl. from 1990s), cell and molecular neuroscientist working on circadian rhythms and sleep
- Dorothy P. Schafer (fl. 2000s), neurobiologist focusing on the role of microglia in the development of synapses and brain circuits
- Erin Schuman (born 1963), neurobiologist studying neuronal synapses, director of the Max Planck Institute for Brain Research
- Nicole Schupf (fl. 2000s), epidemiologist and neuroscientist, professor at the Gertrude H. Sergievsky Center, Columbia University Faculty of Medicine
- Carla J. Shatz (born 1947), one of the pioneers who determined some of the basic principles of early brain development
- Anne Schaefer (fl 2000), neuroscientist and neuroimmunologist who investigates the epigenetic mechanisms of cellular plasticity and their role in the regulation of microglia-neuron interactions
- Erin M. Schuman (born 1963), neurobiologist studying neuronal synapses
- Rosalind A. Segal (born 1958), neurobiologist studying the how disruption of the mammalian brain leads to the formation of brain malignancies
- Maryam Shanechi (born 1981), Iranian-American neuroengineer, studying decoding of the brain's activity to control brain-machine interfaces
- Carla J. Shatz (born 1947), early female neurobiologist who determined some of the basic principles of brain development
- Pamela Sklar (1959–2017), psychiatrist and neuroscientist known for large-scale gene discovery studies in bipolar disorder and schizophrenia
- Esther Somerfeld-Ziskind (1901–2002), neurologist and psychiatrist known for pioneering research into the use of insulin, lithium, and electroconvulsive therapy for treating psychiatric disorders
- Tara Spires-Jones (fl. 2000s), neuroscientist focusing on the degeneration of synapse connections between neuronal braincells in Alzheimer's disease
- Beth Stevens (born 1970), neuroscientist known for work on the role of microglia and complement proteins in the removal of synaptic cells during brain development
- Lisa Stowers (fl. 2004), neuroscientist at Scripps Research studying pheromone signaling and response
- Carsen Stringer (fl 2000), computational neuroscientist and Group Leader at the Howard Hughes Medical Institute Janelia Research Campus. Stringer uses machine learning and deep neural networks to visualize large scale neural recordings and then probe the neural computations that give rise to visual processing in mice
- Wendy Suzuki (fl. from 1990s), neuroscientist researching neuroplasticity and how the brain is able to change and adapt over the course of a person's life
- Susan Swedo neuroscientist conducting research on the causes and treatment of pediatric neuropsychiatric disorders

=== T ===
- Viviane Tabar (fl. 2000s), neurosurgeon researching stem cell biology and strategies for cell-based therapies for the repair of radiation-induced brain injury
- Paula Tallal (born 1947), neuroscientist researching dyslexia and other word encoding disorders
- Carol Tamminga (fl. 2000s), psychiatrist and neuroscientist focusing on treating psychotic illnesses, such as schizophrenia, psychotic bipolar disorder, and schizoaffective disorder
- Jill Bolte Taylor (born 1959), neuroanatomist who wrote My Stroke of Insight
- Sally Temple (fl. 2000s), neuroscientist focusing on neural stem cells and therapies related to eye, brain, and spinal cord disorders
- Sujata Tewari (1938–2000), Indian-American neuroscientist known for her work demonstrating that chronic alcohol consumption inhibits protein metabolism in the brains of mice
- Jean H. Thurston (1917–2017), neurologist known for her research on seizure disorders
- Doris Tsao (fl. 2000s), systems neuroscientist known for pioneering fMRI with single-unit electrophysiological recordings and for discovering the macaque face patch system for face perception
- Gina G. Turrigiano (fl. from 1990s), neuroscientist researching cortical networks and stromograstic network function
- Kay Tye (born c. 1981), neuroscientist focusing on optogenetics for identifying connections in the brain involved in innate emotion, motivation and social behaviours
- Malú G. Tansey is a neuroscientist investigating the role of neuroimmune interactions in the development and progression of neurodegenerative and neuropsychiatric disease.

=== U ===
- Lucina Uddin (fl. from 2000s), cognitive neuroscientist researching the relationship between brain connectivity and cognition in typical and atypical development using network neuroscience approaches.
- Leslie Ungerleider (born 1946), experimental psychologist and neuroscientist known for introducing the concepts of the dorsal and ventral streams

=== V ===
- Ashley Van Zeeland (born 1982), neuroscientist focusing on genomics, genetics, and biotechnology in the fields of autism and anorexia nervosa
- Joan Venes (1935–2010) neurosurgeon known for helping to develop the practice of neurosurgery in children
- Nora Volkow (born 1956), Mexican-American psychiatrist and neuroscientist conducting imaging studies of the brains of people addicted to drugs
- Leslie B. Vosshall (born 1965), neurobiologist known for contributions to olfaction, particularly the discovery and characterization of the insect olfactory receptor family

=== W ===
- Joni Wallis (fl. from 1990s), neurophysiologist investigating how the frontal cortex of the brain is functionally organized to help people set and attain goals at the level of single neurons
- Judith R. Walters (fl. 2000s), neuropharmacologist at the National Institute of Neurological Disorders and Stroke
- Jade Wang (born 1983), computer programmer and neuroscientist known as co-founder of the open source project Sandstorm
- Kate Wassum (fl. 2000s), neuroscientist and professor of behavioral neuroscience at the University of California, Los Angeles
- Nicole Weekes (fl. 2001), psychologist and neuroscientist studying the psychological and biological response to stress
- Rachel Whitmer, Professor at the University of California Davis, epidemiologist whose research centers on the differing effects of dementia upon racial groups and age cohorts
- Stephanie A. White (fl. 2000s), neuroscientist studying how social interactions impact the brain
- Heather Williams (born 1955), ornithologist known for her book Behavioral neurobiology of birdsong
- Rachel Wilson (fl. 2000s), neurobiologist working in the fields of electrophysiology, neuropharmacology, molecular genetics and functional anatomy
- Shari Wiseman (fl. 2017), neuroscientist, editor-in-chief of Nature Neuroscience
- Ilana B. Witten (fl. 2000s) studies the midbrain dopaminergic reward circuitry, with a focus on the striatal neural circuit mechanisms driving reward learning and decision making
- Marina Wolf (fl. 1998), neuroscientist studying the role of neuronal pasticity in drug addiction
- Rachel Wong, professor at University of Washington interested in neural circuit assembly in development, circuit disassembly in degeneration and circuit reassembly upon cellular regeneration whose current studies are based on the vertebrate retina of mice, human and non-human primates
- Teresa Wood (fl. 2019), neuroscientist, Fellow of the American Association for the Advancement of Science
- Catherine Woolley (born 1965), neuroendocrinologist studying cellular and molecular neuroscience in relation to the brain and behaviour
- Sarah M. N. Woolley (fl. 2000s), neuroscientist studying the neuroscience of communication, using songbirds to understand how the brain learns and understands vocal communication

=== Y ===
- Anne B. Young (fl. from 1970s) physician and neuroscientist working on neurodegenerative diseases, including Huntington's disease and Parkinson's disease
- Deborah Yurgelun-Todd (fl. 2017), neuropsychologist, director of the University of Utah's Neuroscience Initiative

=== Z ===
- Phyllis Zee (fl. 2000s), neurologist researching basic and translational sleep and circadian rhythm
- Hongkui Zeng (fl. 2006), director of the Allen Institute for Brain Science, Seattle
- Huda Zoghbi (born 1954), Lebanese-born American geneticist currently studying MECP2 and discovering that overexpressing the protein in mice led to an autism-like neurological disorder
- Suzanne Zukin (fl. 2009), neuroscientist, studying glutamate receptors

== Venezuela ==
- Gladys Maestre (fl. 2000), neuroscientist, University of Texas, known for work on Alzheimer's disease and dementia
