= Restifo =

Restifo is a surname. Notable people with the surname include:

- Julie Restifo, (born 1958), Venezuelan actress
- Linda Restifo, neuroscientist
- Nicholas P. Restifo (born 1960), American immunologist
