= Luine =

Luine may refer to:

- Leyny, County Sligo, Ireland, a barony (Luíne in Irish)
- Victoria Luine, professor in the Department of Psychology, City University of New York
