= Jane Haley =

British electrophysiologist

- Education: University College London
- Awards: MBE British Neuroscience Association Award for the Public Understanding of Neuroscience Principal's Medal for Outstanding Service, University of Edinburgh
- Scientific career
- Fields: Electrophysiology Neuroscience
- Workplaces: Edinburgh Neuroscience, University of Edinburgh University of Edinburgh Department of Pharmacology, University College London University of Minnesota Stanford University

Jane E. Haley is a British electrophysiologist who is director of research at the motor neuron disease charity MND Scotland. Between 2006 and 2021 she was the Edinburgh Neuroscience Scientific Coordinator at the University of Edinburgh. It was for this role in public engagement and collaboration that Haley was appointed MBE in the 2019 Queen's Birthday Honours List recognising her contribution to science engagement and education.

== Education ==
Haley studied Pharmacology BSc (Hons) at University College London (UCL). She graduated in 1987 at the Royal Albert Hall, where Princess Anne presided over the graduation ceremony.

Haley studied her PhD, also in Pharmacology at UCL between 1987 and 1991.

== Career ==
Haley's research involved understanding chronic pain and how memories are formed by measuring the electrical activity of nerve cells. She held a post-doctoral fellowship at the University of Minnesota and Stanford University from 1991 to 1994. Haley was a post-doctoral researcher in the Department of Pharmacology at University College London from 1994 to 1999 and then at the University of Edinburgh from 2001 to 2007.

Between 2006 and 2021, Haley was the Scientific Coordinator for Edinburgh Neuroscience at University of Edinburgh. It was for work in this role that she was made an MBE in the Queen’s Birthday Honours in 2019. In 2021 she moved to her current role as director of research at the motor neuron disease charity MND Scotland.

Haley has held a number of other roles, including as local group representative for the British Neuroscience Association (BNA) from 2009 until 2021 and as a member of the ASCUS Lab Advisory Board.

Haley has also held the role of Communication Committee Member for the Federation of European Neuroscience Societies (FENS) from 2016 to 2018. She was also a member of the Society for Neuroscience Neuroscience Training Committee from 2019 until 2022.

== Honours and awards ==
In 2012, Haley was awarded the Principal's Medal for Outstanding Service by the Principal at the University of Edinburgh.

In 2013, Haley was awarded the Award for Public Understanding of Neuroscience by the British Neuroscience Association (BNA). She was presented with this award at the BNA Christmas Symposium in London in December 2013.

In 2019, Haley was included in the Queen's Birthday Honours List to receive a Member of the Order of the British Empire (MBE). She was presented with the MBE at Buckingham Palace in January 2020 by Her Royal Highness The Princess Royal.
