= Sarah Pallas =

American neuroscientist

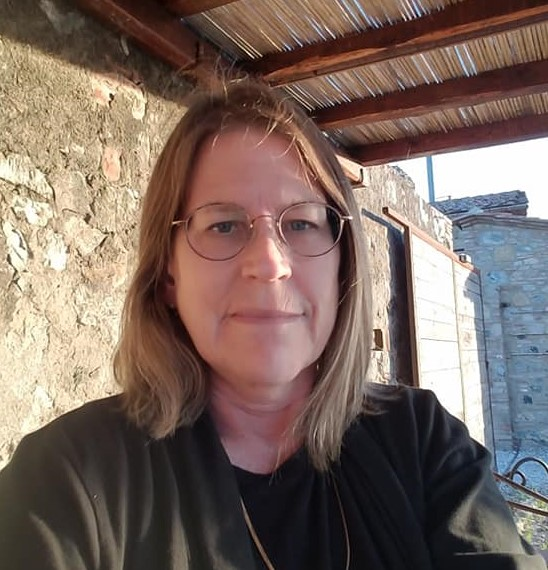
Sarah Pallas

Sarah L. Pallas is an American neuroscientist and a professor of biology at the University of Massachusetts Amherst. She is a fellow of the American Association for the Advancement of Sciences (AAAS) known for her cross-modal plasticity work and map compression studies in the visual and auditory cortical pathways.

== Background and education ==
Sarah Pallas was born in Minnesota. Pallas completed her undergraduate education at the University of Minnesota and graduated with a B.S. in biology. From there, she attended Iowa State University to obtain a master's degree in zoology. For her Ph.D. she studied developmental plasticity in Ronald R. Hoy's and in Barbara L. Finlay's lab at Cornell University. Pallas completed her postdoctoral training at the Massachusetts Institute of Technology in Mriganka Sur’s lab in the Brain and Cognitive Sciences department. She started her own lab in 1992 at Baylor College of Medicine and moved to Georgia State University in 1997 along with her husband Paul Katz. Pallas was promoted to full professor in 2006 and was appointed a Fellow of the American Association for the Advancement of Sciences (AAAS).

As of 2019, Pallas is an associate professor of biology at the University of Massachusetts Amherst and runs her own lab studying neural development and plasticity in auditory and visual pathways. Her lab functions under the Neuroscience and Behavior Molecular and Cellular Biology Graduate Programs in the University of Massachusetts Amherst's Biology Department.

== Career ==
In her scientific career, Sarah Pallas has worked on a variety of projects in understanding the mechanisms behind neural development and plasticity. Her prior work includes cross-modal plasticity of visual and auditory inputs in ferrets. In addition, Pallas has also worked on topographic map compression in the superior colliculus (SC).

== Awards and honors ==
During her postdoctoral training at M.I.T., Pallas was awarded a NRSA fellowship from the National Health Institute and National Eye Institute. In 2005, she received the Evolution Education Award by the National Association of Biology Teachers while working at Georgia State University. In addition, Pallas was appointed as a fellow of the American Association for the Advancement of Sciences (AAAS) in 2012. Most recently, Pallas received the Alumni Achievement Award in 2020 from her alma mater, University of Minnesota. Lastly, Pallas was awarded tenure in 2020 from the University of Massachusetts Amherst.
