= Jade Wang =

American computer programmer and neuroscientist

Jade Q. Wang
- Born: 1983 (age 42–43)
- Education: Northwestern University; Stanford University
- Occupations: Programmer, neuroscientist
- Employer(s): Sandstorm; Meteor; NASA Ames Research Center

Jade Q. Wang (born 1983) is an American computer programmer and neuroscientist. She is a co-founder of the open source project Sandstorm, and founder of the hacker-focused hostel chain Chez JJ.

== Education ==
Wang graduated from Stanford University in 2005 with a bachelor's degree in biology, where she co-authored the paper "Akt Contributes to Neuroprotection by Hypothermia against Cerebral Ischemia in Rats" in The Journal of Neuroscience. She has also been published in the Journal of Neurosurgery. She completed her Ph.D. in neuroscience in 2010 at Northwestern University, where she worked in the auditory neuroscience lab of Nina Kraus.

== Career ==
From 2010 to 2012, Wang worked as a research scientist at the NASA Ames Research Center, where she did human-computer interaction research.

Wang is the co-founder of Chez JJ with Jocelyn Berl. Chez JJ is a "chain of three hacker homes", two in San Francisco and one in Mountain View in Silicon Valley. Chez JJ has been investigated for not complying with zoning codes, and was fined by the city of San Francisco after complaints from neighbors, whose disputes with Chez JJ were widely reported in the press. Partly as a result, it shut down in 2015, after providing housing for over 400 residents.

Wang also co-founded Sandstorm, an "open source platform for personal servers". Sandstorm was initially started with crowdfunding, and later raised a $1.3 million seed round led by Quest Venture Partners. In Mar 2017, the team announced they had joined Cloudflare. Wang joined as Head of Developer Relations.
