= Mónica Andrea López Hidalgo =

Mexican scientist

- Education: Benemérita Universidad Autónoma de Puebla and Universidad Nacional Autónoma de México
- Occupation: Neuroscientist
- Employer: Universidad Nacional Autónoma de México

Mónica López Hidalgo is a Mexican scientist, professor, and researcher at the Escuela Nacional de Estudios Superiores (English: National School of Higher Education), Juriquilla campus ENES Juriquilla.

López Hidalgo received her baccalaureate in biomedicine at the Benemérita Universidad Autónoma de Puebla (BUAP) and, afterwards, obtained a master's degree and doctorate at the Neurobiology Institute of the National Autonomous University of Mexico Juriquilla campus (Spanish: Universidad Nacional Autónoma de México, UNAM). She also completed a postdoctoral fellowship in Neuroscience at the Max Planck Institute in Florida.

Her line of research is based on studying the importance and the relationship of astrocytes in cognitive functions such as learning, memory, and focus. At the same time, she conducted research on the mechanisms that lead to age-associated deterioration of cognitive and motor function, with the goal of preventing or lessening this deterioration.

She is one of the winners of the 2017 L'Oréal-UNESCO Awards for Women in Science for her research on age-related deterioration of cognitive function.
