= Lisa Stowers =

American neuroscientist and researcher

Lisa Stowers is an American neuroscientist studying pheromone signaling and response. She is a professor in the Department of Neuroscience at Scripps Research.

== Early life and education ==
Lisa was born Lisa Tanguay in Petaluma, California.

Stowers completed her PhD at Harvard University in Molecular and Cellular Biology in 1997.

== Career and research ==
Stowers became an associate professor at Scripps Research in 2002. She initially had a joint appointment in the Cell Biology and Neuroscience departments and later became a part of the Molecular and Cellular Neuroscience departments. She gained tenure and was promoted to full professor in 2016.

Stowers' research focuses on how neurons sense and respond to pheromones, especially the molecular pathways in mouse neurons that lead to predictable behaviors. She has made several discoveries connecting pheromone sensing and emotional and behavioral response in mice, including scent compounds that lead to fear, aggression, mating, or pup suckling.

== Awards and honors ==
- 2004 Pew Biomedical Scholar
