= Lisa Goodrich =

American neuroscientist

- Born: Washington D.C.
- Education: Harvard University; Stanford University
- Scientific career
- Fields: Neurobiology
- Workplaces: Harvard University
- Doctoral advisor: Matthew Scott
- Website: goodrich.med.harvard.edu

Lisa V. Goodrich is a professor in the Department of Neurobiology at the Harvard Medical School.

== Biography ==
Lisa Vaughn Goodrich was born on March 15, 1969, in Washington, DC, daughter of Robert Lindner Goodrich and Nancy Nicholes Goodrich. When she was three years old, her family moved to Carlisle, Massachusetts, and in 1978 moved to Concord, Massachusetts. She graduated in 1987 from Concord Carlisle High School. She then attended Harvard University, where she graduated summa cum laude in 1991.

After spending a year at University College Dublin, she completed her Ph.D. program in Neuroscience at Stanford University in 1998. She then did a postdoctoral fellowship under Marc Tessier-Lavigne at the University of California, San Francisco. There, she cultivated a particular interest in the auditory system and utilized her familiarity with molecular genetics and cell behavior, and applied it to the sensory system. She is now a professor of Neurobiology at Harvard University where she is further investigating the circuitry of the auditory system.

Goodrich currently resides in Newton, Massachusetts. She has two children. She enjoys reading and cooking.

== Research ==
In her laboratory, her group studies the cellular and molecular mechanisms that impact the development of neural circuits. The stages of development being studied are determination, differentiation, how axonal connections are formed, and generation of behavior. Her research program focuses on detecting genes necessary for hearing and balance. Her research hopes to connect molecular pathways that are essential in cochlea development, and to influence these pathways to repair the cochlea after suffering damage. It focuses on how the steps of circuit assembly coincide to construct neural networks that are committed to particular functions. In order to do so, research from mouse molecular genetics and genomics is studied to discover how circuit assembly is regulated. The two main assemblies she studies are the auditory circuit assembly and the rental circuit assembly. Goodrich's lab utilizes various genetic techniques in mice and biochemical assays and embryological studies in chicks. She also uses forward and reverse genetic approaches in mice to gain an understanding of how genetic mutations can lead to fluctuations in hearing and balance.

She also studies morphogenesis, and how this developmental event is essential in how the nervous system functions.

== Publications ==
Goodrich currently has 42 publications on research relative to the sensory system and neurobiology. Among them are her articles on "Morphological and physiological development of auditory synapses," "Gata3 is a critical regulator of cochlear wiring," and "Deaf and dizzy mice: A genetic dissection of inner ear development."

Her laboratory has also created a number of resources that are made available to other researchers who have an interest in the inner ear and its development.

== Honors ==
In 1999 she was the recipient of a regional award from AAAS Science journal for her essay on “Patching together development and disease." This essay was based on her work in the department of Developmental Biology at Stanford University.
