= Uraina Clark =

American neuroscientist

Uraina Simone Clark
- Education: Boston University (PhD)
- Scientific career
- Workplaces: Icahn School of Medicine at Mount Sinai
- Thesis: Facial emotion recognition in Parkinson's disease (2008)

Uraina Simone Clark is an American neuroscientist and Director of the Neuropsychology and Neuroimaging Laboratory at the Icahn School of Medicine at Mount Sinai. Her research makes use of functional magnetic resonance imaging to understand how stressors impact brain and behaviour. She has studied the impact of discrimination on brain function, and shown that social discrimination results in an increase in amygdala function.

== Early life and education ==
In college Clark worked in several research labs, which taught her "the transformative potential of science" and inspired her towards a career in research. She is related to Dr. Richard A. Smith, a physician who worked in the US Surgeon General's Office of Equal Health Opportunity and oversaw the desegregation of US hospitals in the 1960s. Clark earned her doctoral degree at Boston University, where she studied the recognition of facial emotions in Parkinson's disease. She was a clinical intern in the Brown University clinical psychology consortium. Here she studied the impact of early life stress on the neural dysfunction of people with HIV.

== Research and career ==
Clark studies how brain function impacts behaviour. She has studied the effects of HIV infection and adverse life experiences influence brain structure and function. In 2016 Clark was awarded the Medical Research Council Suffrage Science award.

Clark has also studied the impact of discrimination on people's physical and mental health. She used functional magnetic resonance imaging to understand the impact of discrimination on brain function. As part of this effort, she showed that social discrimination results in an increase in amygdala function. During the COVID-19 pandemic it became apparent that Black, indigenous or people of colour (BIPOC) were most likely to develop severe forms of coronavirus disease. Clark argued that the biomedical science community must employ anti-racism approaches, coupling new policies with systems of accountability.

In 2021 Clark was included in the "Life Sciences Power 50" list of scientists, entrepreneurs and investors driving New York State's biotech boom by City & State NY.

== Select publications ==
- Clark, Uraina S.; Miller, Evan R.; Hegde, Rachal R. (2018-04-01). "Experiences of Discrimination Are Associated With Greater Resting Amygdala Activity and Functional Connectivity". Biological Psychiatry: Cognitive Neuroscience and Neuroimaging. 3 (4): 367–378. doi:10.1016/j.bpsc.2017.11.011. ISSN 2451-9022. PMC 5897058. PMID 29628069.
- Polomano, Rosemary C.; Mannes, Andrew J.; Clark, Uraina S.; Bennett, Gary J. (2001-12-01). "A painful peripheral neuropathy in the rat produced by the chemotherapeutic drug, paclitaxel". Pain. 94 (3): 293–304. doi:10.1016/s0304-3959(01)00363-3. ISSN 0304-3959. PMID 11731066. S2CID 37737020.
- Clark, Uraina S.; Neargarder, Sandy; Cronin-Golomb, Alice (2008-07-01). "Specific impairments in the recognition of emotional facial expressions in Parkinson's disease". Neuropsychologia. 46 (9): 2300–2309. doi:10.1016/j.neuropsychologia.2008.03.014. ISSN 0028-3932. PMC 2491661. PMID 18485422.
