= Deborah Yurgelun-Todd =

American neuropsychologist

Academic background
- Education: B.A., 1974, Mount Holyoke College; MA, Psychology, 1979, Boston College; M.A. 1986 Psychology, PhD, Neuropsychology, 1988, Harvard University
- Thesis: Frontal dysfunction in schizophrenia and manic depressive illness (1988)

Deborah Ann Yurgelun-Todd is an American neuropsychologist. In 2017, Yurgelun-Todd was appointed the next Director of the University of Utah's Neuroscience Initiative while simultaneously working as the co-director of the Diagnostic Neuroimaging Lab.

== Early life and education ==
Yurgelun-Todd earned her Bachelor of Arts degree from Mount Holyoke College in 1974 before enrolling at Boston College and Harvard University for her Master's degree and PhD.

== Career ==
In 2017, Yurgelun-Todd agreed to serve as the next Director of the Neuroscience Initiative and continue to work as the co-director of the Diagnostic Neuroimaging Lab. While serving as the director of the institution's Cognitive Neuroimaging Laboratory, she collaborated with members of the Utah Utes football to examine the impact of the combination of head trauma and other factors on the physical and mental health of the school's athletes. The following year, Yurgelun-Todd was one of nine researchers to be awarded a grant by the National Institutes of Health to explore the effects of cannabinoids in pain management. During the COVID-19 pandemic, she was one of a few faculty members who wrote an op-ed regarding mental health during the pandemic-caused lockdowns.
