= Marianne Fillenz =

Romanicna neuroscientist

- Born: 5 October 1924
- Died: 2012 (aged 87–88)
- Education: University of Otago; Somerville College, Oxford
- Employer: University of Oxford

Marianne Fillenz (5 October 1924 - 2012) was a neuroscientist at the University of Oxford.

== Early life and education ==
Fillenz was born in Timișoara, Romania on 5 October 1924. Her mother was Viennese and her father was Hungarian Jewish. To avoid the rise of the Nazis in Eastern Europe, her family moved to New Zealand in 1939 and settled in Christchurch. Fillenz studied medicine at the University of Otago from 1943 - 1949. Here she met John Eccles, a Professor of Physiology at the University of Otago who went on to win the Nobel Prize in Physiology or Medicine. Eccles inspired her to research physiology alongside her pre-clinical medicine studies. During her time in New Zealand she also met Karl Popper. She published her first paper whilst still a medical student, on acetylcholine and the skeletal muscle. Fillenz moved to the University of Oxford to complete a DPhil in physiology at Somerville College in 1950, under the supervision of Sybil Cooper and David Whitteridge. Her PhD focussed on the receptors that stretch eye muscles. During her first term she met John Clarke, a reproductive physiologist from Australia, and married him six months later. Fillenz and Clarke had a notably egalitarian relationship (rare for those times) in the raising of their children and in supporting each other's scientific careers.

== Research ==
Fillenz remained at Oxford for her entire life. Her research progressed to the physiology of the autonomic nervous system, where she pioneered the use of voltammetry to measure catecholamine and dopamine release. She was a lecturer at St Hilda's College until 1963, when she was awarded a tutorial fellowship at St Anne's College. Fillenz had a remarkable impact on the medical students she taught. And she was a remarkable mentor to many young faculty at Oxford, particularly women faculty. In 1990 she published Noradrenergic Neurons (Problems in the Behavioural Sciences). In 2003 she published Neuroscience: science of the brain: an introduction for young students. She published her final paper, "Memories of John Eccles", in 2012. She died later that year of cancer. From 2018 the University of Oxford have held a lecture series to honour her memory.
