= Kristina Micheva =

Bulgarian-American neuroscientist

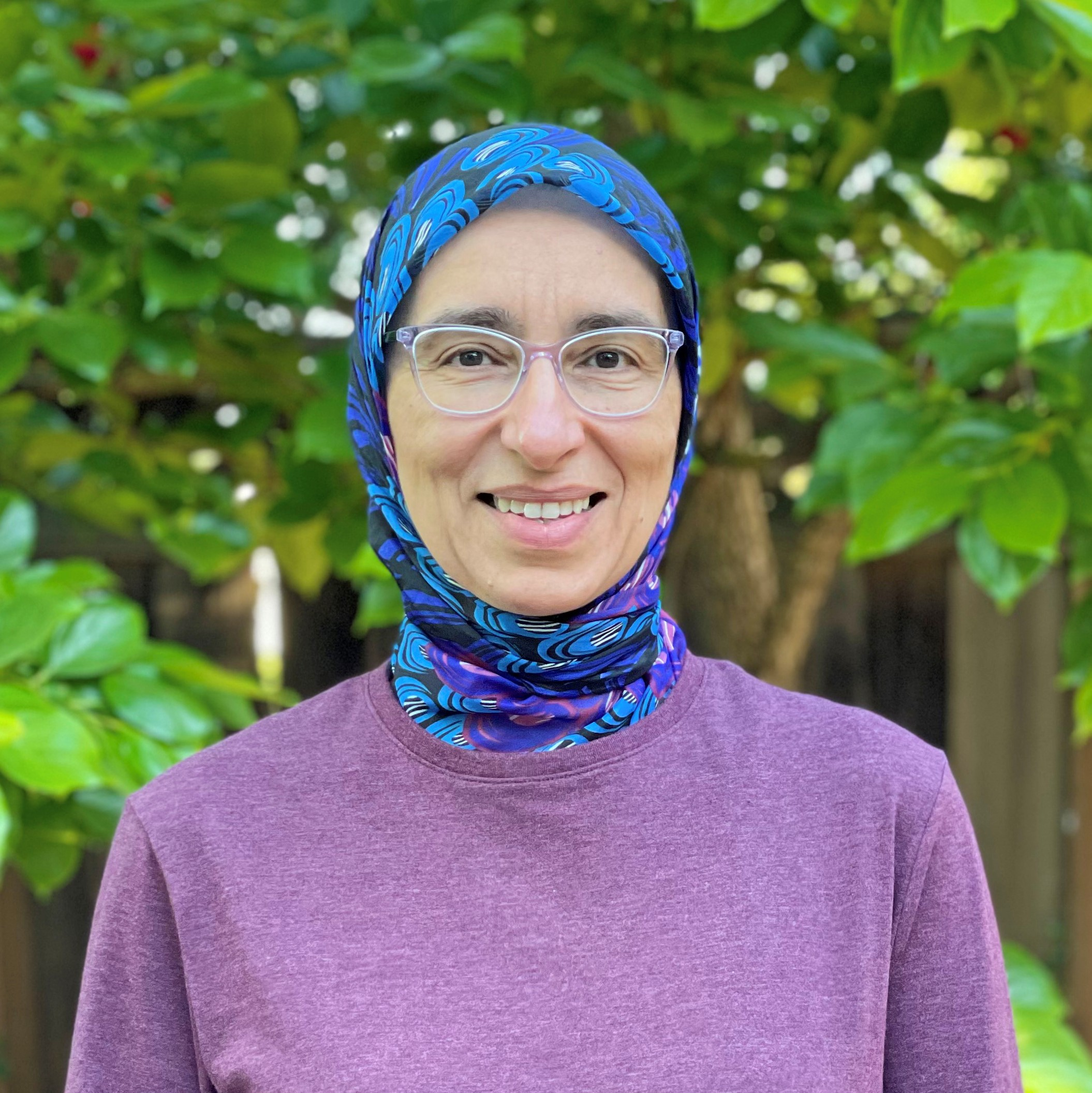
- Micheva in 2021
- Born: Sofia, Bulgaria
- Known for: Invention of Array Tomography

Academic background
- Education: Sofia University; University of Montreal

Academic work
- Discipline: Neuroscience
- Institutions: Stanford University

Dr Kristina Micheva is a Bulgarian-American neuroscientist at Stanford University. She is one of the inventors of Array Tomography, a technique in which proteins are detected with antibodies in ultra-thin sections of brain tissue using confocal microscopy.

== Education ==
Micheva was a biology major at the University of Sofia. She received a masters in plant ecology at the University of Sofia as well. After graduation, she worked in a lab at a medical university in Sofia where she learned electron microscopy and how to work with brain sections. She moved to Montreal, Quebec to pursue a PhD in neuroscience (receiving the degree in 1996). In 1996 she participated in the Marine Biological Laboratory Neurobiology Course, in which she later taught as faculty (2006-2014).

== Research ==
Micheva's main interest is in studying how brain structures develop and change with experience. During her PhD, she studied how sensory experience affects cortical development.

== Invention of Array Tomography ==
Micheva co-developed the Array Tomography technique with Stephen J Smith. In this technique, proteins are detected with antibodies in ultra-thin sections of brain tissue using confocal microscopy. This technique can be combined with electron microscopy and is the only technique that allows a voxel-conjugate joining of fluorescence and electron microscopy methods. Given the advantages of this method, it is considered an excellent choice for challenging explorations of cellular architectures in mature and developing tissues.

== Personal life ==
In her free time, Micheva practices karate. She is a third-degree black belt as of the spring of 2021, and teaches a children's karate class.
