= Kate Wassum =

American neuroscientist

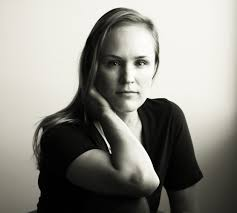
- Education: University of North Carolina at Chapel Hill, University of California, Los Angeles
- Scientific career
- Fields: Neuroscience
- Workplaces: University of California, Los Angeles
- Thesis: Neurochemistry of desire: Endogenous opioid and glutamate involvement in incentive learning and reward seeking actions (2010)
- Doctoral advisor: Dr. Bernard Balleine and Dr. Nigel Maidment

Kate Wassum is an American neuroscientist and professor of behavioral neuroscience at the University of California, Los Angeles. Wassum probes the neural circuits underlying appetitive associative learning the circuit dynamics that give rise to diverse motivated behaviors.

== Early life and education ==
Wassum completed her undergraduate degree at the University of North Carolina at Chapel Hill. She completed her undergraduate thesis under the mentorship of Dr. Mark Wightman where she studied the effects of cannabinoid modulation on dopaminergic signalling in the nucleus accumbens of rats. As an undergraduate student, Wassum was second author on the paper they published in The Journal of Neuroscience. Using fast-scan cyclic voltammetry, she helped discover that cannabinoid agonists lead to an increased frequency of extracellular dopamine transients in the nucleus accumbens. After graduating from UNC in 2004, Wassum continued on to pursue her graduate studies at the University of California, Los Angeles. At UCLA, Wassum worked under the mentorship of Dr. Bernard Balleine and Dr. Nigel Maidment studying the role of endogenous opioids in reward learning. Wassum stayed at UCLA for her postdoctoral work under the mentorship of Dr. Maidment. Wassum was funded by the Ruth L. Kirschstein predoctoral NRSA grant in 2007, 2009, and 2010 to fund her graduate work. In her postdoctoral work, Wassum studied dopamine dynamics in reward-driven behaviors. In 2012, Wassum found that phasic mesolimbic dopamine release influenced behavioral control in self-initiated action sequences.

== Research and career ==
Wassum started her own lab at UCLA in 2011 where she is currently an associate professor of Behavioral Neuroscience in the Psychology Department. The Wassum Lab studies the neural circuits underlying reward learning and associated motivated behaviors and decision making.

In addition to running her lab and teaching courses at UCLA, Wassum is also an associate editor at the Journal of Neuroscience, a senior editor at eLife, an editorial board member at Neuropsychopharmacology, ACS Chemical Neuroscience, and Scientific Reports, and is a consulting editor at the Journal of Experimental Psychology Animal Learning and Cognition.

== Awards ==
- 2024 - Brain & Behavior Research Foundation (BBRF) Distinguished Investigator Award

== Personal life ==
Wassum has one daughter and enjoys photography and hiking.
