= Nicole Rinehart =

Professor in Clinical Psychology

Nicole Rinehart is a Professor in Clinical Psychology, Director of the Deakin Child Study Centre (DCSC) and Director of Clinical and Community Partnerships at Deakin University. She established the Deakin Child Study Centre in 2013. She is located in Victoria, Australia.

== Early life and education ==
Rinehart completed her master's in clinical psychology at Deakin University in 1996 and her PhD in experimental neuropsychology at Monash University in 2000. Her PhD focused on neurobehavioral and neurophysiological examination of motor function in autism and Asperger's disorder. The aim of her research was to provide neurobehavioural and neurophysiological measures to quantify and qualify motor disturbance in these disorder groups.

== Career ==
Rinehart is a professor of clinical psychology at Deakin University. She is an honorary research fellow at the Murdoch Children's Research Institute, and an adjunct professor of clinical psychology at Monash University. Rinehart has published extensively in the areas of autism, Asperger's disorder and attention deficit hyperactivity disorder (ADHD). Rinehart has a broad profile of engagement with the community, including consultation at the Melbourne Children's Clinic, and regular engagement with schools in the community. She currently serves on the board of directors at Autism Victoria (AMAZE). She has contributed to the NHMRC Clinical Practice Statement for ADHD and the revision of the Australian Therapeutic Guidelines for Developmental Disabilities.

Rinehart has recently established a national partnership with the Australian Football League (AFL) to conduct the 'biggest game changer for children with disability' in Australia in sports to date: the establishment of the allplay.org.au web-site. This partnership is funded through Moose Toys and the National Disability Insurance Agency.

Rinehart also leads the NHMRC-funded Sleeping Sound with Autism research study in collaboration with the Murdoch Children's Research Institute, which aims to evaluate the effectiveness of a brief behavioural sleep intervention program previously demonstrated to be effective in treating sleep problems in children across a range of abilities.

== Awards and honors ==
Elaine Dignan award, Australian Psychological Society

Monash University Teaching Awards

Award for Outstanding Contribution to Research, Monash University

Rising Star Award, College of Clinical Psychologists

The Queens Trust for Young Australian Awards
