= Rachel N. Levin =

American neurobiologist (born 1953/54)

- Born: 1953 or 1954 (age 71–72)
- Education: Antioch College, Cornell University
- Known for: Animal sexual behaviour

Rachel N. Levin (born 1953 or 1954) is an American neurobiologist and ornithologist who studies animal sexual behavior. She is the William A. Hilton Professor of Zoology at Pomona College in Claremont, California.

== Early life and education ==
Levin studied biology and psychology at Antioch College, and then obtained a doctoral degree in neurobiology and behavior from Cornell University. She switched from studying communication among chimpanzees to birds because the chimpanzees kept finding and taking apart the devices she used to record and make vocalizations.

== Career ==
Levin did postdoctoral research at the University of Washington and the Smithsonian Tropical Research Institute in Panama beginning in 1982, where she observed the bay wren and pioneered the study of bird song duets.

She began teaching at Pomona College in 1991.

She became interested in transgender identity after a former student introduced her to the field, and she became frustrated by its outdated perspective.

In 2024, she was promoted to an endowed chair.
