= Sabine Spijker =

Dutch neuroscientist

Sabine Spijker is a Dutch neuroscientist who is a full professor and team leader at the Molecular and Cellular Neurobiology (MCN) department of the Center for Neurogenomics and Cognitive Research (CNCR) at the VU University Amsterdam.

Spijker's research group, Animal Models of Psychiatric Disease, focuses on how neuropsychiatric ailments, such as depression, addiction, and impulsivity, affect cognition.

== Education ==
Spijker obtained a Master of Science in Molecular Neurobiology at VU in 1994. She obtained her PhD in Neuroscience there in 1999. Spijker did her post-doctoral training at the Institut de Génétique et de Biologie Moléculaire et Cellulaire in Strasbourg (European Molecular Biology Organisation (EMBO) Long-Term Fellowship, Marie Curie) and at VU.

== Career ==
The Netherlands Organization for Scientific Research (NWO) awarded Spijker with a Vici grant to continue her research into the molecular basis of maintained depression. Since 2004, she is a Team leader at the Molecular and Cellular Neurobiology (MCN) department of the Center for Neurogenomics and Cognitive Research (CNCR) at VU. In 2006, she became a member of the Animal Welfare committee. She became a Full professor (initiated by the Fenna Diemer Lindeboom program) in 2012. In 2014, she became the program leader of the Amsterdam Neuroscience program 'Mood, Anxiety and Psychosis' and Editor-in-Chief of Amsterdam Science, a magazine for outreach of CNCR research.
