= Lisa Mosconi =

Italian American neuroscientist and author

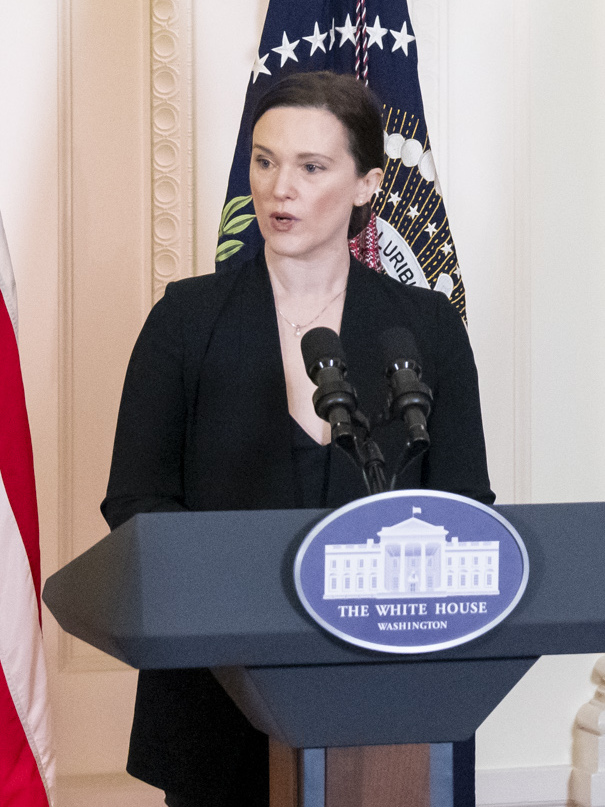
- Mosconi presenting at the inaugural Presidential Women's Health Research Conference at the White House
- Education: PhD
- Alma mater: University of Florence, New York University School of Medicine
- Spouse: Kevin Slavin
- Children: 1
- Scientific career
- Fields: Clinical neuroscience
- Workplaces: Weill Cornell Medical College
- Website: www.lisamosconi.com

Lisa Mosconi is an Italian American neuroscientist, educator, and author known for her books The Menopause Brain, The XX Brain and Brain Food. She is the director of the Alzheimer's Prevention Program and the Women’s Brain Initiative, both at Weill Cornell Medicine / NewYork-Presbyterian where she is an Associate Professor of Neuroscience in Neurology and Radiology. Mosconi is currently serving as Program Director at Wellcome Leap, a global human health research organization.

== Early life and education ==
Mosconi was born in Florence, Italy and both of her parents are nuclear physicists. There is a history of Alzheimer's disease in her family which affected her grandmother and her grandmother's two sisters. She received a five-year university degree in Experimental Psychology and Ph.D. in Neuroscience and Nuclear Medicine from the University of Florence, in collaboration with New York University School of Medicine. She moved to the United States when she was 24.

== Research ==
Her research focuses on the early detection of Alzheimer’s disease in at-risk individuals, women in particular. This is the topic of her book The Menopause Brain where she explains that menopause is a neurological as well as hormonal process; she believes in reframing brain health as a vital, yet overlooked component of women’s health. Her research has shown that women at risk for Alzheimer’s disease developed amyloid plaques, linked to the disease, during perimenopause, a time earlier than previously thought. This research changes the treatment and intervention window for health care professionals trying to prevent Alzheimer’s and chronic diseases that affect people in older age.

She is funded via a combination of grants from the NIH/NIA to study Alzheimer’s and women’s brains, and funding from private foundations and philanthropic support. She is a member of the AARP brain health council and is on the Aspen Brain Institute Scientific Advisory Council.

In 2025, Mosconi joined Wellcome Leap as Program Director of CARE (Cutting Alzheimer's Risk through Endocrinology), a $50 million, three-year research initiative. The program aims to halve the lifetime risk of Alzheimer's disease among women, with the potential to prevent 54.5 million cases globally by 2050. CARE addresses the pronounced sex disparity in Alzheimer's incidence — a 45-year-old woman faces roughly twice the lifetime risk of her male counterpart — by focusing on the intersection of neuroendocrine aging and neurodegeneration. The program employs an individualized medicine framework, using biomarkers, advanced neuroimaging, and genetic profiling to identify female-specific neuroendocrine targets and tailor interventions for at-risk women. CARE concentrates on midlife women, when prevention efforts are considered most effective, and emphasizes research advances that improve access and reduce cost to maximize global reach.

== Media and publishing ==
Mosconi's TED Talk on how menopause affects the brain has been viewed over four million times, and in 2024 she spoke at the inaugural Presidential Women’s Health Research Conference at the White House, which highlighted the significant funding and research disparities in women’s health.

Her books The Menopause Brain and The XX Brain are New York Times bestsellers. Her book Brain Food discusses which foods are more beneficial for brain health, and looks at research which shows that a poor diet and a lack of hydration can be damaging to the brain especially as it gets older.
