= Petra Ritter (neuroscientist) =

German neuroscientist

- Born: Petra Wobst; 1974 (age 51–52)
- Title: Prof. Dr. med.

Academic background
- Education: Charité

Academic work
- Discipline: Computational and Clinical Neuroscience
- Institutions: Max Planck Institute for Human Cognitive and Brain Sciences, Charité
- Main interests: Personalised brain simulations
- Notable works: The Virtual Brain

Petra Ritter (née Wobst; born 1974) is a German neuroscientist and medical doctor at Charité in Berlin. Her field is computational neuroscience and her focus is developing brain simulations for individual people with neurological conditions, combining EEG and neuroimaging data.

Ritter studied medicine at Humboldt University Berlin. She did residencies at UCLA, UCSD, Mount Sinai School of Medicine in New York, and Harvard Medical School, as well as Charité. In 2002, she received her medical license to practice medicine. In 2004, she completed her doctoral thesis at Charité under Arno Villringer.

She led a lab at Max Planck Institute for Human Cognitive and Brain Sciences in Leipzig from 2011 to 2015.

She is a co-founder of The Virtual Brain open-source brain simulation platform. Since October 2017 she has held a lifetime BIH Johanna-Quandt Full Professorship of Brain Simulation at the Dept. of Neurology at the Charité and Berlin Institute of Health.

As of 2018, her most-cited papers were:

- Moosmann, M; Ritter, P; Krastel, I; Brink, A; Thees, S; Blankenburg, F; Taskin, B; Obrig, H; Villringer, A (September 2003). "Correlates of alpha rhythm in functional magnetic resonance imaging and near infrared spectroscopy". NeuroImage. 20 (1): 145–58. doi:10.1016/s1053-8119(03)00344-6. PMID 14527577. S2CID 39614622.
- Ritter, P; Moosmann, M; Villringer, A (April 2009). "Rolandic alpha and beta EEG rhythms' strengths are inversely related to fMRI-BOLD signal in primary somatosensory and motor cortex". Human Brain Mapping. 30 (4): 1168–87. doi:10.1002/hbm.20585. PMC 6870597. PMID 18465747.
- Obrig, H; Wenzel, R; Kohl, M; Horst, S; Wobst, P; Steinbrink, J; Thomas, F; Villringer, A (March 2000). "Near-infrared spectroscopy: does it function in functional activation studies of the adult brain?". International Journal of Psychophysiology. 35 (2–3): 125–42. doi:10.1016/s0167-8760(99)00048-3. PMID 10677642.
- Ritter, P; Villringer, A (2006). "Simultaneous EEG-fMRI". Neuroscience and Biobehavioral Reviews. 30 (6): 823–38. doi:10.1016/j.neubiorev.2006.06.008. PMID 16911826. S2CID 1032514.
- Freyer, F; Roberts, JA; Becker, R; Robinson, PA; Ritter, P; Breakspear, M (27 April 2011). "Biophysical mechanisms of multistability in resting-state cortical rhythms". The Journal of Neuroscience. 31 (17): 6353–61. doi:10.1523/JNEUROSCI.6693-10.2011. PMC 6622680. PMID 21525275.
