= Julianne Holt-Lunstad =

American psychologist

- Born: Minneapolis, U.S.
- Education: Brigham Young University (B.S., M.S.); University of Utah (Ph.D.)
- Children: 2
- Scientific career
- Fields: Psychology
- Workplaces: Brigham Young University

Julianne Holt-Lunstad is a psychologist and professor of psychology and neuroscience, and director of the Social Connection and Health Lab, at Brigham Young University. She is a fellow of the Society of Experimental Social Psychology and Association for Psychological Science.

== Life and career ==
Holt-Lunstad was born in Minneapolis. She earned her bachelor's degree and master's degree from Brigham Young University in 1994 and 1998, respectively, and her Ph.D. from the University of Utah in 2001. After completing her Ph.D., Holt-Lunstad joined the faculty of the department of psychology at Brigham Young University as an assistant professor.

== Research ==
Holt-Lunstad specializes in psychology and neuroscience. Her research focuses on the long-term health effects of social connections and includes a meta-analysis on the effects of loneliness and social isolation on mortality. That research has linked loneliness to deteriorating health.

Holt-Lunstad was the first researcher to publish studies connecting poor social support to mortality.

As a result of her in-depth research, Holt-Lunstad was selected to serve as the lead scientific editor for the US Surgeon General's Advisory "Our Epidemic of Loneliness and Isolation" and a scientific advisor for the Australian Coalition to End Loneliness in 2017. She has also been called to testify in front of the United States Congress Special Committee on Aging regarding her research.

In 2018, Holt-Lunstad was awarded BYU's Karl G. Maeser Research & Creative Arts Award. She is also a fellow of the Society of Experimental Social Psychology and the Association for Psychological Science.
