= Laurence Lanfumey =

French neuroscientist

Laurence Lanfumey-Mongredien
- Born: 7 November 1954 (age 70)
- Education: PhD in Neurophysiology, University of Paris VI (Pierre-and-Marie-Curie University)(1981)
- Known for: Pathophysiology of mood disorders
- Awards: CINP, Prix Georges de Saint-Blanquat
- Scientific career
- Fields: Neuroscience
- Institutions: Centre de Psychiatrie et Neurosciences (CPN) INSERM U894

Laurence Lanfumey-Mongredien is a neuroscientist specializing in preclinical research in neuroscience and molecular neuropsychopharmacology. Based at INSERM, she is the team leader of the “Pathophysiology of anxio-depressive and addictive disorders” research group. She is also a member of many scientific communities, most notably having served as a councilor on the executive committee of the European College of Neuropsychopharmacology.

== Career ==
=== Education ===
Lanfumey received her PhD in Neurophysiology from Pierre and Marie Curie University (Paris VI). Having conducted research at the Universities of Princeton and Yale in the US, she is currently based at INSERM (Paris) as a Director of Research of the Research Centre of Psychiatry and Neuroscience.

=== Research focus/interests ===
Lanfumey is the team leader of the “Pathophysiology of anxio-depressive and addictive disorders” research group. Its aim is to analyze the roles of environmental and genetic factors on the treatment of psychiatric disorders such as depression, anxiety, and addiction.

=== Awards and grants ===
Lanfumey has won a number of awards and grants:

- 1994: Collegium International NeuroPsychoPharmacologicum (CINP)
- 2002: Merck Sharp and Dohme Medical School Grant (UK)
- 2013: Prix Georges de Saint-Blanquat (Ireb, France)

=== Positions of trust and research assessments ===
Lanfumey is on the editorial board of many journals including Neurochemical Research, Naunyn-Schmiedeberg Archives of Pharmacology, Neuroscience, Courrier des Addictions and Frontiers of Neuropharmacology. She is also a member of various scientific societies including the Society for Neurosciences (US), the Association Francaise de Psychiatrie Biologique et de Neuropsychopharmacologie (France), and the European College of Neuropsychopharmacology as a member of the ECNP Review Board and, between 2013 and 2019, the ECNP Executive Committee.

== Publications ==
Lanfumey has published extensively. She is co author of 105 papers and reviews in international journals (h index=36).
