= Lisa Saksida =

Canadian neuroscientist

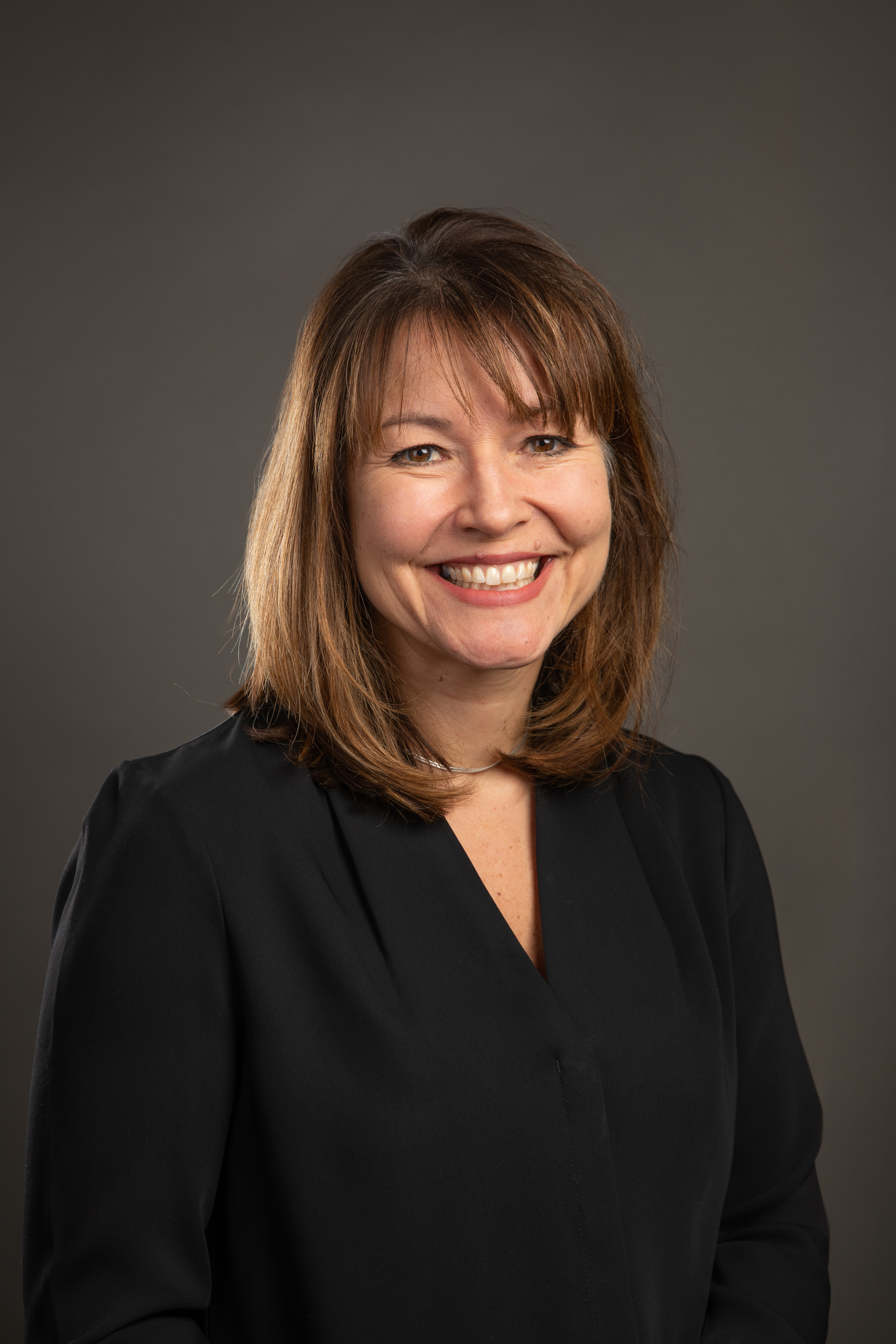
- Spouse: Timothy John Bussey
- Awards: Fellow of the Royal Society of Canada, Fellow of the Canadian Academy of Health Sciences

Academic background
- Education: BSc, Psychology, University of Western Ontario; MA, Biopsychology, University of British Columbia; MSc, Artificial Intelligence, University of Edinburgh; PhD, Robotics and Neural Basis of Cognition, Carnegie Mellon University
- Thesis: The Interaction of Perception and Cognition: A Competitive Connectionist Model of the Effects of Experience on Perceptual Representations (1999)

Lisa Marie Saksida is a Canadian neuroscientist. She is a Professor and Canada Research Chair in Translational Cognitive Neuroscience at the University of Western Ontario's Schulich School of Medicine & Dentistry. Since 2000, Saksida has worked on the development of a touchscreen-based cognitive assessment system specifically for mouse models.

== Early life and education ==
Saksida is a native of Calgary, Alberta, Canada. She completed her Bachelor of Science degree at the University of Western Ontario before flying West for her Master's degree at the University of British Columbia. She eventually left Canada for her second master's degree at the University of Edinburgh before finally returning to North America for her PhD at Carnegie Mellon University. Saksida received a grant from the Alberta Heritage Scholarships Fund to support her doctoral studies. Her thesis, conducted under advisor James McClelland, was titled The Interaction of Perception and Cognition: A Competitive Connectionist Model of the Effects of Experience on Perceptual Representations. Following her PhD, she held a Fogarty Fellowship at the National Institute of Mental Health but left this after a year to take up a Pinsent Darwin Research Associateship at the University of Cambridge.

== Career ==
Saksida and her husband, Timothy John Bussey, worked together at the University of Cambridge for 15 years where they specialized in understanding cognition. During their tenure in England, she was a principal investigator in the Translational Cognitive Neuroscience Lab where she researched the fundamental psychological processes involved in memory and perception. In this role, she co-developed a touchscreen method for cognitive testing of rodents. They built a toaster oven sized chamber to house test mice and test their cognitive ability by using IPads. Saksida and her husband eventually left Cambridge for her alma mater, the University of Western Ontario, in 2016.

As a full professor at the University of Western Ontario, Saksida was appointed a Tier 1 Canada Research Chair in Translational Cognitive Neuroscience to support her research in 2017. During the COVID-19 pandemic, Saksida was elected a Fellow of the Royal Society of Canada for being "a world pioneer in developing touchscreen technology that helps researchers test cognition in mouse models of brain disease in a way that is relevant to human patients." She also worked in partnership with the Alzheimer Society London and Middlesex (ASLM) and the Alzheimer Society of Ontario to better understand the experiences of care partners in southwestern Ontario during the pandemic. Later, Saksida's research was also recognized with an election to the Canadian Academy of Health Sciences and honoured as one of the WXN Top 100 "for outstanding Canadian women who advocate for workforce diversity and inspire tomorrow’s leaders."
