= Sandhya Koushika =

Indian neuroscientist

- Education: Maharaja Sayajirao University, Brandeis University
- Awards: HHMI International Early Career Fellowship (2012 - Present)
- Scientific career
- Fields: Neuroscience
- Workplaces: Tata Institute of Fundamental Research, Mumbai

Sandhya Koushika is an Indian neuroscientist, currently working at the Tata Institute of Fundamental Research, Mumbai. Her main area of interest is regulation of axonal transport within nerve cells. She is a recipient of the International Early Career Award by the Howard Hughes Medical Institute (USA).

== Education and career ==
Koushika earned her B.Sc. and M.Sc. degrees from Maharaja Sayajirao University and received her Ph.D. in Cellular and Molecular Biology from Brandeis University. Her postdoctoral training was at Washington University in St. Louis. Prior to her current appointment at TIFR, Mumbai, she was a faculty at the National Centre for Biological Sciences, Bangalore.

== Research ==
Koushika studies traffic within nerve cells, called axonal transport. Though not always the case for traffic on the streets, within neurons, this process is tightly coordinated. The "vehicles" that carry out this transport are called molecular motors. It is their purview as to what cargo should be carried, what the start and end points of the journey would be - depending on when and where they are needed.

Studying this process is challenging, partly because anesthetising model organism also suspends axonal transport. So, watching it unfold is not easy. Her group, in collaboration, set up a microfluidic approach to study transport in roundworms. Through this approach, live worm is immobilised in a chip and axonal transport studied. Following this approach, her group is starting to uncover regulation of each of the various steps of axonal transport, such as fate of the motor protein that carries the cargo.

Loss of control in this process is seen in neurodegenerative diseases, Amyotrophic Lateral Sclerosis (ALS) and Charcot–Marie–Tooth2A, an inherited condition that retards the transmission of nerve impulses in the feet and legs.

== Early life ==
Reading the biography of Marie Curie had a tremendous impact on her. Koushika recalls being interested in research from early on. Her parents supported her interest, which was also widely known in their circle of family friends, who would send her articles from Scientific American.
