= Michelle Gray =

Michelle Gray may refer to:

- Michelle Gray (neuroscientist)
- Michelle Gray (politician)
