= Sarah Garfinkel =

British neuroscientist

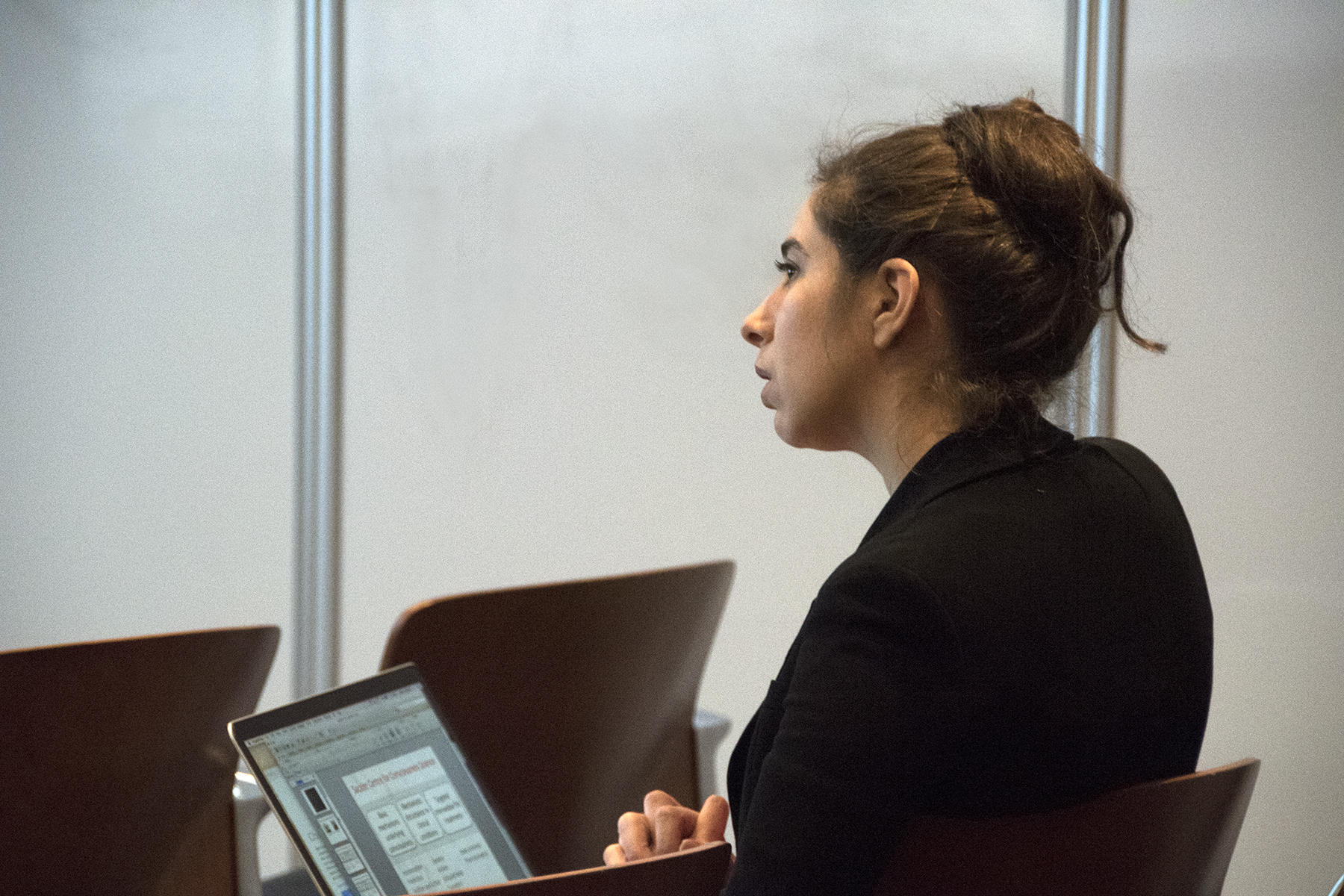
- Citizenship: United Kingdom
- Education: University of Sussex
- Scientific career
- Fields: Neuroscience, Psychiatry
- Workplaces: University of Sussex; Brighton and Sussex Medical School
- Thesis: Modulating false and veridical memory : the effects of repetition and alcohol at encoding (2006)

Sarah Garfinkel is a British neuroscientist and Professor of neuroscience and psychiatry based at University College London. Her research is focused on the link between interoception and emotion and memory. In 2018, she was selected as one of 11 researchers on the Nature Index 2018 Rising Stars.

== Background ==
Garfinkel was born at University College Hospital in London. She completed her PhD in Experimental Psychology at the University of Sussex in 2006, working on the effects of alcohol consumption on memory encoding. She did a postdoc at the University of Michigan studying the memory recall in veterans with posttraumatic stress disorder (PTSD). In 2011 she joined the Brighton and Sussex Medical School as a postdoctoral fellow with Hugo Critchley.

== Research ==
Garfinkel's research focuses on interoception, the ability to sense ones own body, and the link between interoception and the brain. She specifically focuses on the heartbeat, and has shown that the heartbeat, and perception thereof, influences the way people process fear. Her research has furthermore shown that autistic people experience difficulty judging their heartbeat, causing anxiety and stress. This research has led to the development of a new therapy technique called interoception-directed therapy, which aims to reduce anxiety in autistic individuals.

== Outreach ==
Garfinkel has been involved in number of radio and TV shows. She was a guest on 'All in the Mind' and 'The Shock'. She also gave a talk at TEDxBrighton in 2017. In 2018 she was featured in a short film by the BBC, where she talked about her research on interoception and autism.
