= Ol'ga Leonova =

Physician and embryologist

Olga Vassilievna Leonova, later Leonowa-von Lange (fl. 1890–1910), born 1851 or 1859, was a physician and embryologist known for her studies of neuroembryology and congenital disorders, specifically those affecting the brain, spinal cord, eyes and limbs.

Leonova was one of the first female scholars to work in Constantin von Monakow's laboratory ("Labörli"), founded in 1885, the origin the Zürch Brain Research Institute Brain Research Institute of Zurich University. (von Monakow, 1970)

Leonova, born in Russia, studied medicine in Moscow, St. Petersburg, Vienna and Leipzig. Later, she did research work at the Imperial University of Moscow's cutting-edge neurobiology laboratories. Her research focussed on stillborn infants with congenital brain disease (anencephalia, anophthalmia, amyelia). Here she described the connection between central nervous system damage and congenital eye disease. She earned her doctoral degree before 1904, and published at least 12 scientific papers between 1890 and 1909 but did not show further scientific development (Refs.). After a head start into the European neuroscience scene in 1894 as the only female scientist presenting at the 66. central conference of German-speaking naturalists and physicians in Vienna, she later apparently lost the support of the science community. This may partly be due to her argumentative, almost belligerent style of writing. Her work was cited for a short period and the forgotten. She eventually resided in a villa in Laufenburg, Germany, at the border to Switzerland, and was arrested in 1914 as a Russian spy. After two years, she was allowed to move to Zürich.

== Publications ==
- 1890
  - Ein Fall von Anencephalie. Ueber den feineren Bau des Rückenmarkes eines Anencephalus. Archiv fuer Anatomie und Physiologie (Anat. Abth.) 403–422
- 1893a
  - Ueber das Verhalten der Neuroblasten des Occipitallappens bei Anophthalmie und Bulbusatrophie und seine Beziehungen zum Sehact. Archiv fuer Anatomie und Physiologie (Anat. Abth.) 308–318
- 1893b
  - Zur pathologischen Entwickelung des Centralnervensystems. (ein Fall von Anencephalie combiniert mit totaler Amyelie). Neurologisches Centralblatt 7: 218–227; 8: 263–267
- 1894a
  - Contribution a l’etude de l’evolution pathologique du systeme nerveux. Anencephalie totale combine avec une amyelia et un rhachischisis totaux chez un embryon humain. Moscou Soc Nat Bull 7: 191–198
- 1894b
  - Die Sinnesorgane und Ganglien bei Anencephalie und Amyelie. (zweiter Fall von totaler Amyelie). Verhandlungen der Gesellschaft deutscher Naturforscher und Aerzte, 2. Hälfte, Neurologisches Centralblatt 13: 176–177
- 1896
  - Beiträge zur Kenntniss der secundären Veränderungen der primären optischen Centren und Bahnen in Fällen von congenitaler Anophthalmie und Bulbusatrophie bei neugeborenen Kindern. Archiv für Psychiatrie und Nervenkrankheiten 28: 53–96
- 1897
  - Einige Bemerkungen zu im Archiv für Psychiatrie Bd. 28, H. 1, erschienenen Abhandlung: Beiträge zur Kenntnis der secundären Veränderungen der primären optischen Centren und Bahnen in Fällen von congenitaler Anophthalmie und Bulbusatrophie bei neugeborenen Kindern. Moscou Soc Nat Bull 10: 570–574
- 1904
  - Zur pathologischen Entwickelung des Centralnervensystems (neue Beiträge). Ein Fall von Cyclopie combinirt mit Mikro- und Arhinencephalie. Archiv für Psychiatrie und Nervenkrankheiten 38: 862–894
- 1905
  - Missbildungen und Entwicklungsstörungen im Gehirn (Abstract). Jahresbericht über die Leistungen und Fortschritte auf dem Gebiet der Neurologie und Psychiatrie
- 1907
  - Zur pathologischen Entwickelung des Centralnervensystems. Das Verhalten der Rinde der Sulci calcarina in einem Falle von Mikrophthalmia und Amelie (Amputation spontanee). Monatsschrift für Psychiatrie und Neurologie 21:176
- 1908
  - Zur pathologischen Entwickelung des Centralnervensystems. Ein Fall von Amelia (Amputation spontanea) (neue Beiträge). Archiv für Psychiatrie und Nervenkrankheiten 43: 1218–1252
- 1909
  - Zur pathologischen Entwickelung des Centralnervensystems. Das Verhalten der Rinde des Sulci calcarina in einem Falle von Mikrophthalmia bilateralis congenita. Archiv für Psychiatrie und Nervenkrankheiten 45: 77–91
