= Paula Isabel da Silva Moreira =

Portuguese scientist

- Moreira receiving 2008 L'oreal Prize.
- Born: January 4, 1975 (age 51); France
- Citizenship: Portugal
- Education: University of Coimbra (Ph.D., 2007)
- Known for: Discoveries concerning mitochondrial oxidation in Alzheimer's disease
- Awards: 2008 L'oreal Prize, Calouste Gulbenkian Foundation Stimulus for Research Prize (2003)
- Scientific career
- Fields: Neurology, Pathology
- Workplaces: University of Coimbra, Case Western Reserve University
- Doctoral advisor: George Perry
- Other academic advisors: Catarina Oliveira

Paula Isabel da Silva Moreira (born January 4, 1975) is a neuroscientist and Associate Professor of Physiology at the University of Coimbra. Moreira is recognized in the field of Alzheimer's disease research particularly for her work on bioenergetics.

Moreira is Co-Editor of Journal of Alzheimer's Disease and recipient of Stimulus for Research prize in 2003 by the Calouste Gulbenkian Foundation. She also received the L'Oreal for Women in Science award (2008) supported by L'Oreal Portugal/UNESCO/Foundation for Science and Technology (FCT).

== Education ==
Moreira received her PhD in Biomedical Sciences from University of Coimbra in 2007.

== Research focus ==
Moreira's research is primarily focused on the impact of neurodegenerative conditions on brain function with special focus on bioenergetics. The physiologic process of aging and the pathologic process of diabetes have also been studied by Moreira as important risk factors for neurodegeneration.
