= Gladys Maestre =

Venezuela-born Neuroscientist

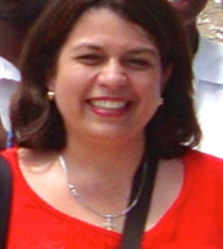
- Education: University of Zulia School of Medicine; Columbia University
- Scientific career
- Workplaces: University of Texas Rio Grande Valley School of Medicine; University of Zulia
- Thesis: Apolipoproteins and Alzheimer's disease (1996)

Gladys Elena Maestre is a neuroscientist from Venezuela who is a professor at the University of Texas Rio Grande Valley School of Medicine. She is known for her work on Alzheimer's disease and other forms of dementia.

== Education and career ==
Maestre has a B.S. from St. Vincent of Paul in the city of Maracaibo and in 1989 she was awarded an M.D. degree by the University of Zulia School of Medicine. She received an M.Phil. (1995) and a Ph.D. (1996) from Columbia University. Maestre taught psychiatry and neurosciences from 1992 through 2014 at the University of Zulia. She served as director of the Neuroscience Laboratory of the Institute of Biological Research School of Medicine. As of 2022, Maestre is a professor of neurosciences and human genetics at the University of Texas Rio Grande Valley School of Medicine (UTRGV). She is also director of the UTRGV Alzheimer's Disease Resource Center for Research on Aging of Minorities, and directs the Maracaibo Aging Study, a community-based longitudinal study of age-related diseases.

== Work ==
Maestre's doctoral research focused on the influence of brain genetics on mental health and memory-based diseases, demonstrating that the presence of the Ԑ4 allele of the apolipoprotein gene is related to the risk of Alzheimer's disease. Maestre has led international initiatives to build capacity for research and services aimed at improving prevention and treatment of dementia and other age-related diseases in low-to-middle-income countries, Bolivia, Haiti, and Venezuela. In 2021, she was funded to work on Alzheimer's in the Rio Grande Valley which has a high rate of memory loss among seniors.

== Awards and recognition ==
In 2000, Maestre received the Bruce S. Schoenberg Award for neuroepidemiology from the American Academy of Neurology. In 2018 she received the highest distinction for life in science from the Bolivian Institute of Cognitive Neuroscience. The University of Texas Rio Grande Valley awarded her with the 2019 excellence award for research.

== Selected publications ==
- Kalaria, Raj N; Maestre, Gladys E; Arizaga, Raul; Friedland, Robert P; Galasko, Doug; Hall, Kathleen; Luchsinger, José A; Ogunniyi, Adesola; Perry, Elaine K; Potocnik, Felix; Prince, Martin (September 2008). "Alzheimer's disease and vascular dementia in developing countries: prevalence, management, and risk factors". The Lancet Neurology. 7 (9): 812–826. doi:10.1016/S1474-4422(08)70169-8. PMC 2860610. PMID 18667359.
- Mayeux, R.; Ottman, R.; Maestre, G.; Ngai, C.; Tang, M.-X.; Ginsberg, H.; Chun, M.; Tycko, B.; Shelanski, M. (1995). "Synergistic Effects of Traumatic Head Injury and Apolipoprotein-epsilon4 in Patients With Alzheimer's Disease". Neurology. 45 (3): 555–557. doi:10.1212/WNL.45.3.555. ISSN 0028-3878. PMID 7898715. S2CID 24390962.
- Maestre, Gladys; Ottman, Ruth; Stern, Yaakov; Gurland, Barry; Chun, Michael; Tang, Ming-Xin; Shelanski, Michael; Tycko, Benjamin; Mayeux, Richard (1995). "Apolipoprotein E and alzheimer's disease: Ethnic variation in genotypic risks". Annals of Neurology. 37 (2): 254–259. doi:10.1002/ana.410370217. ISSN 1531-8249. PMID 7847867. S2CID 24556884.
- Nitrini, Ricardo; Bottino, Cássio M. C.; Albala, Cecilia; Custodio Capuñay, Nilton Santos; Ketzoian, Carlos; Llibre Rodriguez, Juan J.; Maestre, Gladys E.; Ramos-Cerqueira, Ana Teresa A.; Caramelli, Paulo (August 2009). "Prevalence of dementia in Latin America: a collaborative study of population-based cohorts". International Psychogeriatrics. 21 (4): 622–630. doi:10.1017/S1041610209009430. hdl:11449/12504. ISSN 1041-6102. PMC 8324310. PMID 19505354. S2CID 23680151.
