= Maria G. Castro =

Argentine-American neuroscientist

- Born: Buenos Aires, Argentina
- Education: National University of La Plata (BSc, M.Sc, PhD)
- Scientific career
- Workplaces: University of California, Los Angeles; University of Michigan Medical School

Maria G. Castro is an Argentine neuroscientist. She is the R. C. Schneider Collegiate Professor of Neurosurgery and a Professor of Cell and Developmental Biology at the University of Michigan Medical School. Her research focuses on cancer immunology and gliomas.

== Early life and education ==
Castro was born and raised in Buenos Aires, Argentina. In 1979, Castro received her bachelor's degree in chemistry from the National University of La Plata (UNLP) in Argentina. She stayed at UNLP for master's degrees in biochemistry in 1981 and education technology in 1986, and a Ph.D in biochemistry in 1986. After her studies, she did research fellowships at the National Institutes of Health in the United States as a Fogarty International Visiting Research Fellow in 1988, and at the University of Reading in the United Kingdom in 1990.

Castro married Dr. Pedro R. Lowenstein in 1988, and they run a joint research lab.

== Career ==
Castro and Lowenstein joined the faculty of the University of California, Los Angeles in 2001. In 2011, they moved their joint lab to the University of Michigan.

Currently, Castro is the R. C. Schneider Collegiate Professor of Neurosurgery and Professor of Cell and Developmental Biology at the University of Michigan Medical School. Her research focuses on cancer immunology, including studies of the tumor microenvironment and forms of brain cancer.

Castro was awarded the 2016 Javits Neuroscience Investigator Award from the National Institutes of Health's National Institute of Neurological Disorders and Stroke. The award provided $2.8 million in research funding for her laboratory.

University of Michigan's Rogel Cancer Center named Castro as a 2020 Forbes Scholar, providing funding for her research into models of glioblastoma.
