= Astrid Linthorst =

Professor of neuroscience

- Education: PhD Rudolf Magnus Institute, University of Utrecht
- Known for: Neuroendocrine and behavioral responses to stress
- Awards: Wellcome Trust Grant, BBSRC Grant
- Scientific career
- Fields: Neuroscience
- Workplaces: University of Bristol, School of Clinical Sciences

Astrid Linthorst is a professor of neuroscience at the School of Clinical Sciences at the University of Bristol, UK. Specializing in the neurochemistry and neuroendocrinology of stress and behavior, she heads a research group on the mechanisms that support coping with stress in the brain. She is also chair of the Scientific Programme Committee of the ECNP Congress and a member of the European College of Neuropsychopharmacology (ECNP) Executive Committee.

== Career ==
=== Education ===
Linthorst received her PhD in Pharmacology at the Rudolf Magnus Institute of Neuroscience at the University of Utrecht, the Netherlands. After completing her PhD, she was a scientist and research group head at the Max Planck Institute in Munich. She is currently a professor of neuroscience at the University of Bristol. Prior to this appointment, she served as a senior lecturer and reader in neuroscience within the department. She is also the director of the MSc program in molecular neuroscience and co-director of the MRes program in systems neuroscience.

=== Research focus/interests ===
Linthorst heads a research group that studies stress, specifically the neurochemical and neuroendocrine mechanisms that support coping with stress. The group also studies the effects of exercise on stress relief. The research group is funded by the Wellcome Trust and the European Union.

=== Awards ===
Linthorst has been awarded two grants from the Wellcome Trust, a biomedical research charity based in London. She also received a grant from the Biotechnology and Biological Sciences Research Council (BBSRC).

=== Positions of trust and research assessments ===
Linthorst is a member of the Society for Neuroscience, the British Neuroscience Association, the British Society for Neuroendocrinology, the British Association for Psychopharmacology, and the European College of Neuropsychopharmacology (ECNP), where she chairs the Scientific Programme Committee of the ECNP Congress.

== Publications ==
Linthorst has published extensively. Key publications include:

- Beekman, Marjolein; Flachskamm, Cornelia; Linthorst, Astrid C. E. (May 2005). "Effects of exposure to a predator on behaviour and serotonergic neurotransmission in different brain regions of C57bl/6N mice". European Journal of Neuroscience. 21 (10): 2825–2836. doi:10.1111/j.1460-9568.2005.04107.x. PMID 15926930. S2CID 29897536.
- De Groote, Lotte; Peñalva, Rosana G.; Flachskamm, Cornelia; Reul, Johannes M. H. M.; Linthorst, Astrid C. E. (July 2005). "Differential monoaminergic, neuroendocrine and behavioural responses after central administration of corticotropin-releasing factor receptor type 1 and type 2 agonists". Journal of Neurochemistry. 94 (1): 45–56. doi:10.1111/j.1471-4159.2005.03164.x. PMID 15953348. S2CID 32274727.
- Droste, Susanne K.; Gesing, Angela; Ulbricht, Sabine; Müller, Marianne B.; Linthorst, Astrid C. E.; Reul, Johannes M. H. M. (July 2003). "Effects of long-term voluntary exercise on the hypothalamic-pituitary-adrenal axis in mice". Endocrinology. 144 (7). The Endocrine Society: 3012–3023. doi:10.1210/en.2003-0097. PMID 12810557.
- Peñalva, Rosana G.; Lancel, Marike; Flachskamm, Cornelia; Reul, Johannes M. H. M.; Holsboer, Florian; Linthorst, Astrid C. E. (May 2003). "Effect of sleep and sleep deprivation on serotonergic neurotransmission in the hippocampus: a combined in vivo microdialysis/EEG study in rats". European Journal of Neuroscience. 17 (9). Federation of European Neuroscience Societies: 1896–1906. doi:10.1046/j.1460-9568.2003.02612.x. PMID 12752789. S2CID 24996193.
- Linthorst, Astrid C.E.; Peñalva, Rosana G.; Flachskamm, Cornelia; Holsboer, Florian; Reul, Johannes M. H. M. (December 2002). "Forced swim stress activates rat hippocampal serotonergic neurotransmission involving a corticotropinreleasing hormone receptor-dependent mechanism". European Journal of Neuroscience. 16 (12). Federation of European Neuroscience Societies: 2441–2452. doi:10.1046/j.1460-9568.2002.02400.x. PMID 12492439. S2CID 31630941.
- Linthorst, Astrid C. E.; Flachskamm, Cornelia; Barden, Nicholas; Holsboer, Florian; Reul, Johannes M. H. M. (January 2000). "Glucocorticoid receptor impairment alters CNS responses to a psychological stressor: an in vivo microdialysis study in transgenic mice". European Journal of Neuroscience. 12 (1): 283–291. doi:10.1046/j.1460-9568.2000.00878.x. PMID 10651883.
- Linthorst, Astrid C. E.; Karanth, Sharada; Barden, Nicholas; Florian, Holsboer; Reul, Johannes M. H. M. (January 1999). "Impaired glucocorticoid receptor function evolves in aberrant physiological responses to bacterial endotoxin". European Journal of Neuroscience. 11 (1): 178–186. doi:10.1046/j.1460-9568.1999.00425.x. PMID 9987022. S2CID 32436747.
- Linthorst, Astrid C. E.; Cornelia, Flachskamm; Hopkins, Stephen J.; Hoadley, Margaret E.; Labeur, Marta S.; Holsboer, Florian; Reul, Johannes M. H. M. (1 June 1997). "Long-term intracerebroventricular infusion of corticotropin-releasing hormone alters neuroendocrine, neurochemical, autonomic, behavioral, and cytokine responses to a systemic inflammatory challenge". The Journal of Neuroscience. 17 (11): 4448–4460. doi:10.1523/JNEUROSCI.17-11-04448.1997. PMC 6573557. PMID 9151762.
- Linthorst, Astrid C. E.; Flachskamm, Cornelia; Müller-Preuss, Peter; Holsboer, Florian; Reul, Johannes M. H. M. (April 1995). "Effect of bacterial endotoxin and interleukin-1ß on hippocampal serotonergic neurotransmission, behavioral activity and free corticosterone levels: an in vivo microdialysis study". The Journal of Neuroscience. 15 (4): 2920–2934. doi:10.1523/JNEUROSCI.15-04-02920.1995. PMC 6577745. PMID 7536823. S2CID 26121496.
- Linthorst, Astrid C. E.; Flachskamm, Cornelia; Holsboer, Florian; Reul, Johannes M. H. M. (August 1994). "Local administration of recombinant human interleukin-1ß in the rat hippocampus increases serotonergic neurotransmission, hypothalamic-pituitary-adrenocortical axis activity, and body temperature". Endocrinology. 135 (2): 520–532. doi:10.1210/endo.135.2.7518383. PMID 7518383.
