= Joan Venes =

American neurosurgeon

- Born: Joan Venes; June 27, 1935; Brooklyn, New York
- Died: March 31, 2010 (aged 74)
- Education: State University of New York; Yale University
- Occupation: Neurosurgeon
- Known for: Neurosurgery

Joan L. Venes was a neurosurgeon. She helped to develop the practice of neurosurgery in children.

== Early life ==
Venes was born on June 27, 1935. She was raised in a blue-collar neighborhood in Queens, New York. She was a first-generation American and the first person in her neighborhood to go to college.

== Education ==
Venes finished a degree in nursing in 1956. Two years later she began studying the courses that would enable her to enter medical school. In 1966, she graduated magna cum laude from the State University of New York, Downstate Medical Center. Next she did a surgical internship at Yale-New Haven Hospital. That was followed by a yearlong residency at Long Island Jewish Hospital. The next year was spent as a fellow in a neurosurgical laboratory at Yale University.

== Career ==
Venes joined the neurosurgery faculty at Yale, where she remained until 1978, when she left to join a private practice in Dallas. She was a van Wagenen fellow in 1973, spending her time at medical centers in order to understand the management of intracranial pressure and the techniques of intracranial pressure monitoring. The experience influenced much of her early clinical research.

While in private practice, she kept up her interest in the development of pediatric neurosurgery as a subspecialty. She was a charter member secretary of the American Society of Pediatric Neurosurgery (ASPEN). In 1981, she became chairman of the pediatric section of the American Association of Neurological Surgeons. She was also chairman of the subcommittee on Optimal Management of Congenital Lesions. In 1983, she was chairman of the ad hoc Committee on Special Certification for Pediatric Neurosurgery (ASPEN). She was the first woman inducted into the Society of Neurological Surgery, the first woman to serve as interim chair of a neurosurgical residency program, and the first woman to chair a joint section in the Society of Neurological Surgery.

Having been awarded a Pew Doctoral fellowship, Venes soon became a candidate for a Dr.P.H. in Health Policy. During this time she cut back on her private practice work.

In 1990, she was named professor of neurosurgery at the University of Michigan. That same year Venes became a Robert Wood Johnson Fellow in Health Policy. She finished the fellowship working on guidelines development at the Agency for Health Care Policy and Research.

At Yale, Venes was the first female neurosurgery resident. In 1974, Venes became the third woman diplomate of the American Board of Neurological Surgeons. Long a role model for women doctors, she was a founding member of the American Society of Pediatric Neurosurgeons.

Venes’ research dealt with laboratory and clinical work on shunt infection, intracranial pressure and monitoring, Reyes’ syndrome, tethered cord, craniofacial anomalies, and Chiari malformations. She wrote numerous articles and book chapters and gave many conference presentations on these topics.
