= Miriam B. Goodman =

American neuroscientist and biologist

- Education: Brown University; University of Chicago
- Scientific career
- Workplaces: Stanford University

Miriam B. Goodman is an American neuroscientist and biologist. She is currently the Mrs. George A. Winzer Professor of Cell Biology at Stanford University. At Stanford she is also Chair of Molecular and Cellular Physiology. Goodman's lab is currently working to develop a mechanistic model of sensation in C. elegans.

Goodman holds a Bachelor of Science in biochemistry from Brown University (1986) and a doctorate in Neurobiology from the University of Chicago (1995).

Goodman is a member of the Society for Neuroscience, Biophysical Society, and Genetics Society of America.
