= Victoria Luine =

American psychologist and neurochemist

Victoria Luine is an American psychologist and neurochemist, currently a distinguished professor at Hunter College of the City University of New York, and also a published author.
