= Linda Restifo =

Professor at the University of Arizona and member of the BIO5 Institute

Linda Lorelei Restifo
- Education: University of Pennsylvania
- Scientific career
- Fields: Neuroscience
- Workplaces: University of Arizona
- Thesis: Organization and transcriptional analysis of a developmentally regulated gene cluster in an ecdysterone-responsive puff site of Drosophila Melanogaster (1986)

Linda L. Restifo graduated from the University of Pennsylvania with an M.D. in 1984 and a Ph.D. in genetics in 1986. She is currently a professor at the University of Arizona of neuroscience, neurology, and cell biology, and she is a member of the BIO5 Institute. With her team, she works to understand normal brain development, moreover, the changes in that brain development that leads to cognitive disorders. She is known for her research into the brains of insects, particularly flies.
