= Hongkui Zeng =

Neuroscientist

- Education: B.S., Wuhan University; PhD, Brandeis University
- Known for: Cre mouse lines, large scale atlases of the mouse brain
- Scientific career
- Fields: Neuroscience
- Workplaces: Allen Institute for Brain Science
- Doctoral advisor: Michael Rosbash
- Other academic advisors: Susumu Tonegawa

Hongkui Zeng is the Director of the Allen Institute for Brain Science in Seattle, where she leads the creation of open-access datasets and tools to accelerate neuroscience discovery. In 2011-2014 Zeng led the team that created the Allen Mouse Brain Connectivity Atlas, which indicates which regions of the mouse brain are connected to which other regions. Since then, she has led the creation of atlases of neuronal cell types in the brain of humans and mice.

== Biography ==
Zeng received her Ph.D. in molecular and cell biology from Brandeis University, in the laboratory of Michael Rosbash, where she studied the molecular mechanisms of the circadian clock in fruit flies. Then as a postdoctoral fellow at Massachusetts Institute of Technology, in the laboratory of Susumu Tonegawa she studied the molecular and synaptic mechanisms underlying hippocampus-dependent plasticity and learning. She joined the Allen Institute for Brain Science in 2006.

At the Allen Institute, Zeng led the team that created the Allen Mouse Brain Connectivity Atlas, which indicates which regions of the mouse brain are connected to which other regions. The atlas was published in 2014. It was obtained by injecting the brains of living mice with viruses carrying the gene for the glowing marker green fluorescence protein (GFP). The neurons at each injection site accumulate GFP along their axons, and so point to the other neurons to which they are connected.

Zeng leads the creation of atlases of cell types in the brain of humans and mice. This work aims to have a systematic understanding of the common and unique properties for each of the brain's neural components - the different types of neuron; to monitor their activities during brain function; and to manipulate these neurons to investigate their function. To gain systematic understanding of the properties, interconnections and functions of these cell types, her team combines genetic tools with large-scale imaging and single-cell analysis technologies.

Hongkui Zeng joined the Allen Institute in 2006 and became Executive Vice President

In 2023, she earned the Pradel Research Award by the National Academy of Sciences and was elected as a member.
