= Jane Roskams =

Canadian neuroscientist

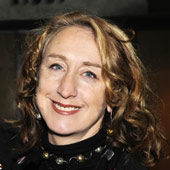
- Born: Douglas, Isle of Man
- Education: University College of Swansea, University of Idaho, Penn State School of Medicine, Johns Hopkins Medical Institutions
- Scientific career
- Fields: Neuroscience
- Workplaces: University of British Columbia, University of Washington

Angela Jane Roskams is a Professor emeritus at the University of British Columbia (UBC). She was professor at the Centre for Brain Health at UBC, and directed the laboratory of neural regeneration and brain repair, before winding down her lab in 2015–16 to become Executive Director of the Allen Institute for Brain Science, and a leader in the Open Science movement. After leading Strategy and Alliances for the Allen institute's multiple branches, she has become an influencer in the fields of neuroinformatics, public-private partnerships, and Open Data Sharing.

Roskams completed fellowships in neuropathology and neuroscience at Johns Hopkins Medical School, where she began research to analyze the mechanisms that drive successful regeneration in the olfactory system and underscore the early loss of brain function in Alzheimer's disease. This led her to research examining the interplay between genetics and the environment in shaping how cells in the nervous system develop and adapt across the lifespan, and test for key differences in mouse brain circuits.

Roskams currently directs analytics and training initiatives for the Canadian Open Neuroscience Platform (CONP), and is co-developer and co-PI of Mozak - an NIH funded online citizen science game-based approach to brain big data analytics. Her research is directed at best practices in large-scale data sharing, and the cross-testing of brain analytics platforms. She is leading the development of an online Global Training Space in brain data science in her work with the International Neuroinformatics Coordinating Facility (INCF), based at the Karolinska Institute in Stockholm. In addition to her work with the INCF, she is also an advisor to BrainMind and the XPrize, and a founding co-director of a digital health data company, Level42.ai.

== Early life and education ==
Roskams was born and raised on the Isle of Man. On July 5, 2017, her achievements in Science, and developing and promoting programs to enhance diversity in Science were recognized in the annual Tynwald Day Ceremony, by the Isle of Man Government. She attended the University College of Swansea, from which she graduated with a first class honours degree in biochemistry. A graduate scholarship took her to the United States to study journalism at the University of Idaho for her master's studies. Local reporting resulted in her being awarded a Sigma Delta Chi Award for science journalism. She completed her PhD in neuroscience at Penn State University in 1991.

She completed postdoctoral training fellowships in neuroscience and neuropathology at the National Institutes of Health and Johns Hopkins University School of Medicine, before taking up a professorial position at the University of British Columbia. In addition to her appointments in zoology (Faculty of Science) and psychiatry (Faculty of Medicine), Roskams is also a professor in the Dept of Neurosurgery at the University of Washington. Roskams also served as an associate dean.

== Research ==
Currently a recognized leader in Brain Big Data and Open Data sharing, Roskams previously made significant contributions to the field of regeneration and epigenetics, focusing on how cells interact during brain development. She researched how neural stem cells and specialized glia in the brain can aid in promoting nervous system development and repair. In 2008, she collaborated with the Allen Institute for Brain Science to bring together a group of experts to produce an annotated gene expression map of the spinal cord, which is now freely used by researchers across the world as a genetic map for discovery. Between 1999 and 2014, the Roskams Lab received more than $1.7 million in funding from the Canadian Institutes of Health Research. Her study of olfactory ensheathing glia has been funded by the Christopher and Dana Reeve Foundation.

In 2011, her lab identified radial glial cells in the periphery of the adult spinal cord. As of 2015, Roskams and the Allen Institute for Brain Science were working on a project known as BigNeuron. This effort joins computer programmers and scientists for "hackathons" in which participants test computer algorithms that could allow for the automated analysis of neurons. Dr Roskams is also the Co-developer of Mozak - a NSF/NIH-funded game-based approach to engaging "citizen scientists" in analyzing large-scale brain data, and currently leads analytics and training initiatives for the Canadian Open Neuroscience Platform (CONP). As a former advisor to the US BRAIN initiative and the Obama White House, she contributed to the development of the 21st Century Cures act, and served from 2014 to 2016 as an advisor to Governor Jay Inslee in Life Sciences and Global Health. In 2016, she then co-founded the non-profit Cascadia Data Innovations - catalyzing and enabling enhanced collaboration across the non-profit, academic and tech sectors in Seattle and Vancouver to tackle shared challenges in health big data. Roskams is on the founding executive of the Global Brain Consortium, and is actively engaged in advising a number of international projects fostering collaboration to drive discovery from shared brain data. An outspoken proponent of women in science, Roskams has received multiple recognitions for mentorship, and has served on advisories for the National Academy of Sciences in creating more optimal environments to enhance diversity in STEM, training the next generation of neuroscientists, and developing data sharing guidelines for funders of clinical research.

== Awards ==
In 2013, Roskams received the Bernice Grafstein Award for Outstanding Accomplishments in Mentoring from the Society for Neuroscience.

== Books and publications ==
She was the co-editor of "Genome Analysis: A Lab Manual" (ColdSpring Harbor Lab Press) the first definitive guide to analyzing multiple genomes, and Lab Ref, a how-to manual of basic research resources for scientists. That work has been reviewed in publications such as Biochemistry (Moscow) and the Journal of Cell Science. She has also been published in Glia, and in Brain Research. Roskams is on the editorial board of BrainFacts.org.
