= NSF Engineering Research Centers =

Engineering Research Centers (ERC) are university-led institutions developed through the National Science Foundation (NSF) Directorate of Engineering. While ERCs are initially funded by the NSF, they are expected to be self-sustaining within 10 years of being founded. The Engineering Research Centers program was originally developed in 1984 with the mission of removing disparity between academic and industrial engineering applications. In this way, engineering students would, theoretically, be better prepared to enter the engineering workforce. As a result, the United States would gain a competitive advantage over other countries. There have been three generations of Engineering Research Centers. Each of these generations has been specifically designed to meet the dynamic engineering demands of the United States. Due to the limited amount of funding available for ERCs, the program is competitive; out of 143 proposals submitted in 2008, only 5 were awarded centers. Commercialization of academic research is one of the primary goals of NSF ERCs.

== Generation one ==
The first generation of NSF ERCs began between 1985 and 1990 and encouraged academic institutions to focus education on manufacturing and commercial design. This first generation comprised 18 centers.

== Generation two ==
The National Science Foundation began funding the second generation of centers beginning in 1994 and continued until 2006. This second generation included 22 centers and was focused on manufacturing efficiency. Unlike the first generation of ERCs, the second generation encouraged multi-university partnerships and also focused on developing pre-college, engineering-bound students. In addition, the second generation of ERCs was designed to help academic research reach commercialization. However, unlike later generations, the second generation focused on domestic programs and largely ignored the potential in global partnerships.

== Generation three ==
Beginning in 2008, the NSF began accepting proposals for the third generation (Gen-3) of Engineering Research Centers. Gen-3 ERCs were largely created due to decreased student interest in sciences and engineering and an increasingly global economy. To meet these challenges, the Gen-3 ERCs were commissioned to increase interest in innovation and unify different engineering pipelines (i.e. domestic and international institutions, academic and commercial institutions). Gen-3 programs particularly focus on nanotechnology.

=== Partner structure ===
The mission of Gen-3 ERCs differs from the mission of the second generation ERCs in that Gen-3 centers embrace a global perspective. In creating the Gen-3 ERCs, the NSF recognized that streamlining existing processes is not enough to remain competitive in a global market. Instead, Gen-3 programs focus on also developing and globally commercializing novel engineering solutions. Like second generation ERCs, Gen-3 programs use a multi-university model and are required to include between 1 and 4 domestic partners. At least one of these partner universities must serve a large population of underrepresented groups. Gen-3 programs are also required to include between 1 and 3 non-domestic partners. Faculty from non-partner universities may become affiliated in order to fill "expertise gaps".

Above and beyond university partner requirements, Gen-3 ERCs are required to partner with domestic pre-college institutions, particularly local middle schools and high schools. ERCs must also have "industry/practitioner" members that pay fees to use ERC resources. These industry/practitioner members may include businesses and hospitals.

ERCs are required to support Research Experiences for Undergraduates, Research Experiences for Teachers, and pre-college (Young Scholars) summer research programs. In addition, ERCs partner with local K-12 institutions to increase the abilities of science and engineering educators. Because of the global focus of Gen-3 ERCs, centers often host foreign exchange students.

=== Funding structure ===
Funding for an ERC may not exceed $3,250,000 for the first year, but this limit increases by $250,000 per year until it reaches a maximum of $4,000,000. The NSF committed enough funds ($9,750,000) to support three new centers beginning in the summer of 2012. Corporate partners are permitted to supplement this funding, and their contributions can be quite significant. For example, in 2006, over 50 organizations invested in the Engineering Research Center for Compact and Efficient Fluid Power (CEFP) and added approximately $3 million to the CEFP's budget. In some circumstances, ERCs obtain additional funding through other governmental agencies.

== Current centers ==
Currently, 18 ERCs are supported by the National Science Foundation. These centers are listed below along with the years during which they were founded. Programs founded before 2008 are second generation programs; programs founded in or after 2008 are Gen-3 programs.

=== Manufacturing ===
Center	Lead Institution	Year founded
ERC for Compact and Efficient Fluid Power (CCEFP)	University of Minnesota	2006
ERC for Structured Organic Particulate Systems, (C-SOPS)	Rutgers University	2006
Synthetic Biology ERC (SynBERC)	University of California at Berkeley	2006
Center for Biorenewable Chemicals (CBiRC)	Iowa State University	2008

=== Biotechnology and health care ===
Center	Lead Institution	Year founded
Biomimetic MicroElectronic Systems (BMES) ERC	University of Southern California	2003
Quality of Life ERC (QoLT)	Carnegie Mellon University	2006
ERC for Revolutionizing Metallic Biomaterials (RMB)	North Carolina A&T University	2008
Engineering Research Center for Sensorimotor Neural Engineering (CSNE)	University of Washington	2011
Center for Precise Advanced Technologies and Health Systems for Underserved Populations (PATHS-UP)	Texas A&M	2017
Engineering Research Center for Advanced Technologies for Preservation of Biological Systems (ATP-Bio)	University of Minnesota	2020

=== Energy, sustainability, and infrastructure ===
Center	Lead Institution	Year founded
Future Renewable Electric Energy Delivery and Management (FREEDM) Systems Center	North Carolina State University	2008
Smart Lighting ERC	Rensselaer Polytechnic Institute	2008
ERC for Quantum Energy and Sustainable Solar Technologies (QESST)	Arizona State University	2011
ERC for Re-Inventing America’s Urban Water Infrastructure (ReNUWIt)	Stanford University	2011
ERC for Ultra-wide Area Resilient Electric Energy Transmission Networks (CURENT)	University of Tennessee–Knoxville	2011

=== Microelectronics, sensing, and information technology ===
Center	Lead Institution	Year founded
ERC for Power Optimization for Electro-Thermal Systems (POETS)	University of Illinois at Urbana-Champaign / University of Arkansas / Stanford University / Howard University	2015
ERC for Collaborative Adaptive Sensing of the Atmosphere (CASA)	University of Massachusetts Amherst	2003
ERC for Extreme Ultraviolet Science and Technology (EUV ERC)	Colorado State University / University of Colorado at Boulder / University of California at Berkeley / Lawrence Berkeley National Laboratory	2003
ERC on Mid-Infrared Technologies for Health and the Environment (MIRTHE)	Princeton University	2006
Center for Integrated Access Networks (CIAN)	University of Arizona	2008

== Past (graduated) centers ==
The following centers no longer receive funding from the National Science Foundation. Centers founded in or after 1994 are second generation ERCs. Centers founded before 1994 are first generation.

=== Manufacturing ===
Center	Lead Institution	Year founded	Year of Graduation
ERC for Intelligent Manufacturing Systems	Purdue University	1985/1994	1999
Systems Research Center	University of Maryland	1985/1994	1997
Engineering Design Research Center	Carnegie Mellon University	1986	1997
ERC for Net Shape Manufacturing	Ohio State University	1986	1997
Center for Interfacial Engineering	University of Minnesota	1988	1999
Particle Engineering Research Center	University of Florida	1995	2006
ERC for Environmentally Benign Semiconductor Manufacturing	University of Arizona	1996	2006
ERC for Reconfigurable Manufacturing Systems	University of Michigan	1996	2007
Center for Advanced Engineering of Fibers and Films	Clemson University	1998	2008
Gordon ERC for Subsurface Sensing and Imaging Systems	Northeastern University	2000	2010
ERC for Wireless Integrated MicroSystems	University of Michigan	2000	2010

=== Biotechnology and health care ===
Center	Lead Institution	Year founded	Year of Graduation
Emerging Cardiovascular Technologies	Duke University	1987	1998
Biotechnology Process Engineering Center	Massachusetts Institute of Technology	1985/1995	2005
Center for Biofilm Engineering	Montana State University	1990	2001
Engineered Biomaterials ERC	University of Washington	1996	2007
ERC for Computer-Integrated Surgical Systems and Technology	Johns Hopkins University	1998	2008
ERC for the Engineering of Living Tissues	Georgia Institute of Technology	1998	2008
VaNTH ERC for Bioengineering Educational Technologies	Vanderbilt University	1999	2007

=== Energy, sustainability, and infrastructure ===
Center	Lead Institution	Year founded	Year of Graduation
Advanced Combustion Engineering Research Center	Brigham Young University/University of Utah	1986	1997
ERC for Advanced Technology for Large Structural Systems	Lehigh University	1986	1997
Mid-America Earthquake Center	University of Illinois at Urbana-Champaign	1997	2007
Multidisciplinary Center for Earthquake Engineering Research	The University at Buffalo	1997	2007
Pacific Earthquake Engineering Research Center	University of California at Berkeley	1997	2007
Offshore Technology Research Center	Texas A&M/University of Texas	1988	1999

=== Microelectronics, sensing, and information technology ===
ERC	Lead Institution	Year founded	Year of Graduation
Industrial Research through various research tools	Grian Technologies Pvt Ltd	2003	2003
ERC for Compound Semiconductor Microelectronics	University of Illinois	1986	1997
Data Storage Systems Center	Carnegie Mellon University	1990	2001
ERC for Computational Field Simulation	Mississippi State University	1990	2001
ERC for Neuromorphic Systems Engineering	California Institute of Technology	1995	2006
Microelectronics Packaging Research Center	Georgia Institute of Technology	1994	2006
Integrated Media Systems Center	University of Southern California	1996	2007
ERC for Power Electronics Systems	Virginia Polytechnic Institute and State University	1998	2008
