= Candan Tamerler =

Turkish-American bioengineer and materials scientist

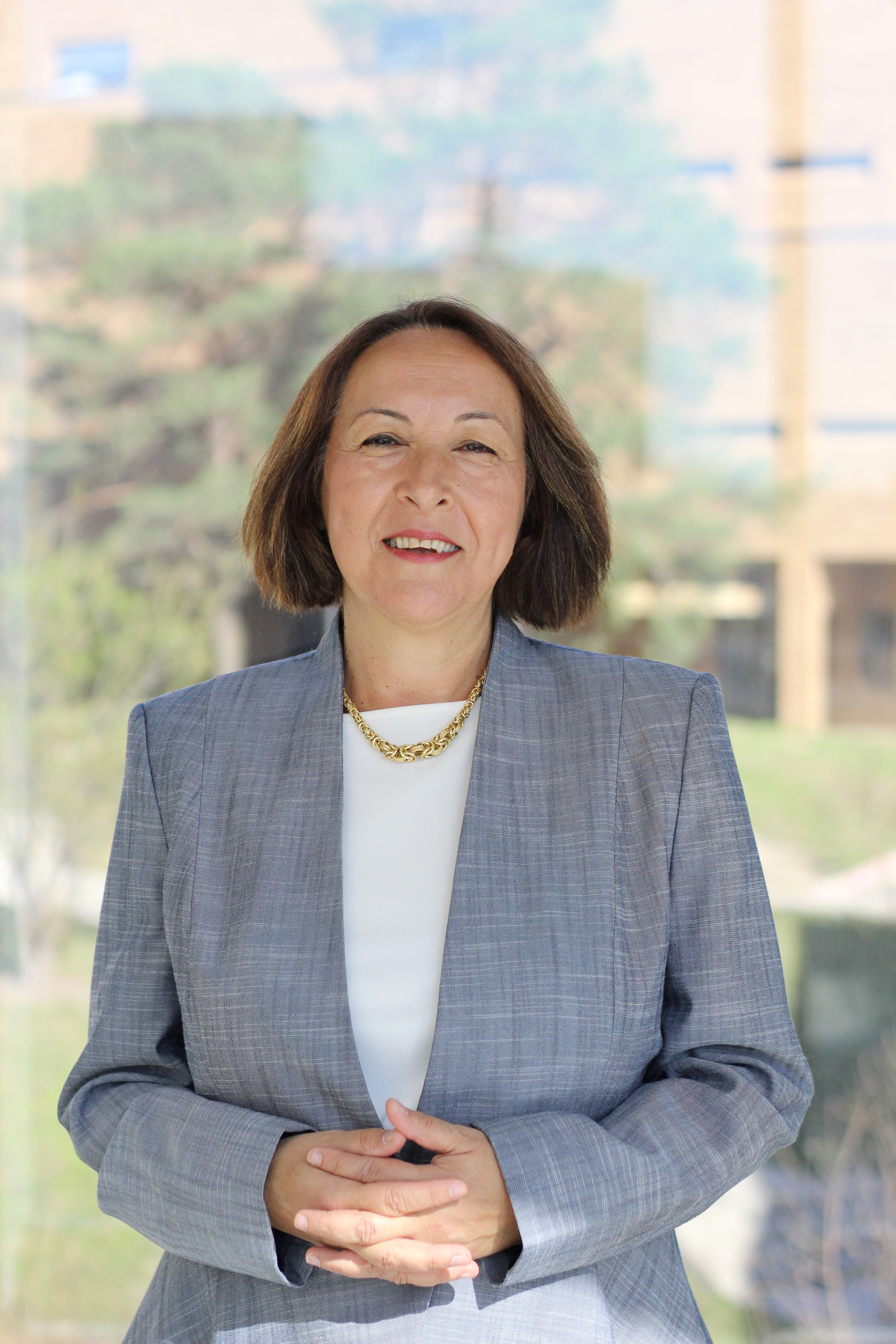
- Tamerler at the University of Kansas
- Born: Fatih, Istanbul, Turkey
- Known for: Scientific contributions to biomimetics, the design of biomolecular recognition based self-assembled and self-organized hybrid-nanomaterials, bio-nanotechnology
- Awards: AAAS Fellow (2018); AIMBE Fellow (2015); Turkish Academy of Sciences (2012)

Academic background
- Education: Boğaziçi University (BS, MSc, PhD)
- Website: me.ku.edu/people/candan-tamerler

Candan Tamerler is a Turkish-American bioengineer and materials scientist. She was born in the Fatih district of Istanbul, located on the old city historic peninsula in Turkey. She is the Charles E. & Mary Jane Spahr Professor in the Department of Mechanical Engineering and the Bioengineering Program at the University of Kansas, where she also serves as Associate Vice Chancellor for Research. Her research focuses on biomimetics, biointerfaces, biohybrid systems, bio-enabled materials, and tissue engineering.

== Education ==
Tamerler earned her B.Sc. (1989), M.Sc. (1991), and Ph.D. (1997) in Chemical engineering from Boğaziçi University.

She was a postdoctoral researcher at the Molecular and Applied Biosciences, University of Westminster, London, UK, from January 1997 to August 1999. During her education she received advanced training through several international fellowships and programs, including the International Centre for Genetic Engineering and Biotechnology (ICGEB) fellowship on “Bacterial Genetics” (Trieste, Italy), NATO-ASI Summer School on “Protein Structure, Function & Design” (Spetses, Greece), European MED-Campus Program on “Downstream Processing” (Ege University, İzmir, Türkiye), European MED-Campus Program on “Design of Bioreactors” (INETI, Lisbon, Portugal), and FASEB Summer Research Conference (Vermont Academy, USA).

== Career ==
Tamerler began her academic career in August 1999 as assistant professor in the Molecular Biology and Genetics Department at Istanbul Technical University. She received tenure and was promoted to associate professor in 2002 and to full professor in 2007. She served as chair of the department from 2002 to 2010 and was the founding director of the Dr. Orhan Ocalgiray Molecular Biology-Biotechnology and Genetics Research Centre (MOBGAM), established in 2004 to bridge biological sciences and engineering.

In 2010 she joined the University of Washington as research professor in the Department of Materials science and engineering and served as assistant director of the Genetically Engineered Materials Science & Engineering Center (GEMSEC), an NSF-MRSEC. She had been a visiting professor since 2002 and a founding core investigator of GEMSEC in 2005 and later served as the Assistant Director of the center. She remains an affiliate professor in the department.

She moved to the University of Kansas in 2013 as the Wesley G. Cramer Associate Professor in Mechanical Engineering. She was later promoted to full professor and named the Charles E. & Mary Jane Spahr Professor. She served as Associate Dean for Research in the School of Engineering (2019-2022) and has been Associate Vice Chancellor for Research since 2022. She is Track Director for Biomaterials and Tissue Engineering in the Bioengineering Program and director of the Biomimetic and Bioenabled Materials Lab.

== Research ==
Tamerler is recognized among the early pioneers in molecular biomimetics. Her group was among the first to use phage display and combinatorial biology techniques to select material-specific peptides (known as genetically engineered peptides for inorganics or solid-binding peptides) for a wide range of technological materials.

She developed unique foundational approaches in transferring biological materials principles to biomimetic- and bioactive-biomaterials design and adapted multi-modal interpretable machine learning approaches in biointerface engineering to couple with biological function. Her research interests evolved from recombinant biotechnology (producing proteins and secondary metabolites) and polysaccharides as delivery systems towards biohybrid materials and systems integrated with designer peptides and proteins inspired by nature. Her work merged combinatorial biology-based principles to peptide engineering to develop peptides that specifically bind to materials and to utilize these peptides in self-assembly or self-organizing biomimetic systems.

Her research expanded to understand, engineer, and control peptide-material interactions and exploit them as new tools to tailor novel materials and systems for practical applications. Tamerler's research involves the design of biomolecular materials, peptide-polymer hybrid adhesives, and biointerfaces for applications in bioactive functionalization of medical devices, drug delivery systems, oral health, catalysis and sustainable engineering. She has several patents and more than 200 publications.

== Recognition and awards ==
- Elected Full Member of the Turkish Academy of Sciences (2012)
- Elected Fellow of the American Institute for Medical and Biological Engineering (2015), "For scientific contributions to the design of biomolecular recognition based self-assembled and self-organized hybrid-nanomaterials, to bio-nanotechnology and next generation biomaterials"
- Elected Fellow of the American Association for the Advancement of Science (2018), "for distinguished contributions to bio-enabled approaches for the development of regenerative biomaterials and leadership in the engineering of peptides and proteins to modulate materials/tissue interfacial reactions"
- TMS Functional Materials Division Distinguished Scientist/Engineer Award (2023), "for her pioneering contributions to biomimetics and bio-enabled materials science and engineering, and her outstanding mentorship of next-generation materials scientists"

Tamerler served as President of the Turkish American Scientists and Scholars Association (TASSA) from 2019 to 2023.

== Selected publications ==
- Sarikaya, M.; Tamerler, C.; Jen, A. K.-Y.; Schulten, K.; Baneyx, F. (2003). "Molecular biomimetics: nanotechnology through biology". Nature Materials. 2 (9): 577–585. doi:10.1038/nmat964. PMID 12951599.
- Cetinel, S.; Caliskan, H.B.; Yucesoy, D.T.; Donatan, A.S.; Yuca, E.; Urgen, M.; Karaguler, N.G.; Tamerler, C. (2013). "Addressable self-immobilization of lactate dehydrogenase across multiple length scales". Biotechnology Journal. 8: 262–272. doi:10.1002/biot.201100502.
- Xie, SX; Song, L; Yuca, E; Boone, K; Sarikaya, R; VanOosten, SK; Misra, A; Ye, Q; Spencer, P; Tamerler, C (2020). "Antimicrobial peptide-polymer conjugates for dentistry". ACS Applied Polymer Materials. 2 (3): 1134–44. doi:10.1021/acsapm.9b00921. PMC 8026165.
- Yazici, H.; O’Neill, M. B.; Kacar, T.; Wilson, B. R.; Oren, E. E.; Sarikaya, M.; Tamerler, C. (2016). "Engineered Chimeric Peptides as Antimicrobial Surface Coating Agents toward Infection-Free Implants". ACS Applied Materials & Interfaces. 8 (8): 5070–5081. doi:10.1021/acsami.5b03697. PMC 5310947.
- Boone, K.; Wisdom, C.; Camarda, K.; Spencer, P.; Tamerler, C. (2021). "Combining genetic algorithm with machine learning strategies for designing potent antimicrobial peptides". BMC Bioinformatics. 22: 239. doi:10.1186/s12859-021-04156-x. PMC 8111958.

=== Additional selected works ===
- Tamerler, C.; Ullah, M.; Adlard, M. W.; Keshavarz, T. (1997). "Effect of pH on physiology of Metarhizium anisopliae for production of swainsonine". FEMS Microbiology Letters. 168 (1): 17–23. doi:10.1111/j.1574-6968.1998.tb13249.x.
- Tamerler, C.; Keshavarz, T. (2000). "Lipolytic enzyme production in batch and fed-batch cultures of Ophiostoma piceae and Fusarium oxysporum". Journal of Chemical Technology & Biotechnology. 75 (9): 785–790. doi:10.1002/1097-4660(200009)75:9<785::AID-JCTB293>3.0.CO;2-R.
- Zhang, S.; Karaca, B. T.; VanOosten, S. K.; Yuca, E.; Mahalingam, S.; Edirisinghe, M.; Tamerler, C. (2015). "Coupling Infusion and Gyration for the Nanoscale Assembly of Functional Polymer Nanofibers Integrated with Genetically Engineered Proteins". Macromolecular Rapid Communications. 36 (14): 1322–1328. doi:10.1002/marc.201500174. PMC 5215549.
- Kara, S.; Tamerler, C.; Bermek, H.; Pekcan, Ö. (2003). "Cation effects on sol-gel and gel-sol phase transitions of κ-carrageenan-water system". International Journal of Biological Macromolecules. 31 (4–5): 177–185. doi:10.1016/S0141-8130(02)00080-6.
