= Allen Institute =

American medical institution

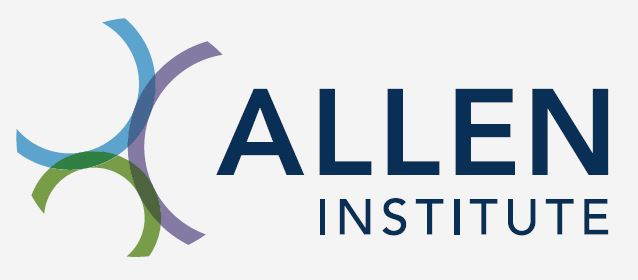
- Formation: 2003; 23 years ago
- Founders: Paul Allen, Jody Allen
- Type: Independent, nonprofit medical research organization (IRS exemption status): 501(c)(3)
- Tax ID no.: 91-2155317
- Purpose: Basic science research in neuroscience, cell biology, immunology
- Headquarters: Seattle, Washington, United States
- Region served: Worldwide
- Key people: Paul Allen, founder Jody Allen, founder, Rui Costa, D.V.M., Ph.D., CEO
- Employees: ~825
- Website: www.alleninstitute.org

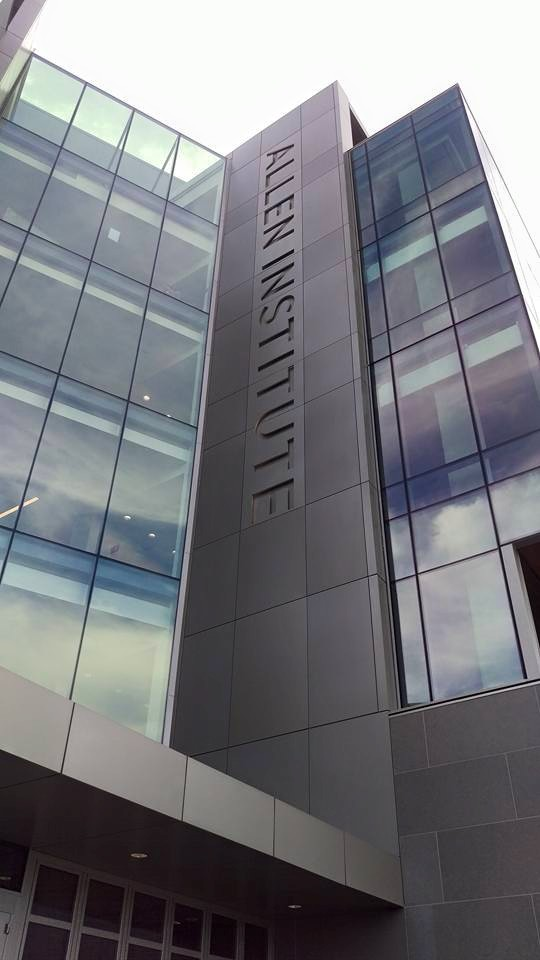
Entryway to the Allen Institute building in Seattle, Washington

The Allen Institute is a non-profit, bioscience research institute located in Seattle. It was founded by billionaire philanthropist Paul G. Allen in 2003. The Allen Institute conducts large-scale basic science research studying the brain, cells and immune system in an effort to accelerate science and disease research. The organization practices open science, in that they make all their data and resources publicly available for researchers to access.

== Scientific focus ==
The Allen Institute's research is focused on neuroscience, through the Allen Institute for Brain Science, founded in 2003, Allen Institute for Neural Dynamics, founded in 2021; cell biology, through the Allen Institute for Cell Science, founded in 2014; broad areas of bioscience and medical research, through The Paul G. Allen Frontiers Group, founded in 2016; and human immunology, through the Allen Institute for Immunology, founded in 2018. The Paul G. Allen Frontiers Group recommends research funding to scientific investigators outside the Allen Institute, while the other three divisions conduct research in-house.

=== Allen Institute for Brain Science ===
The Allen Institute for Brain Science launched with an initial single scientific project, the Allen Mouse Brain Atlas, which aimed to map gene expression across the entire mouse brain. The publication describing that project, published in 2007, has been cited more than 1,800 times. The Allen Institute for Brain Science has since generated several other large-scale neuroscience projects, focusing on both the mouse and human brains in health and disease. Its most recent open-source projects focus on defining brain cell types in the healthy mouse and human brains through multimodal characterization of neurons and other brain cells, including their connectivity, electrophysiology, morphology and transcriptomic profiles; and on the cellular level of activity in the mouse visual cortex through the Allen Brain Observatory. In 2020, the National Institutes of Health awarded $40.5 million to launch a new research center headquartered at the Allen Institute focused on brain cell types in Alzheimer's disease.

=== Allen Institute for Cell Science ===
The Allen Institute for Cell Science was modeled on the Allen Institute for Brain Science and was launched to capture a global view of human cells. The focus of the institute will be "How does information encoded in our genes become living cells, and what goes wrong when a disease affects those cells?" Research includes developing gene-edited, fluorescently tagged human induced pluripotent stem cells that form the backbone of an openly available library of digital microscopy images and computational models to predict cellular organization. The tagged cell lines are available for others in the scientific community to use, and have been used in research on kidney disease and cardiomyocyte function, among others. Ongoing projects at the institute include studies of cardiomyocyte differentiation and mitosis. Cell biology resources from the institute have been used in high school and college biology education, including at Washington State University.

The inaugural executive director for the institute was Rick Horwitz, formerly of the University of Virginia. Notable scientists include Joan Brugge and Julie Theriot.

=== The Paul G. Allen Frontiers Group ===
The Paul G. Allen Frontiers Group recommends research funding from the Paul G. Allen Family Foundation to support bioscience and biomedical research. Projects supported by Frontiers Group awards include research on regeneration, gene drives, and human brain evolution, among many others. The Frontiers Group directs research support through two primary award mechanisms: Allen Distinguished Investigator awards, which are typically three-year, $1.5 million awards given to one or a small set of researchers, and Allen Discovery Center awards, which are larger grants given to launch new research centers. To date, four Allen Discovery Centers have been launched.

=== Allen Institute for Immunology ===
The Allen Institute for Immunology, was launched with a $125 million donation from Paul G. Allen two months after Allen's death. The Allen Institute for Immunology's initial research focus is on the healthy human immune system and on changes in the immune system in two cancers, multiple myeloma and melanoma, and in three autoimmune diseases, inflammatory bowel disease, Crohn's disease and ulcerative colitis. The institute does not conduct clinical research, but rather partners with existing clinical research groups at other organizations who collaborate on research and provide patient samples; the institute's research partners are the Benaroya Research Institute at Virginia Mason, Fred Hutchinson Cancer Research Center, the University of California San Diego with the University of Colorado Anschutz Medical Campus, and the University of Pennsylvania. The institute's executive vice president and director is Susan Kaech, Ph.D.

=== Allen Institute for Neural Dynamics ===
The Allen Institute for Neural Dynamics was launched in November 2021, with a mission to study the neural circuits that support complex behavior. The institute is led by executive vice president Karel Svoboda.

== Scientific approach ==
The Allen Institute employs three core principles that distinguish it from traditional academic laboratory and industry organization settings. Their large-scale, data-rich "big science" projects aim to answer fundamental questions of biology. Cross-functional groups of employees with differing specialties work together in a collaborative "team science" environment. All data and resources generated within the Institute are made publicly available as part of their "open science" model. Notable public resources include the Allen Mouse Brain and Human Brain Atlases.

== Board of directors ==
The Allen Institute Board of Directors is chaired by Jody Allen. Other current board members are Margaret Anderson, Joanne Berger-Sweeney, Ph.D., Phyllis J. Campbell, Alta Charo, J.D., Thomas L Daniel, Ph.D., Carla DewBerry, Steve Hall, Allan Jones, Ph.D., and Michael Stryker, Ph.D.

== Accomplishments ==
- Allen Institute for Brain Science researchers collaborated with a research team from the University of Szeged to identify and name a newly discovered type of human neuron, the rosehip neuron, which is not found in mice. The function of the rosehip neuron is as yet unclear.
- In 2020, Allen Institute for Brain Science researchers reported the first electrical recordings from human von Economo neurons.

== Collaborations ==
The Allen Institute for Brain Science is part of the MICrONS program, which is funded by IARPA. The research collaboration aims to map all the synapses in one cubic millimeter of the mouse brain, the largest such connectomics project to date.

The Allen Institute for Brain Science hosts the BRAIN Initiative Cell Census Network, or BICCN, web data portal. This collaborative effort, funded by the National Institutes of Health, aims to create comprehensive catalogs of brain cell types from mouse, human and monkeys.

== Headquarters ==
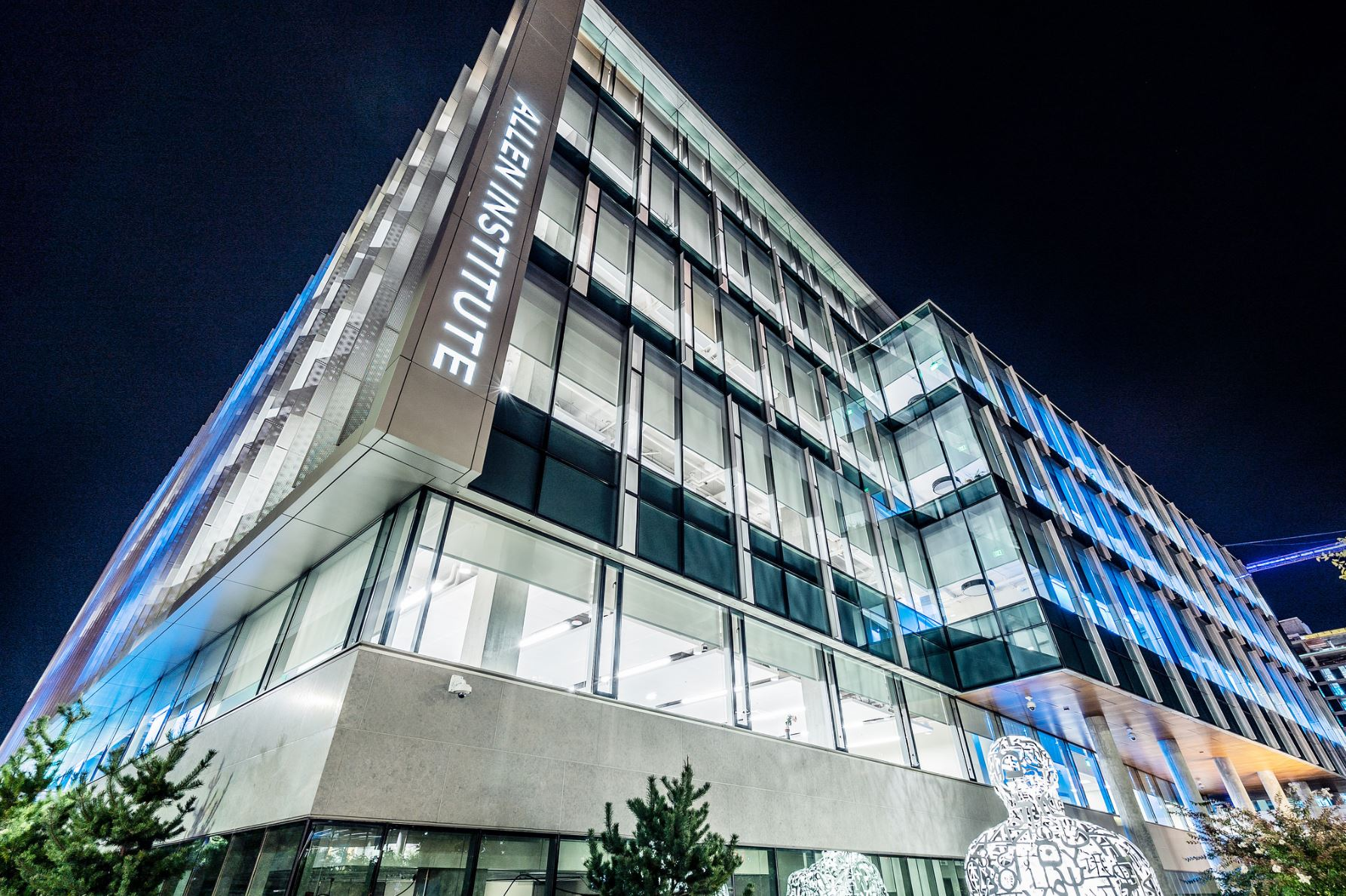
Allen Institute Headquarters

The Allen Institute is located in the South Lake Union neighborhood of Seattle, Washington and houses the Allen Institute for Brain Science, the Allen Institute for Cell Science, the Allen Institute for Immunology, and the Paul G. Allen Frontiers Group. The architects of the building were Perkins + Will and construction was conducted by GLY. It is a LEED-Gold certified green building. The building is located at 615 Westlake Ave N and was dedicated on December 4, 2015, and was a runner up for building of the year by the Seattle Daily Journal of Commerce.

To help facilitate their collaborative team science approach, the six-story building was designed around a central atrium, alternating laboratories with traditional and flexible meeting spaces throughout. The building also includes an auditorium were multiple public events and symposia are held.

The location of the Allen Institute was home to the historic McKay Ford and Pacific auto dealer, built in the early 1920s. During construction the 2,760 piece terra cotta façade was removed and reinstalled upon completion of the building. It houses a craft beer hall with mini golf and other games.

Jaume Plensa's sculpture Mirall was installed outside the building in October 2015. The art work features two large figures, each about 12 feet tall (3.6 metres).

== See also ==
- Allen Institute for Cell Science
- Allen Institute for Brain Science
- Allen Institute for AI
- Big Science
- Open Science
- Paul Allen
