= Small nucleolar RNA MBI-161 =

Small nucleolar RNA SNORA31
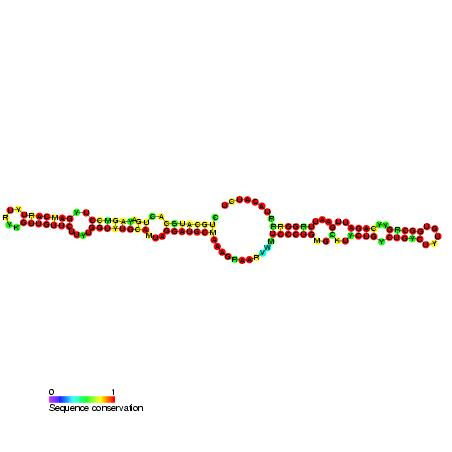
- Predicted secondary structure and sequence conservation of SNORA31

Identifiers
- Symbol: SNORA31
- Alt. Symbols: snoMBI-161
- Rfam: RF00322

Other data
- RNA type: Gene; snRNA; snoRNA; H/ACA-box
- Domain: Eukaryota
- GO: GO:0006396 GO:0005730
- SO: SO:0000594
- PDB structures: PDBe

In molecular biology, the Small nucleolar RNA MBI-161 is a non-coding RNA (ncRNA) molecule which functions in the biogenesis (modification) of other small nuclear RNAs (snRNAs). This type of modifying RNA is located in the nucleolus of the eukaryotic cell which is a major site of snRNA biogenesis. It is known as a small nucleolar RNA (snoRNA) and also often referred to as a "guide RNA".

snoRNA MBI-161 was originally cloned from mouse brain tissues and belongs to the H/ACA box class of snoRNAs as it has the predicted hairpin-hinge-hairpin-tail structure and has the conserved H/ACA-box motifs.
