= CKR =

CKR may refer to:

- Colin Kazim-Richards, a professional footballer
- Central Kansas Railway, a short-line railroad
- Central Kowloon Route, a road project in Kowloon, Hong Kong
- Kairak language, the ISO 639-3 code ckr
- Cikarang railway station, the station code CKR
- Chakragati mouse, an insertional transgenic mouse mutant of species Mus musculus
