= Adrienne Fairhall =

Neuroscientist

- Education: Australian National University, Weizmann Institute of Science
- Known for: Dynamic Neural Computation; Circuit Dynamics; Neural Coding
- Awards: Allen Distinguished Investigator; Burroughs-Wellcome Fellow; McKnight Scholar; Sloan Fellow; Fulbright-Tocqueville Distinguished Chair
- Scientific career
- Fields: Theoretical Neuroscience
- Workplaces: University of Washington
- Doctoral advisor: Itamar Procaccia

Adrienne Fairhall is a university professor in the Department of Physiology and Biophysics and an adjunct professor in the Departments of Physics and Applied Mathematics, as well as the director of the Computational Neuroscience Program at the University of Washington.

Fairhall is primarily known for her work on dynamic neural computation, particularly the interplay between cellular and circuit dynamics and coding, and she has received numerous awards for her work in the field including a Sloan Fellowship, a McKnight Scholar Award, a Burroughs-Wellcome Careers at the Scientific Interface Fellowship, and an Allen Distinguished Investigator award. In 2022, she was a Fulbright-Tocqueville Distinguished Chair at the Ecole Normale Superieure in Paris.

Fairhall leads a theory group at the University of Washington.

== Early life and education ==
Fairhall was raised in Australia, where she obtained her honors degree in theoretical physics working with Robert Dewar at the Australian National University in Canberra, Australia. She then joined the lab of Itamar Procaccia at the Weizmann Institute of Science where she completed a master's degree and PhD in physics.

== Career ==
Fairhall held postdoctoral positions at the NEC Corporation with William Bialek and in Princeton University's Department of Molecular Biology before being appointed as an assistant professor at the University of Washington's Department of Physiology and Biophysics in 2004, where she is now a full professor. She serves as the co-director of the University of Washington Computational Neuroscience Program and previously as co-director of the University of Washington Institute for Neuroengineering

Fairhall has also been involved in a number of computational neuroscience educational programs and workshops; she directed the Methods in Computational Neuroscience course at the Marine Biological Laboratory in Woods Hole, co-founded the Summer Workshop for the Dynamic Brain, a summer course in collaboration with the Allen Institute on Friday Harbor, and with Rajesh Rao, co-created a Coursera course on computational neuroscience.

== Personal life ==
Fairhall is married to Blaise Agüera y Arcas, whom she met at the Methods in Computational Neuroscience summer course at the Marine Biological Laboratory in Woods Hole and with whom she has two children.

== Select publications ==
- Fairhall, A.L.; Lewen, G.D.; Bialek, W.; de Ruyter van Steveninck, R.R. (23 August 2001). "Efficiency and ambiguity in an adaptive neural code". Nature. 412 (6849): 787–792. Bibcode:2001Natur.412..787F. doi:10.1038/35090500. PMID 11518957. S2CID 4354013.
- Lundstrom, B.N.; Higgs, M.H.; Spain, W.J.; Fairhall, A.L. (19 October 2008). "Fractional differentiation by neocortical pyramidal neurons". Nature Neuroscience. 11 (11): 1335–1342. doi:10.1038/nn.2212. PMC 2596753. PMID 18931665.
- Fairhall, A.L.; Burlingame, C.A.; Narasimhan, R.; Harris, R.A.; Puchalla, J.L.; Berry, M.J. (5 November 2006). "Selectivity for Multiple Stimulus Features in Retinal Ganglion Cells". Journal of Neurophysiology. 96 (5): 2724–2738. doi:10.1152/jn.00995.2005. PMID 16914609. S2CID 52872206.

== Awards and honors ==
- University Medal, Australian National University
- Zonta International Amelia Earhart Award
- Sloan Fellowship
- McKnight Fellowship
- Burroughs Wellcome CASI Fellowship
- Allen Distinguished Investigator
- Biophysical Society Margaret Oakley Dayhoff Award
- Fulbright-Tocqueville Distinguished Chair
