= Rajesh P. N. Rao =

Indian academic

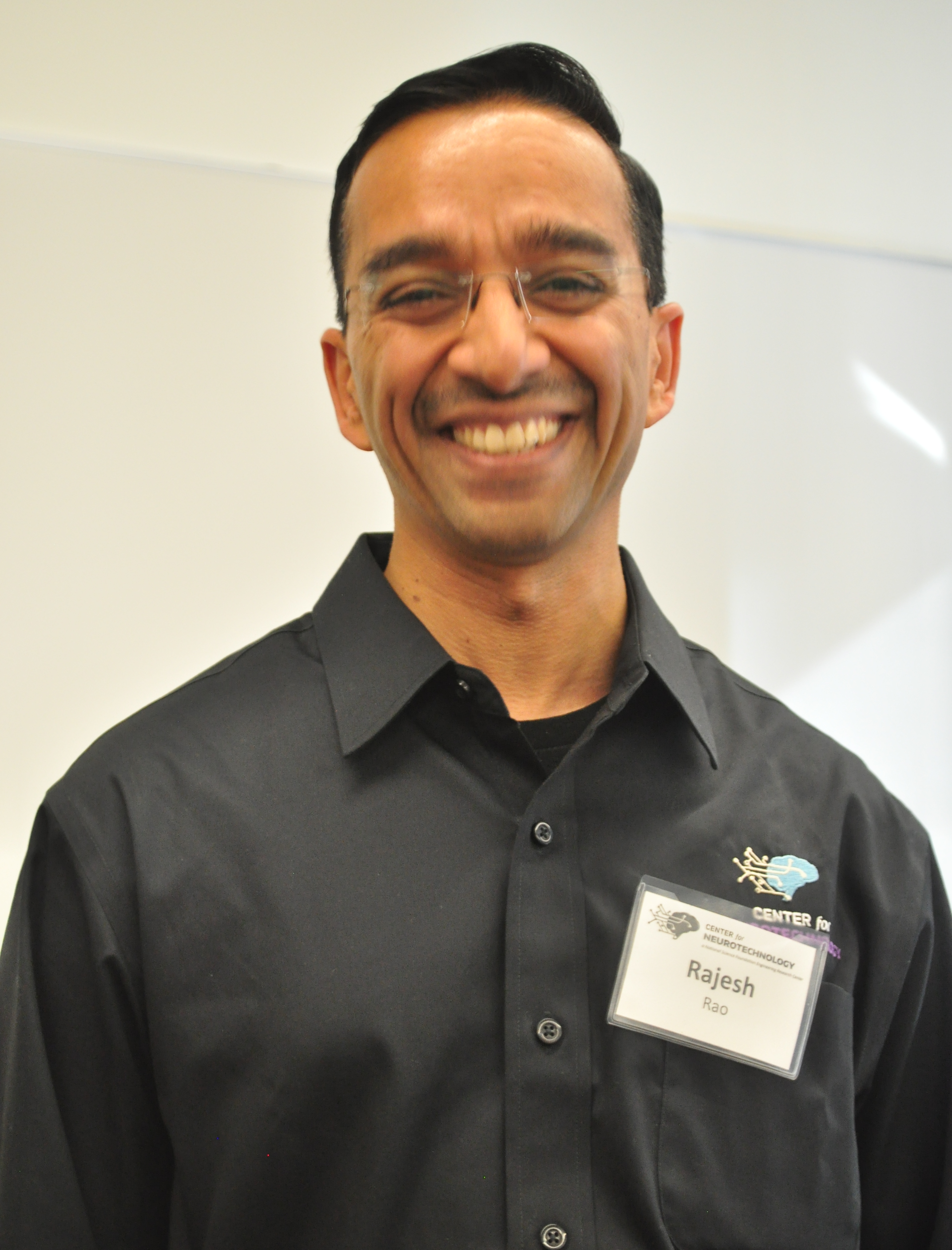
Rajesh Rao, 2019

Rajesh P. N. Rao (born 2 July 1970 in Madras, India) is the Director of the Center for Neurotechnology (CNT) and the Cherng Jia and Elizabeth Yun Hwang Professor of Computer Science and Engineering and Electrical and Computer Engineering at the University of Washington in Seattle.

Dr. Rao is a researcher in the fields of computational neuroscience, artificial intelligence, and brain-computer interfacing. With Dana Ballard, he proposed the predictive coding model of brain function in 1999. He has contributed to Bayesian models of perception and decision making. In brain-computer interfacing, Prof. Rao and his collaborators were the first to demonstrate direct brain control of a humanoid robot in 2007.

In the first demonstration of human brain-to-brain communication in August 2013, Rao wearing an electrical brain-signal reading cap triggered the movement of his colleague Andrea Stocco's hand via the Internet, allowing their brains to cooperate to solve a computer game. The demonstration was subsequently replicated across other pairs of humans, and extended to other tasks, and to a BrainNet for more than two brains.

Rao also works on the decipherment of the Indus script. By comparing the entropy of the Indus script with entropies of linguistic scripts such as those for Sumerian and Old Tamil, and nonlinguistic sequences such as DNA and a programming language, his work suggested that the Indus script behaves more like a linguistic script than nonlinguistic sequences. He has also given a TED talk on this topic where he presented his entropy analysis of the script and reviewed the Dravidian hypothesis put forward by Iravatham Mahadevan and Asko Parpola.

Rao is the author of the book Brain-Computer Interfacing (Cambridge University Press, 2013) and co-editor of two volumes, Probabilistic Models of the Brain (MIT Press, 2002) and Bayesian Brain (MIT Press, 2007). He has given a TEDx talk on "Brain co-processors: When AI meets the Brain."

With Prof. Adrienne Fairhall, Rao offered the first massive open online course in computational neuroscience in 2013. The course continues to be offered on Coursera.

Rao graduated summa cum laude from Angelo State University in 1992 with a B.S. degree in Computer Science/Mathematics. He then attended the University of Rochester where he earned his Master's degree (1994) and Ph.D. (1998) in Computer Science. He was a Sloan Postdoctoral Fellow at the Salk Institute for Biological Studies before joining the University of Washington faculty in 2000.

== Awards ==
- Sloan Faculty Fellowship, 2001
- Packard Fellowship for Science and Engineering, 2002
- NSF CAREER Award 2002
- ONR Young Investigator Award, 2003
- Guggenheim Fellowship 2016
