= Thomas Daniel (biologist) =

American biologist

Thomas L. Daniel
- Born: 1954 (age 71–72)
- Education: Duke University
- Scientific career
- Fields: Biology
- Workplaces: University of Washington
- Thesis: The role of added-mass in impulsive locomotion with special reference to medusae (1982)
- Doctoral advisor: Steven Vogel

Thomas Louis Daniel (born 1954) is an American biologist, Joan and Richard Komen Endowed Chair of Biology at University of Washington, and the CEO of the Washington Research Foundation. He was the interim director of the National Science Foundation Engineering Research Center for Sensorimotor Neural Engineering. Since 2006, he has served on the Scientific Advisory Board for the Allen Institute for Brain Science.

Thomas graduated from the University of Wisconsin with a BS and MS, and from Duke University with a PhD, where he studied with Steven Vogel and Stephen Wainwright. He was the Bantrell Postdoctoral Fellow in Engineering Sciences at California Institute of Technology where he studied with Ted Wu until 1984. He is a member of the Washington State Academy of Sciences and a Fellow of the American Association for Advancement of Science.

== Awards ==
- 1996 MacArthur Fellows Program
- 2012 Fellow of the American Association for the Advancement of Science
- 2013 Guggenheim Fellowship
