= Materials Research Science and Engineering Centers =

US-based research centers

Materials Research Science and Engineering Centers (MRSECs) are university based research centers supported by the MRSEC Program of the Division of Materials Research at the U.S. National Science Foundation (NSF). The centers support interdisciplinary research on materials science. MRSECs are a significant component of NSF's center-based research portfolio. MRSECs were established by NSF in 1994 but their roots go back to the post-Sputnik era. These centers required significant changes in the conduct of materials research and education.

Since much of the information regarding current MRSECs is available from websites only a brief overview of the current program is provided. The main purpose of this article is to review the historical aspects of MRSECs and the significance of their impact on materials research and education in the U.S.

== Program summary ==
Research in MRSECs is carried out in interdisciplinary research groups (IRGs), teams of six to a dozen or more researchers. MRSECs range in size from two to four IRGs. The topics of the IRGs within a center may be focused on closely related scientific or technological topics or can cover distinct areas of research.

MRSEC awards are for six years with competitions held every three years. Competitions are open to all US academic institutions. Only one award is made per institution. Funding levels for a given MRSEC currently range approximately several million dollars/y. Each center has considerable flexibility to distribute its funds consistent with its proposed and approved research and education proposal. Typical MRSECs allocate funds for support of "seed projects,"

MRSECs feature partnerships with other academic institutions, national laboratories, and industry as well as international collaborations. The centers also feature extensive experimental and computational facilities, which are generally accessible to outside users.

A key mandate for these centers is workforce development. The largest component of the center's funding supports students (undergraduate and graduate), and postdoctoral researchers. In addition, MRSECs have outreach activities involving K - 12 students and public education through collaborations with museums and other public institutions.

== Historical background ==
=== Pre-1960 ===
The modern study of materials intersects many of the traditional scientific disciplines, including physics, chemistry, engineering, and increasingly the biosciences and mathematics. Until the middle of the 20th century these various disciplines approached the study of materials with their own distinctive methodologies. Interdisciplinary collaborations, especially at academic institutions, were not the norm. Past exceptions were the successful collaborative approaches leading to the intense technological developments during the Second World War, including the military and peaceful applications of nuclear energy production.

The late 1950s the U.S. government increased its support of interdisciplinary, collaborative research at academic institutions. The launch of the Russian space satellite Sputnik on October 4, 1957, profoundly impacted how scientific and technological research was conducted in the United States. Two new agencies were founded: The National Aeronautic and Space Administration (NASA) and the Advanced Research Project Agency (ARPA, later DARPA) within the Department of Defense. NASA was to define US-supported space exploration. ARPA was tasked more broadly with technology and science, often with potential military applications. In addition, the National Defense Education Act of 1958 sought to increase the number of trained engineers, scientists, and mathematicians.

The post Sputnik enthusiasm for more investment in science research led to a broader recommendation in March 1958 for coordinating materials research in the United States by President Eisenhower's Science and Advisory Committee (PSAC). A subsequent report entitled "Strengthening American Science", was submitted to President Eisenhower in December 1958. This report led, by Executive Order of President Eisenhower on March 13, 1959, to the formation of the Federal Council for Science and Technology. One of the early actions of this council was the establishment of a "Coordinating Committee on Materials Research and Development" (CCMRD), which was chaired by John W. Williams, Director of Research of the Atomic Energy Commission (AEC). The ultimate outcome was the establishment of three university based Interdisciplinary Laboratories (IDLs) in mid 1960 under the supervision of ARPA.,

The idea of an interdisciplinary laboratory in the solid state and materials sciences had already proved extremely successful in industrial laboratory settings (such as the Bell Laboratories and others) leading, for example, to the development of the transistor and the laser. The establishment of such laboratories in an academic environment arose naturally from the demands of the post-Sputnik era for a large, highly trained, scientific workforce.

=== Interdisciplinary Laboratories (IDLs) 1960-1972 ===
MRSECs evolved from the Interdisciplinary Laboratories (IDLs) initiated by the Department of Defense in 1960. The creation of three Interdisciplinary Laboratories, at Cornell University, the University of Pennsylvania, and Northwestern University, was announced by ARPA on July 11, 1960. The contracts required that these universities "shall establish an interdisciplinary materials research program and shall furnish the necessary personnel and facilities for the conduct of research in the science of materials..." In the following year (1961) eight additional IDLs were created: Brown University, University of Chicago, Harvard, University of Maryland, Massachusetts Institute of Technology, University of North Carolina, Purdue University, and Stanford University. A 12th IDL was added at the University of Illinois in 1962, which was administered by the Atomic Energy Commission (AEC). Subsequently, there were three more AEC contracts and two contracts through NASA. The role of the AEC in establishing a strong materials research community was well known since the advent of nuclear reactors and the importance of materials in reactor cost, efficiency, and safety. As early as 1955 John von Neumann, renowned mathematician and contributor to the Manhattan Project, in his role as commissioner of the AEC and member of the AEC General Advisory Committee (GAC), strongly endorsed a materials-focused institute in an academic setting.

The impact of the IDLs on the training of students was significant. By 1969 over 360 new doctorate degrees were awarded. A report by the National Academy of Sciences concluded that these center based programs were instrumental in defining "materials science and engineering" as a new interdisciplinary activity which was evidenced by a rapid increase of materials science departments between 1960 and 1970 and beyond. In addition, to the building of new facilities infrastructure these centers of excellence led to the training of not only materials scientists, but also physicists, chemists, engineers and other professionals.

The National Academy study noted that though the IDLs were considered a success, there was room for growth of interdisciplinary collaborations among faculty from disparate university departments. However, it was acknowledged that joint block funding and joint use of shared experimental facilities by students and faculty from diverse departments had planted the seeds for increased interdisciplinarity in materials research.

=== The Materials Research Laboratories (MRLs) 1972-1994 ===
In late 1969 an amendment to the Military Authorization Act, sponsored by Senator Mike Mansfield, placed restrictions on the funding of long-term basic research by agencies of the Department of Defense, including ARPA/DARPA. (ARPA was changed to DARPA in 1972). Consequently, a decision was made in 1970 to transfer the IDLs to the National Science Foundation. The block type IDL grant for multidisciplinary research and shared facilities would mean a distinct departure of NSF's funding approach at that time which was support of predominantly small, single investigator grants in a particular discipline. After an in-depth review by NSF of the IDL program a transfer of the then existing 12 IDLs to NSF was recommended. However, the transfer came with several major critical provisions. These included the following:

"The laboratories, now renamed 'Materials Research Laboratories', would retain locally administered block (or 'core') funding intended to 'facilitate research in materials science and engineering which is either difficult or unfeasible to carry out under traditional funding of individual research.' Most importantly, the new component added by NSF was that 'scientific excellence is viewed as a necessary, but no longer sufficient, condition to qualify for MRL core support.' In addition, the MRLs would be judged by their ability to foster 'coherent, multidisciplinary and multi-investigator projects requiring the expertise of two or more materials related disciplines.' These so-called thrust groups are the heart of the current core funding at MRLs; at their best they have achieved a transformation in the way materials research is done at universities and in the way graduate education proceeds."

Acceptance by NSF of the new materials laboratories in 1972 led to the creation of the Division of Materials Research (DMR). Its initial portfolio consisted of the MRL program as well as individual investigator programs closely related to materials science which were drawn from other parts of NSF. Initially, the MRL program made up approximately 40% of the DMR budget. By 1985, with the growth of individual investigator and small group programs, the MRL program was funded at a level of about 20% of the total DMR budget.

Between 1972 and 1985, a number of additional MRLs were added and some of the existing centers were phased out. The following table summarizes this information:

TABLE 1 Interdisciplinary Laboratories (IDLs) and Materials Research Laboratories (MRLs) 1960–1996. Laboratories were identified as IDLs between 1960 and 1972 and MRLs starting in 1972. Laboratories terminated in 1994 and 1996 were eligible to participate in competition with other institutions for the new Materials Research Science and Engineering Centers (MRSECs) in 1994 and 1996, respectively.

INSTITUTION	YEAR STARTED	YEAR TERMINATED
Cornell U.	1960	1994
U. Pennsylvania	1960	1996
Northwestern U.	1960	1996
Brown U.	1961	1988
U. Chicago	1961	1994
Harvard U.	1961	1994
U. Maryland	1961	1977
Mass. Institute of Technology	1961	1994
U. North Carolina	1961	1978
Purdue U.	1961	1987
Stanford U.	1961	1994
U. Illinois Urbana-Chanpaign	1962 (with AEC)	1994
Carnegie Mellon U.	1973	1987
U. Mass. Amherst	1973	1994
Pennsylvania State U.	1974	1987
Case Western U.	1974	1987
Ohio State U.	1982	1987
UC Santa Barbara	1992	1996

MRL technical accomplishments are significant and have been detailed in a number of studies. Another important impact has been the cultural change at U.S. universities in how research could be conducted across traditional departmental boundaries. This trend was initiated by the IDLs but greatly strengthened by the MRL program because of the new NSF guidelines concerning requirements for interdisciplinarity. A new generation of students would be trained in a highly collaborative and interdisciplinary environment and the experiences of the IDL/MRL programs in the fields of materials and condensed matter sciences would be the proving ground for other center type endeavors in a wide range of fields.

=== Impact of IDLs/MRLs on other NSF Centers ===
The mid-1980s saw a convergence of a number of favorable trends for the establishments of NSF center based activities in a wide range of fields. There was a strong interest in government investments in basic science that could be leveraged by matching funds from industry and other sources. In addition, the role of multidisciplinary teams in conducting research and educating students was widely appreciated.

The first new centers-based initiative at NSF was the creation of the Engineering Research Centers (ERCs) in 1985. Although the role of the previous 25-year history of funding the materials laboratories in preparing universities to accept a wider role in conducting interdisciplinary research was instrumental for the creation of new types of centers, this historical connection was not widely appreciated. Both NSF and the Office of Science Technology Policy, viewed the creation of ERCs as the major new initiative in 1985 for leveraging NSF funds. The following description of the announcement of the ERC program in 1985 is illuminating:

"George A. Keyworth II, President's Reagan Science Advisor and Director of the Office of Science Technology Policy, refers to the creation of the ERCs by the National Science Foundation as: 'the single most important thing that we've done as an Administration in increasing efficiency and effectiveness of federal R&D dollars.' He said the centers address a widely recognized need in various fields of science and technology: 'Continued pushing of the frontiers in those fields was constrained by the difficulty of assembling multidisciplinary teams to work on the problems. Our universities are, justifiably and understandably, structured to pursue disciplinary research. On the other hand, we increasingly find ourselves as a nation confronting the solving of problems that have technically based solutions. We need to expose our young people to a problem-solving environment....These Centers - I'd rather call them Science and Technology Centers - are multidisciplinary mechanism by which chemists, physicists, neurobiologists, engineers, etc, can get together and solve exciting, intellectually demanding, real-world problems.' "

It was pointed out by William O. Baker that the above comments about the economic potential of the ERCs are nearly the same as those describing the original IDLs in the early 1960s. Baker concludes that "it is refreshing indeed to find such current agreement on the concept that has involved so significant a portion of our best academic talent."

The first six ERC awards were made in 1985. These awards are generally for five years with one other 5 year renewal possible for a total funding length of 10 years. In the same year NSF made five-year awards for five supercomputing centers and made plans for the development of a program for Science and Technology Centers (STCs) that would ultimately touch all areas of NSF programs. The first 11 STCs were established in 1988. The 13 centers that are part of the 2013 class of STCs cover a wide range of subjects ranging from studies of brain and intelligence to modeling of atmospheric processes to the study of quantum materials.

Because of concerns about the impact on center funding on individual investigator awards the National Science Board required that center awards cannot be renewed without open recompetition. Since the establishment of ERCs and STCs a large number of other centers have been established across all major NSF disciplines and now represent an essential element of the NSF funding portfolio.

=== Establishment of MRSECs (1994 - 1996) ===
The majority of MRLs were started between 1972 and 1984 with only a few later additions. The MRL competition of 1992 led to the start of only one new center: the MRL at the University of California Santa Barbara. The lack of new awards, coupled with the National Science Board re-competition requirement, provided one impetus for the development of the NSF Materials Research Science and Engineering Centers (MRSEC) program. Previously, MRLs, once funded, could be continually supported without a need to compete against other center candidates. The MRSEC program limits awards to a fixed time period, currently six years. Additional support is possible, but only on the basis of a new proposal that competes nationally against all other applicants.

The transition from the MRL to the MRSEC programs occurred through two competitions held in 1993/4 and 1995/96, respectively. The competitions were open to all US academic institutions, including those with then current MRL awards. Institutions with awards made under the Materials Research Group (MRG) program, which was initiated at NSF in 1984, were eligible to participate in the competition. All MRL and MRG awards were discontinued after 1996. In all, 10 MRLs and 17 MRGs participated in the competitions of 1994–96. As seen in Table 2, nine of the MRLs were successful in transitioning to MRSECs, and six MRSEC awards went to institutions with prior MRG awards. Importantly, new MRSEC awards were made to six institutions that never had any substantial NSF center or large group support in materials research.

TABLE. Materials Research Science and Engineering Centers (Spring 2023).

INSTITUTION	START YEAR
Brandeis U.	2020
U.Cal. Irvine	2020
U.Cal. San Diego	2020
U.Cal. Santa Barbara	2023
U. Chicago	2020
Columbia U.	2020
U. of Delaware	2020
Harvard U.	2020
U. of Illinois, UC	2023
U. of Minnesota	2020
Northwestern U.	2023
Ohio State U.	2020
Penn. State U.	2020
Princeton U.	2020
U. Tennessee	2023
U. Texas	2023
U. Washington	2023
U. Wisconsin	2023

== National Academy study of MRSEC program (2007) ==
An assessment of the MRSEC program was published by the National Academy of Sciences in 2007. The Executive Summary summarizes the impact of the program:

"MRSEC awards continue to be in great demand. The intense competition for them within the community indicates a strong perceived value."

The report lists a number of key areas where the MRSEC program has an impact, including providing the resources and environment that fosters:

- interdisciplinary, collaborative research;
- interdisciplinary training for the future scientific and technical workforce;
- rapid response to new ideas, including support for higher-risk projects, than is possible with single-investigator grants;
- increased institutional, local, and/or state support for materials research;
- attraction of high quality students and junior faculty;
- development of infrastructure helpful for organizing and managing experimental and computational facilities and educational and industrial outreach.

Among the report's recommendations are an increase in the grant size of the centers, which would allow adequate resources for education and outreach, while ensuring that the support for research activities is not compromised. In addition, the NAS study recommended strengthening the cooperative aspects of MRSECs and continue the progress made in the past toward building a national cooperating network of centers. The report concludes that such a network, once fully established, would "strengthen materials science and engineering in the United States as a discipline and as a factor in U.S. competitiveness."
