= Biokhimiya =

- Discipline: Biochemistry
- Language: Russian, English
- Edited by: Vladimir P. Skulachev

Publication details
- History: 1936–present
- Publisher: Nauka/Interperiodica (Russia)
- Frequency: Monthly
- Impact factor: 2.487 (2020)

Standard abbreviations
- ISO 4: Biokhimiya

Indexing
- CODEN: BIORAK
- ISSN: 0006-2979 (print); 1608-3040 (web)

Links
- Journal homepage; Online homepage

Biokhimiya is a Russian peer-reviewed scientific journal of biochemistry published by Nauka/Interperiodica. The journal was established by the Academy of Sciences of the USSR (now Russian Academy of Sciences) and the Russian Biochemical Society in 1936. The English translation Biochemistry (Moscow) has been published since 1956. Until his death in February 2023 it was edited by Vladimir P. Skulachev.

== Abstracting and indexing ==
Biokhimiya or its English translation are abstracted and indexed in the following databases.

- Abstracts in Anthropology
- Academic OneFile
- Academic Search
- AGRICOLA
- Aquatic Sciences and Fisheries Abstracts
- Biochemistry and Biophysics Citation Index
- Biological Abstracts
- BIOSIS
- CAB Abstracts
- CAB International
- Chemical Abstracts Service
- Chemical Titles
- ChemWeb
- Compendex
- Cambridge Scientific Abstracts
- Current Abstracts
- Current Contents/Life Sciences
- EBSCO
- EI-Compendex
- EMBASE
- EMBiology
- Excerpta Medica
- Expanded Academic
- Food Science and Technology Abstracts
- Global Health
- Google Scholar
- Health Reference Center Academic
- IBIDS
- Index Copernicus
- Index International de Cardiologie
- Index Medicus/MEDLINE
- International Abstracts of Biological Sciences
- ISI Alerting Services
- INIS Atomindex
- Journal Citation Reports/Science Edition
- Mass Spectrometry Bulletin
- Reaxys
- Science Citation Index
- Scopus
- Summon by Serial Solutions
