= EMAGE =

Content
- Description: e-Mouse Atlas of Gene Expression
- Organisms: mouse

Contact
- Research center: MRC Human Genetics Unit
- Primary citation: PMID 19767607

Access
- Website: emouseatlas.org/emage/

Miscellaneous
- License: Creative Commons Attribution License 3.0

EMAGE (e-Mouse Atlas of Gene Expression (Note: Historically, EMAGE was an acronym for Edinburgh Mouse Atlas of Gene Expression.)) is an online biological database of gene expression data in the developing mouse (Mus musculus) embryo. The data held in EMAGE is spatially annotated to a framework of 3D mouse embryo models produced by EMAP (e-Mouse Atlas Project). These spatial annotations allow users to query EMAGE by spatial pattern as well as by gene name, anatomy term or Gene Ontology (GO) term. EMAGE is a freely available web-based resource funded by the Medical Research Council (UK) and based at the MRC Human Genetics Unit in the Institute of Genetics and Molecular Medicine, Edinburgh, UK.

== Contents ==
EMAGE contains in situ hybridisation, immunohistochemistry, and in situ reporter (e.g. knock-in and gene trap) data. It includes wholemount data, section data and full 3D OPT (Optical Projection Tomography) data. The gene expression patterns are mapped into or onto the standard models by a team of biocurators, using bespoke mapping software. In addition to the spatial annotations, EMAGE data is also text annotated to provide a text based description of the expression patterns. This text annotation is carried out in collaboration with the MGI Gene Expression Database (GXD) using the EMAP mouse anatomy ontology.

EMAGE data comes primarily from peer reviewed, published journal articles, and from large scale screens, but also from direct submissions from researches working in the field. Data does not need to be published to be included in EMAGE, however EMAGE is a curated database. Biocurators check the accuracy of the meta-data included in the database entries and as well as performing the spatial annotations of the data.

EMAGE entries are designed to adhere to the Minimum information specification for in situ hybridization and immunohistochemistry experiments (MISFISHIE) specifications, and as such contain information about the submitter/author publication, detection reagent, assay specimen preparation, and experimental procedures as well as the original data images and the spatial and text annotations. EMAGE entries also contain links to a variety of related resources based on the either the gene being assayed, or the assay itself.

== See also ==
- Allen Brain Atlas
