= Mirall =

Sculpture by Jaume Plensa in Seattle, Washington, U.S.

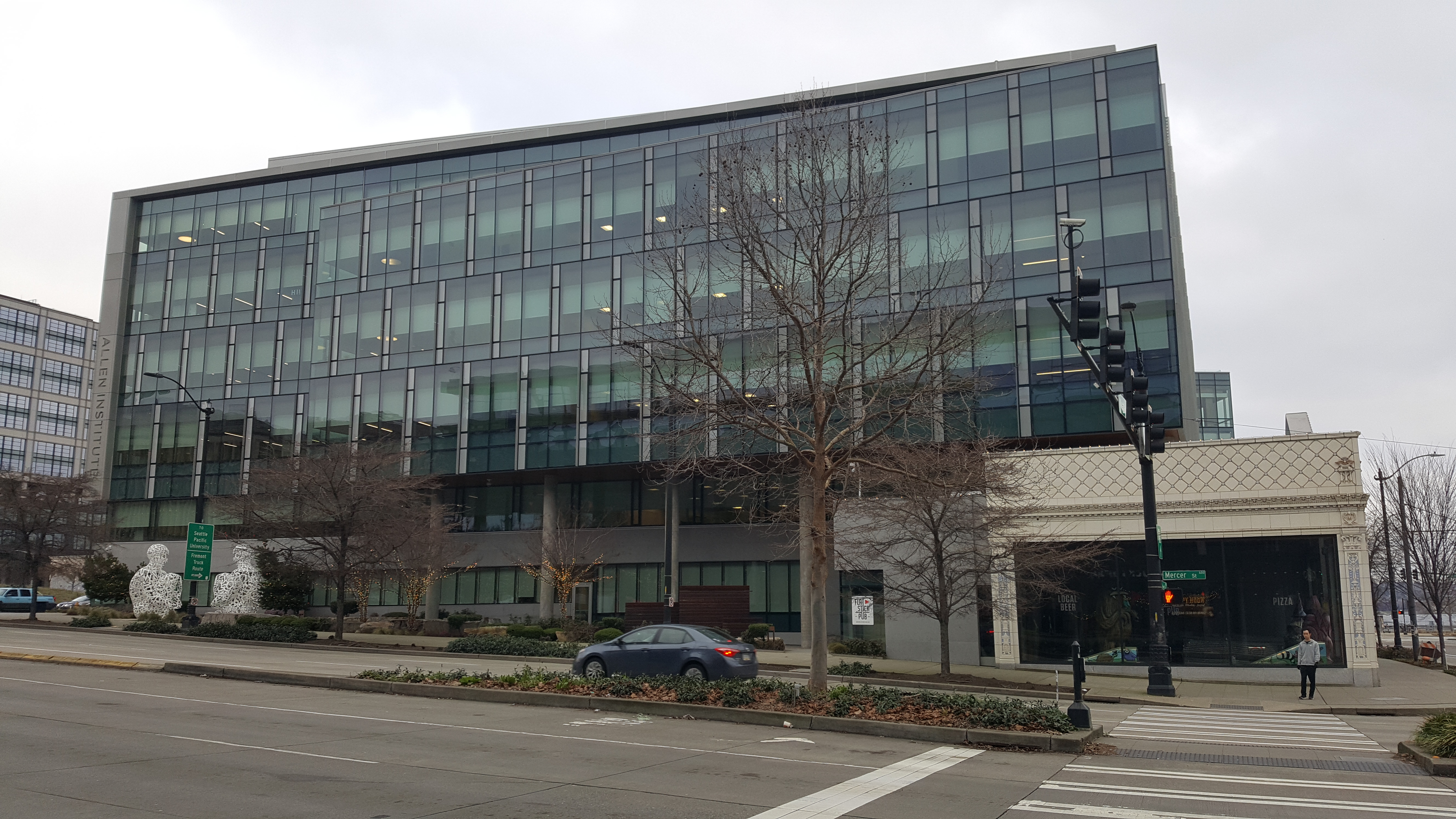
- The sculpture installed outside the Allen Institute, 2022
- Artist: Jaume Plensa
- Year: 2015
- Location: Seattle, Washington, U.S.
- 47°37′29″N 122°20′22″W

Mirall is a sculpture by Jaume Plensa, installed outside the Allen Institute in Seattle's South Lake Union neighborhood, in the U.S. state of Washington. Located at the intersection of Mercer Street and 9th Avenue North, the 2015 painted stainless steel sculpture includes two seated figures facing one another, each made of letters and characters from eight languages: Arabic, Chinese, Greek, Hindi, Hebrew, Japanese, Latin, and Russian. Kurt Schlosser of GeekWire said the figures appear to be in a "perpetual, silent conversation".

== See also ==
- 2015 in art
