= Center for Neurotechnology =

US research center

Coordinates: 47.658608°N 122.312391°W

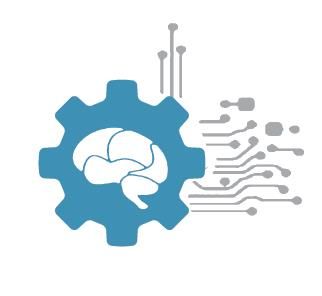
- CNT Logo
- Formation: August 15, 2011; 15 years ago
- Location: Seattle, Washington, US
- Directors: Rajesh Rao & Chet Moritz
- Deputy Directors: Sam Kassegne, Polina Anikeeva
- Previous Directors: Yoky Matsuoka, Thomas Daniel
- Website: centerforneurotech.uw.edu

The Center for Neurotechnology (CNT) is an Engineering Research Center funded by the National Science Foundation that develops devices to restore the body's capabilities for sensation and movement. The center is based at the University of Washington. Its core partner organizations are the Massachusetts Institute of Technology and San Diego State University.

== Mission ==
The center's mission is to develop innovative neural devices and methods for directing engineered neuroplasticity in the brain and spinal cord, which will improve sensory and motor function for people with spinal cord injury, stroke and other neurological disorders. Engineered neuroplasticity is a new form of rehabilitation. By using engineered devices to re-wire the nervous system and restore connections in the brain and spinal cord. The center researchers specialize in fields related to neural engineering. Center faculty also hail from various fields of medicine to help assist with real-world implementation of designs. The center places a strong emphasis on neuroethics, exploring how ethical issues such as identity, privacy, and moral or legal responsibility in relation to the expanding field of neural technologies.

The National Science Foundation has awarded the CNT $~30 million since 2011. In September 2018, the Center for Sensorimotor Neural Engineering changed its name to the Center for Neurotechnology to highlight the role of neurotechnologies in healing the brain and spinal cord.

== Research ==
=== Testbeds ===
1. Cortical Plasticity Testbed: The goal of this testbed is to engineer neuroplasticity in the brain, improving the brain's ability to adapt and recover after injury. It is targeted toward people with neurological disorders such as stroke. Center researchers test the ability of neural stimulation protocols to induce activity-dependent neuroplasticity by remodeling neural connections between cortical regions in the brain.
2. Spinal Plasticity Testbed: This testbed directly tests researchers ability to engineer neuroplasticity within the spinal cord after injury..Center researchers are using electrical spinal stimulation synchronized with residual muscle activity or movement in order to produce lasting improvements in hand and arm function after spinal cord injury.
3. Co-adaptation Testbed: This testbed focuses on understanding and developing mathematical algorithms designed to help a brain–computer interface co-adapt with the brain itself in a neural stimulation system. An example of work is to quantify large-scale cortical dynamics during learning and neuroplasticity induction, as well as changes in cortical dynamics that occur when users directly control brain stimulation using their thoughts.

=== Thrusts ===
A Research Thrust is the fundamental knowledge or basic research that investigators bring to the center. These thrusts feed into technologies that exist and that CNT researchers are focusing on, including electrocorticography, the practice of placing electrodes on the brain to record electrical activity. These new technologies are then integrated into research testbeds.

==== Thrust 1: Communication and Interface ====
The Communication and Interface thrust is largely concerned with developing more intelligent ways of extracting information from the brain, interpreting them, and then providing feedback to the neural system. The objective of developing these intelligent systems is to use less power to compute faster, and, potentially, harvest their power through innovative sources. At the same time, these systems must be user-friendly. In other words, they must be easy to use and reliable in mechanical design and computation functions. An objective of this thrust is to develop an electrocorticography (ECoG) system that is compact and power efficient enough to be fully implantable.

==== Thrust 2: Computational Neuroscience ====
The object of Thrust 2 is to better understand neural circuit dynamics and develop co-adaptive mathematical algorithms for inducing neuroplasticity in the brain and spinal cord. A deeper understanding of the brain's computation will inform design of sensorimotor devices for neural control and allow for more targeted future work on investigating neural function. Using this knowledge, inorganic systems can be improved to better interact with the brain's endogenous system of computation.

==== Thrust 3: Experimental Neuroscience ====
The Experimental Neuroscience thrust seeks to uncover fundamental principles of sensorimotor neuroscience by performing innovative closed-loop experiments enabled by CNT hardware and computational advances.

==== Thrust 4: Neuroethics ====
The Neuroethics thrust is concerned with understanding and exploring ethical issues like privacy, normality, and moral or legal responsibilities in relation to neural technologies. One focus is on ensuring that people with disabilities are involved at every point in the development of the technologies that are ultimately aimed at assisting them. The neuroethics team conducts focus group discussions with these "end users" to help guide the work of other CNT researchers concerned with developing these assistive systems.

== Educational programs ==
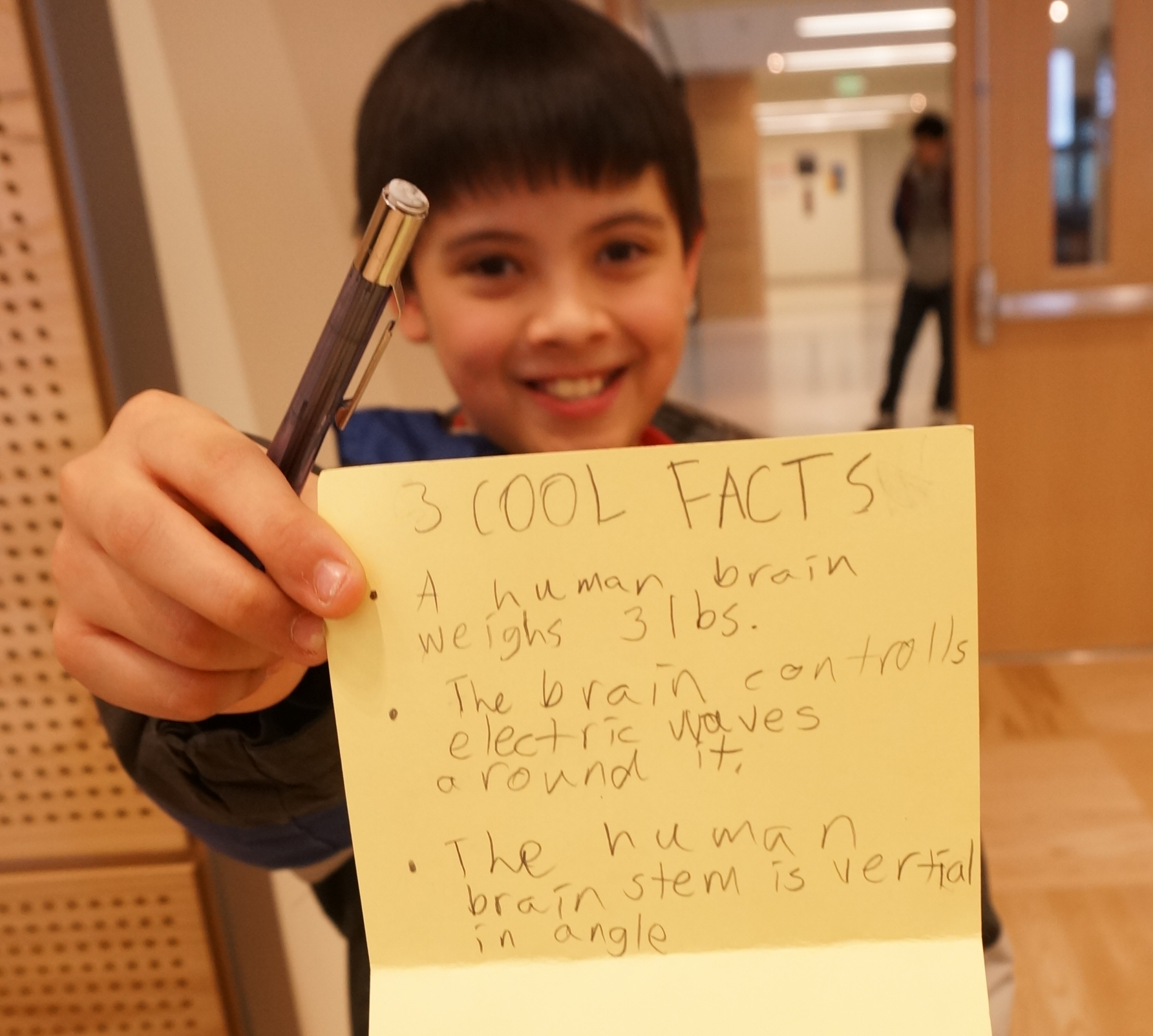
Brain Awareness Week, 2014

The CNT places emphasis on educating the next generation of researchers. This includes traditional programs at the graduate level, but also programs designed for undergraduates, K-12 students, and K-12 teachers to encourage diversity and inclusion of minorities and persons with disabilities. The CNT operates as a host site for NSF programs, including: Research Experiences for Undergraduates and Research Experiences for Teachers.

=== Undergraduates (REU) ===
As a host site for NSF's REU program, the CNT hosts students from across the United States for ten weeks during the summer. REU students conduct research in CNT labs, attend lectures and take part in classes covering scientific communications and research methods.

=== Veterans (REV) ===
The center sponsors a program for veterans on the University of Washington's Seattle campus. Similar to the REU program, participants from across the United States take part in research at the interface of biology and engineering for ten weeks during the summer. REV participants work in CNT labs, attend lectures and learn about scientific communications and research methods.

=== Teachers (RET) ===
Similar to the NSF REU program, the RET program places teachers in CNT labs. Participating teachers develop lesson plans to take back to the classroom; these lesson plans are posted on the CNT website for anyone to access and use.

=== Young Scholars Program (YSP) ===
The Young Scholars Program is a summer program designed to give high school students the opportunity to conduct research in an academic laboratory setting before entering college. In 2017, the CNT piloted a condensed version of this program called YSP-REACH. YSP-REACH is a five-day summer program at the University of Washington. High school students receive an introduction to neuroscience and neural engineering, neuroethics, scientific communication and the latest developments in brain-computer interfaces. The goal of YSP and YSP-REACH is to provide students with exposure to the field of neural engineering and provide basic preparation for college studies in STEM subjects as well as future STEM careers.

=== Undergraduate Curriculum ===
The CNT has developed new undergraduate curriculum for the University of Washington that includes the course Neural Engineering, Neural Engineering Lab and Neural Engineering Tech Studio. An undergraduate minor in Neural Computation and Engineering is now available. Materials from these courses will be disseminated to partner institutions.

=== Graduate Curriculum ===
The CNT has developed new curriculum for a graduate certificate in Neural Computation and Engineering that includes two new courses. In addition, the CNT supports exchange students to promote an international spirit of collaboration within the field.
