= Alta Charo =

American academic (born 1958)

Robin Alta Charo (born 1958) is the Warren P. Knowles Professor of Law and Bioethics emeritus at the University of Wisconsin–Madison and a leading American authority on bioethics. She held appointments in both Wisconsin's law school and medical school.

Charo is among the leading advocates for embryonic stem cell research in the United States.

She earned a B.A. in biology from Harvard University in 1979 and a J.D. from Columbia University in 1982. She is a fellow of the Hastings Center, an independent bioethics research institution.

In 2020, the American Academy of Arts and Sciences elected her fellow.
