= Allen Institute for Brain Science =

Research institute based in Seattle, WA, USA

Coordinates: 47.650114°N 122.352457°W

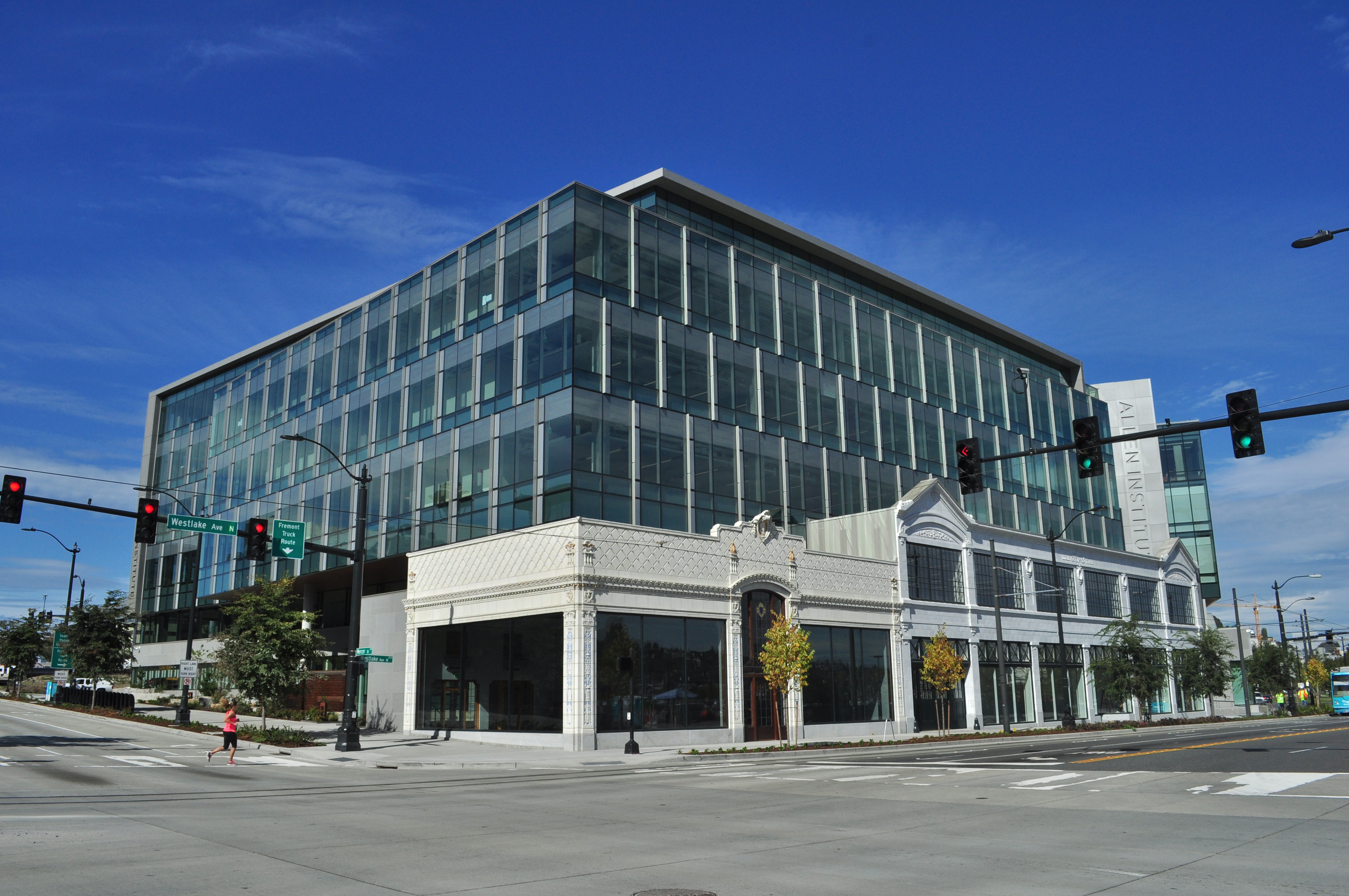
- Headquarters of the Allen Institute for Brain Science
- Formation: 2003; 23 years ago
- Founders: Paul Allen, Jody Allen
- Type: 501(c)(3)
- Purpose: Neuroscience, brain research, biology, technology
- Headquarters: Seattle, Washington, U.S.
- Region served: Worldwide
- Key people: Hongkui Zeng (director); Christof Koch (chief scientist of the Mindscope Program)
- Website: alleninstitute.org/what-we-do/brain-science/

The Allen Institute for Brain Science is a division of the Allen Institute, based in Seattle, Washington, that focuses on bioscience research. Founded in 2003, it is dedicated to accelerating the understanding of how the human brain works. With the intent of catalyzing brain research in different areas, the Allen Institute provides free data and tools to scientists.

Started with $100 million in seed money from Microsoft co-founder and philanthropist Paul Allen in 2003, the institute tackles projects at the intersection of biology and technology. The resulting data create free, publicly available resources that fuel discovery for countless researchers. Hongkui Zeng is the current director of the institute.

== History and funding ==
The Allen Institute for Brain Science is a scientific division of the Allen Institute, a nonprofit research organization that also includes the Allen Institute for Cell Science, launched in 2014. The Paul G. Allen Frontiers Group was launched in 2016 while the Allen Institute for Immunology was launched in 2018. All four divisions of the Allen Institute are housed in the same building in Seattle's South Lake Union neighborhood. The institute employs a business model that combines the operational agility and accountability of a for-profit enterprise with the founding vision to take on ambitious projects in neuroscience.

In 2012, the institute received an additional pledge of $300 million from Paul Allen, bringing his total commitment to $500 million.

== Online public resources ==
The Allen Institute for Brain Science provides researchers and educators with a variety of online public resources for exploring the nervous system. These resources, accessible via the Allen Brain Atlas data portal, integrating extensive gene expression data and neuroanatomy, and provide data search and viewing tools.

=== Allen Mouse Brain Atlas ===
The inaugural project of the Allen Institute was announced on September 26, 2006. Named the Allen Brain Atlas, it was a web-based, three-dimensional map of gene expression in the mouse brain detailing more than 21,000 genes at the cellular level. Since the project's launch, it has been renamed the Allen Mouse Brain Atlas to distinguish it from subsequent atlas projects.

=== Allen Spinal Cord Atlas ===
On July 17, 2008, the Allen Institute for Brain Science launched the online Allen Spinal Cord Atlas. The spinal cord atlas is an interactive, genome-wide map showing where each gene is expressed, or "turned on", throughout the mouse spinal cord. It is set up like the Allen Institute's earlier atlas of the adult mouse brain. The map could help reveal new treatments for human neurological disorders. The map points researchers toward places where genes are active.

The Allen Spinal Cord Atlas led to the discovery of a new class of cells in the spinal cord that behave like stem cells, according to researchers at the University of British Columbia. Jane Roskams, the neuroscientist who led the study, said that, "By using the Allen Spinal Cord Atlas, we were able to discover a brand new cell type that has previously been overlooked and that could be an important player in all manner of spinal cord injury and disease, including multiple sclerosis and ALS."

=== Allen Developing Mouse Brain Atlas ===
On November 14, 2008, the Allen Institute for Brain Science announced the launch of the Allen Developing Mouse Brain Atlas, providing a highly detailed map of gene activity in the mouse brain at several time points across development, including four embryonic ages, three postnatal, and aging time points. The in situ hybridization data is accompanied by a set of reference atlases drawn by neuroanatomist Luis Puelles.

=== Allen Human Brain Atlas ===
On May 24, 2010, the Allen Institute announced it was expanding its tools from the mouse into the human brain with the launch of the Allen Human Brain Atlas. This highly comprehensive atlas integrates several kinds of data, including data collected by magnetic resonance imaging (MRI), diffusion tensor technology (DTI), as well as histology and gene expression data derived from both microarray and in situ hybridization (ISH) approaches. The Allen Human Brain Atlas allows researchers to see where a gene is turned on. "The location of where these genes are active is at the very center of understanding how brain diseases work", neurologist Jeffrey L. Noebels told The Wall Street Journal in April 2011. The Allen Human Brain Atlas was profiled in the journal Nature on September 19, 2012.

=== Allen Mouse Brain Connectivity Atlas ===
The Allen Mouse Brain Connectivity Atlas was launched online on November 3, 2011, and moved the Allen Institute's mapping efforts beyond its historical focus on gene expression toward neural circuitry. The atlas is a three-dimensional, high-resolution map of neural connections throughout the mouse brain, designed to help scientists understand how the brain is wired, offering new insights into how the brain works and what goes awry in brain diseases and disorders.

=== Allen Cell Types Database ===
Launched in 2015, the Allen Cell Types Database is a new tool to help scientists understand the building blocks of the brain and a major step toward creating a comprehensive map of the brain. The database will help create a common language for researchers around the world to use in observing, measuring and ultimately sorting cells into types much like the periodic table sorts elements. The first release of data includes information on more than 240 cells in the mouse brain. In 2017, the Allen Institute added data from human brain cells to the database.

=== Allen Brain Observatory ===
The Allen Brain Observatory was launched in 2016 to capture cellular-level activity of neurons in the mouse visual cortex. Experiments through the observatory use visual or electrical readouts of neural activity as animals see visual stimuli, ranging from natural images to black and white grid lines to a clip from the Orson Welles film noir, Touch of Evil. In 2018, the institute opened the observatory for research projects proposed by scientists from the broader community through a program called OpenScope, which was modeled after large-scale shared physics observatories such as the Hubble Space Telescope.

=== Other online resources ===
In addition to the atlas resources, the Allen Institute has generated several other online research tools, including:

- The Ivy Glioblastoma Atlas Project (Ivy GAP), a platform for exploring the anatomic and genetic basis of glioblastoma at the cellular and molecular levels.
- The BrainSpan Atlas of the Developing Human Brain, a resource for studying human brain development developed by a consortium of scientific partners and funded by awards from the National Institutes of Health.

== Awards ==
- Forbes – 30 Under 30 Rising Stars Transforming Science and Health to Allen Institute scientist Adrian Cheng (2012)
- Cajal Club – Krieg Lifetime Achievement Award to Paul Allen for extraordinary contributions in neuroscience through his work with the Allen Institute (2010)
- American Academy of Neurology – Public Leadership in Neurology Award to Paul Allen for his strong commitment to brain research and work with the Allen Institute (2009)
- Time – "Top 100 Most Influential People in the World" to Paul Allen for his successful achievements at the Allen Institute (2007, 2008)
- Time – "Top Ten Medical Breakthroughs" (2006)
- Wired – Rave Award to Paul Allen and the Allen Institute for the completion of the Allen Mouse Brain Atlas (2007)
- Society for Neuroscience – Special Recognition Award to Paul Allen for his generous contributions to neuroscience through his work with the Allen Institute (2007)
- USA Weekend – "Top 10 Medical Breakthroughs of the Year" for the Allen Mouse Brain Atlas (2006)
