= Vladimir Skulachev =

Russian biochemist (1935–2023)

- Владимир Скулачёв
- Born: 21 February 1935; Moscow, Russian SFSR, USSR
- Died: 5 February 2023 (aged 87); Moscow, Russia
- Education: Doctor of Sciences (1990), Professor, Academician of the Russian Academy of Sciences
- Alma mater: Moscow State University (1970)
- Scientific career
- Fields: Biochemistry
- Workplaces: Moscow State University

Vladimir Petrovich Skulachev ([skulɑ'tʃɔf]; usually ['skuːlɑtʃef] in English; Russian: Владимир Петрович Скулачёв; 21 February 1935 – 5 February 2023) was a Russian biochemist, Academician of the Russian Academy of Sciences (since 1990), Doctor of Biological Sciences, Distinguished Professor at the Lomonosov Moscow State University, where he also was Dean of the Faculty of Bioengineering and Bioinformatics and Director of the A.N. Belozersky Institute Of Physico-Chemical Biology. Member of Academia Europaea. President of the Biochemical Society (Russia).

Skulachev graduated from the MSU Faculty of Biology in 1957.

He was elected a corresponding member of the Academy of Sciences of the Soviet Union in 1974 and full member in 1990.

He was Editor-in-Chief of the Биохимия (Biochemistry), journal of the Russian Academy of Sciences. He was also a member of the Editorial Board for Journal Bioenergetics and Biomembranes.

== Awards and honors ==
- Lenin Komsomol Prize (1967)
- Order of the Red Banner of Labour (1972)
- USSR State Prize (1975)
- Order of Honour (1996)
- Order "For Merit to the Fatherland", 4th class (2005)
- Order of Friendship (2013)
- Demidov Prize (2017)
