= Allen Brain Atlas =

Brain cell database and website

The Allen Mouse and Human Brain Atlases are projects within the Allen Institute for Brain Science which seek to combine genomics with neuroanatomy by creating gene expression maps for the mouse and human brain. They were initiated in September 2003 with a $100 million donation from Paul G. Allen and the first atlas went public in September 2006. As of May 2012, seven brain atlases have been published: Mouse Brain Atlas, Human Brain Atlas, Developing Mouse Brain Atlas, Developing Human Brain Atlas, Mouse Connectivity Atlas, Non-Human Primate Atlas, and Mouse Spinal Cord Atlas. There are also three related projects with data banks: Glioblastoma, Mouse Diversity, and Sleep. It is the hope of the Allen Institute that their findings will help advance various fields of science, especially those surrounding the understanding of neurobiological diseases. The atlases are free and available for public use online.

== History ==
In 2001, Paul Allen gathered a group of scientists, including James Watson and Steven Pinker, to discuss the future of neuroscience and what could be done to enhance neuroscience research (Jones 2009). During these meetings David Anderson from the California Institute of Technology proposed the idea that a three-dimensional atlas of gene expression in the mouse brain would be of great use to the neuroscience community. The project was set in motion in 2003 with a 100 million dollar donation by Allen through the Allen Institute for Brain Science. The project used a technique for mapping gene expression developed by Gregor Eichele and colleagues at the Max Planck Institute for Biophysical Chemistry in Goettingen, Germany. The technique uses colorimetric in situ hybridization to map gene expression. The project set a 3-year goal of finishing the project and making it available to the public.

An initial release of the first atlas, the mouse brain atlas, occurred in December 2004. Subsequently, more data for this atlas was released in stages. The final genome-wide data set was released in September 2006. However, the final release of the atlas was not the end of the project; the Atlas is still being improved upon. Also, other projects including the human brain atlas, developing mouse brain, developing human brain, mouse connectivity, non-human primate atlas, and the mouse spinal cord atlas are being developed through the Allen Institute for Brain Science in conjunction with the Allen Mouse Brain Atlas.

== Goals for the project ==
Allen Institute for Brain Science

The overarching goal and motto for all Allen Institute projects is "fueling discovery". The project strives to fulfill this goal and advance science in a few ways. First, they create brain atlases to better understand the connections between genes and brain functioning. They aim to advance the research and knowledge about neurobiological conditions such as Parkinson's, Alzheimer's, and Autism with their mapping of gene expression throughout the brain. The Brain Atlas projects also follow the "Allen Institute" motto with their open release of data and findings. This policy is also related to another goal of the Institute: collaborative and multidisciplinary research. Thus, any scientist from any discipline is able to look at the findings and take them into account while designing their own experiments. Also available to the public is the Brain Explorer application.

== Research techniques ==
The Allen Institute for Brain Science uses a project-based philosophy for their research. Each brain atlas focuses on its own project, made up of its own team of researchers. To complete an atlas, each research team collects and synthesizes brain scans, medical data, genetic information and psychological data. With this information, they are able to construct the 3-D biochemical architecture of the brain and figure out which proteins are expressed in certain parts of the brain. To gather the needed data, scientists at the Allen Institute use various techniques. One technique involves the use of postmortem brains and brain scanning technology to discover where in the brain genes are turned on and off. Another technique, called in situ hybridization, or ISH, is used to view gene expression patterns as in situ hybridization images.

Within the Brain Atlases, these 3-D ISH digital images and graphs reveal, in color, the regions where a given gene is expressed. In the Brain Explorer, any gene can be searched for and selected resulting in the in situ image appearing as an easily manipulated and explored fashion. Part of the creation of this anatomy-centred database of gene expression, includes aligning ISH data for each gene with a three-dimensional coordinate space through registration with a reference atlas created for the project.

== Contributions to neuroscience ==
The different types of cells in the central nervous system originate from varying gene expression. A map of gene expression in the brain allows researchers to correlate forms and functions. The Allen Brain Atlas lets researchers view the areas of differing expression in the brain which enables the viewing of neural connections throughout the brain. Viewing these pathways through differing gene expression as well as functional imaging techniques permits researchers to correlate between gene expression, cell types, and pathway function in relation to behaviors or phenotypes.

Even though the majority of research has been done in mice, 90% of genes in mice have a counterpart in humans. This makes the Atlas particularly useful for modeling neurological diseases. The gene expression patterns in normal individuals provide a standard for comparing and understanding altered phenotypes. Extending information learned from mouse diseases will help better the understanding of human neurological disorders. The atlas can show which genes and particular areas are effected in neurological disorders; the action of a gene in a disease can be evaluated in conjunction with general expression patterns and this data could shed light on the role of the particular gene in the disorder.

== Brain explorer ==
The Allen Brain Atlas website contains a downloadable 3-D interactive Brain explorer. The explorer is essentially a search engine for locations of gene expression; this is particularly useful in finding regions that express similar genes. Users can delineate networks and pathways using this application by connecting regions that co-express a certain gene. The explorer uses a multicolor scale and contains multiple planes of the brain that let viewers see differences in density and expression level. The images are a composite of many averaged samples so it is useful when comparing to individuals with abnormally low gene expression.

== Atlases ==
=== Mouse Brain ===
The Allen Mouse Brain Atlas is a comprehensive genome-wide map of the adult mouse brain that reveals where each gene is expressed. The mouse brain atlas was the original project of the Allen Brain Atlas and was finished in 2006. The purpose of the atlas is to aid in the development of neuroscience research. The hope of the project is that it will allow scientists to gain a better understanding of brain diseases and disorders such as autism and depression.

=== Human Brain ===
The Allen Human Brain Atlas was made public in May 2010. It was the first anatomically and genomically comprehensive three-dimensional human brain map. The atlas was created to enhance research in many neuroscience research fields including neuropharmacology, human brain imaging, human genetics, neuroanatomy, genomics and more. The atlas is also geared toward furthering research into mental health disorders and brain injuries such as Alzheimer's disease, autism, schizophrenia and drug addiction.

=== Developing Mouse Brain ===
The Allen Developing Mouse Brain Atlas is an atlas which tracks gene expression throughout the development of a C57BL/6 mouse brain. The project began in 2008 and is currently ongoing. The atlas is based on magnetic resonance imaging (MRI). It traces the growth, white matter, connectivity, and development of the C57BL/6 mouse brain from embryonic day 12 to postnatal day 80. This atlas enhances the ability of neuroscientists to study how pollutants and genetic mutations effect the development of the brain. Thus, the atlas may be used to determine what toxins pose special threats to children and pregnant mothers.

=== Mouse Brain Connectivity ===
The Allen Mouse Brain Connectivity Atlas was launched in November 2011. Unlike other atlases from the Allen Institute, this atlas focuses on the identification of neural circuitry that govern behavior and brain function. This neural circuitry is responsible for functions like behavior and perception. This map will allow scientists to further understand how the brain works and what causes brain diseases and disorders, such as Parkinson's disease and depression.

=== Mouse Spinal Cord ===
Unveiled in July 2008, the Allen Mouse Spinal Cord Atlas was the first genome-wide map of the mouse spinal cord ever constructed. The spinal cord atlas is a map of genome wide gene expression in the spinal cord of adult and juvenile C57 black mice. The initial unveiling included data for 2,000 genes and an anatomical reference section. A plan for the future includes expanding the amount of data to about 20,000 genes spanning the full length of the spinal cord.

The aim of the spinal cord atlas is to enhance research in the treatment of spinal cord injury, diseases, and disorders such as Lou Gehrig's disease (ALS) and spinal muscular atrophy. The project was funded by an array of donors including the Allen Research Institute, Paralyzed Veterans of America Research Foundation, the ALS Association, Wyeth Research, PEMCO Insurance, National Multiple Sclerosis Society, International Spinal Research Trust, and many other organizations, foundations, corporate and private donors.

== See also ==
- List of neuroscience databases
- EMAGE, the e-Mouse Atlas of Gene Expression
