= Glia (journal) =

- Discipline: Neuroscience
- Language: English
- Edited by: Bruce R. Ransom, Helmut Kettenmann

Publication details
- History: 1988-present
- Publisher: John Wiley & Sons
- Frequency: Monthly
- Impact factor: 4.9 (2024)

Standard abbreviations
- ISO 4: Glia

Indexing
- CODEN: GLIAEJ
- ISSN: 0894-1491 (print); 1098-1136 (web)
- LCCN: 88651355
- OCLC no.: 15804228

Links
- Journal homepage; Online access; Online archive

Glia is a monthly peer-reviewed scientific journal covering research on the structure and function of neuroglia. It was established in 1988 and is published by John Wiley & Sons. The founding and current editors-in-chief are Bruce R. Ransom (University of Washington School of Medicine) and Helmut Kettenmann (Max Delbrück Center for Molecular Medicine).

== Abstracting and indexing ==
The journal is abstracted and indexed in:

- Biological Abstracts
- BIOSIS Previews
- CSA Biological Sciences Database
- Current Contents/Life Sciences
- Current Opinion in Cell Biology
- Current Opinion in Neurology
- EMBASE
- Index Medicus/MEDLINE/PubMed
- Neurosciences Abstracts
- PsycINFO/Psychological Abstracts
- Science Citation Index
- Scopus
- VINITI Database RAS

According to the Journal Citation Reports, the journal has a 2024 impact factor of 5.1.
