= Smart Lighting ERC =

Engineering research center

Coordinates: 42.7300°N 73.6775°W

The Smart Lighting ERC (Smart Lighting Engineering Research Center) focuses on developing solid-state lighting systems with advanced functionality, with an "emphasis" on industry outreach to facilitate commercialization.

== Purpose ==
In the words of Director Robert F. Karlicek Jr, the Smart Lighting ERC seeks to contribute to the creation of "smart lighting systems that think." A primary goal of Gen-3 ERCs is the global commercialization of academic research.

== Partnership ==
The center is an NSF Gen-3 ERC formed in 2008, and is a partnership between the lead university Rensselaer Polytechnic Institute, (RPI) two core partner universities—Boston University (BU) and the University of New Mexico (UNM)—and three other outreach universities—Howard University, Morgan State University (MSU), and the Rose-Hulman Institute of Technology (RHIT).

== Funding ==
Funding comes from the National Science Foundation (NSF), New York Empire State Development's Division of Science, Technology, and Innovation (NYSTAR), and industrial partners.

== See also ==
- Lighting & Sound International
