= Chakragati mouse =

Transgenic mouse mutant

Chakragati mouse (ckr) is an insertional transgenic mouse mutant (Mus musculus) displaying hyperactive behaviour and circling. It is also deficient in prepulse inhibition, latent inhibition and has brain abnormalities such as lateral ventricular enlargement that are typical to endophenotypic models of schizophrenia, which make it useful in screening for antipsychotic drug candidates. The mouse is currently licensed by Chakra Biotech.
