= Mouse brain =

Body part used for neuroscience research

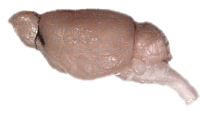
Mouse brain, lateral view

The mouse brain refers to the brain of Mus musculus. Various brain atlases for it exist.

Despite superficial differences, especially in size and weight, the mouse brain and its function can serve as a powerful animal model for study of human brain diseases or mental disorders (see e.g. Reeler, Chakragati mouse). This is because the genes responsible for building and operating both mouse and human brain are 90% identical. Transgenic mouse lines also allow neuroscientists to specifically target the labeling of certain cell types to probe the neural basis of fundamental processes.

== Anatomy ==
The cerebral cortex of a mouse has around 8–14 million neurons while in those humans there are more than 10–15 billion. The olfactory bulb volume takes about 2% of the mouse brain by volume in contrast to about 0.01% of the human brain.

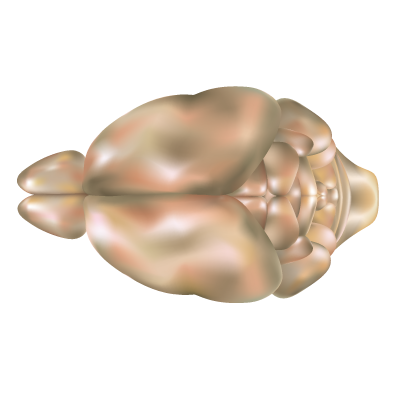
Mouse brain, dorsal view

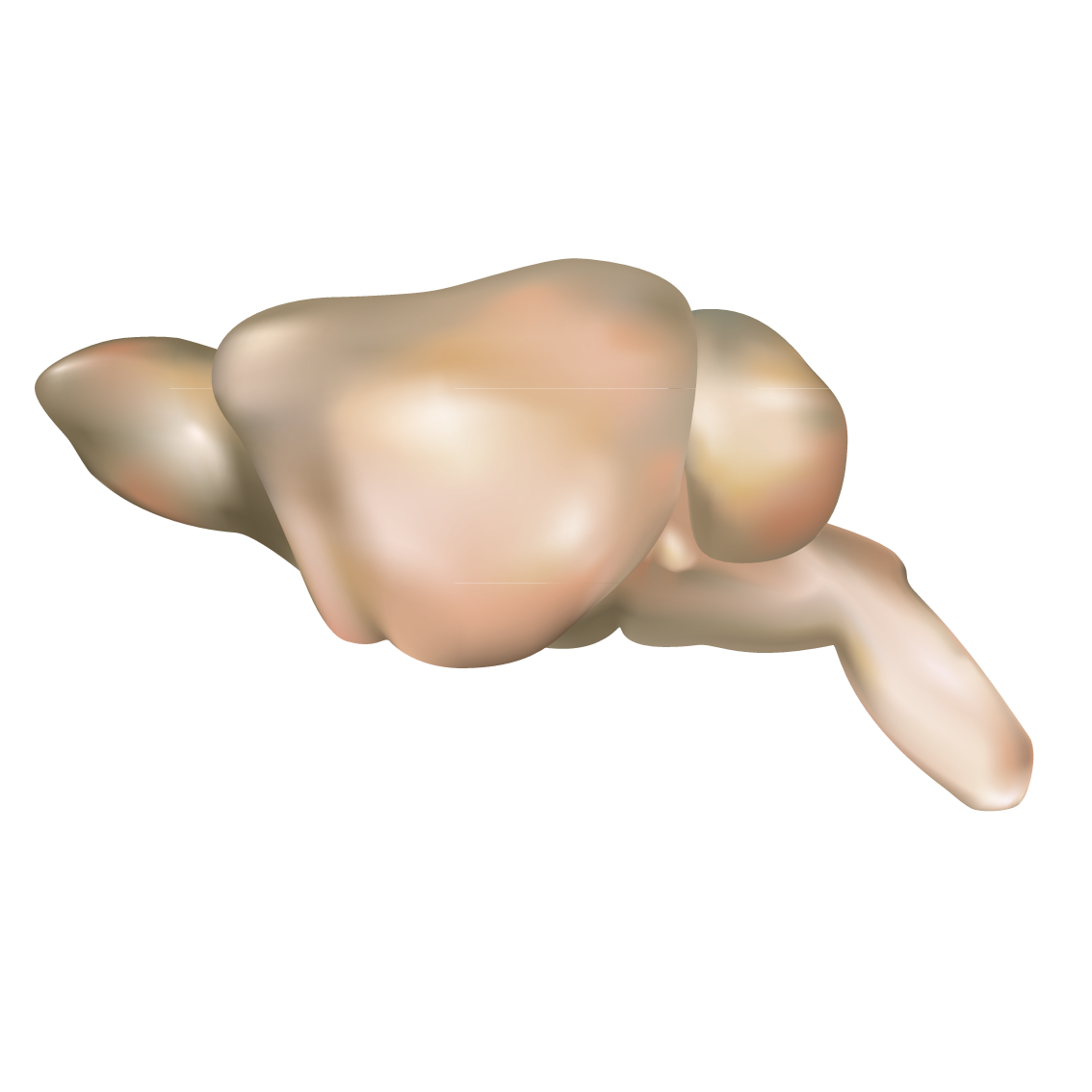
Mouse brain, lateral view

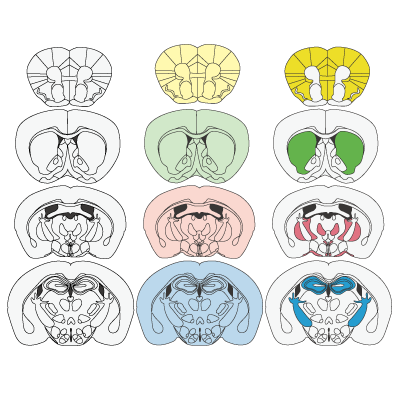
Mouse brain slices

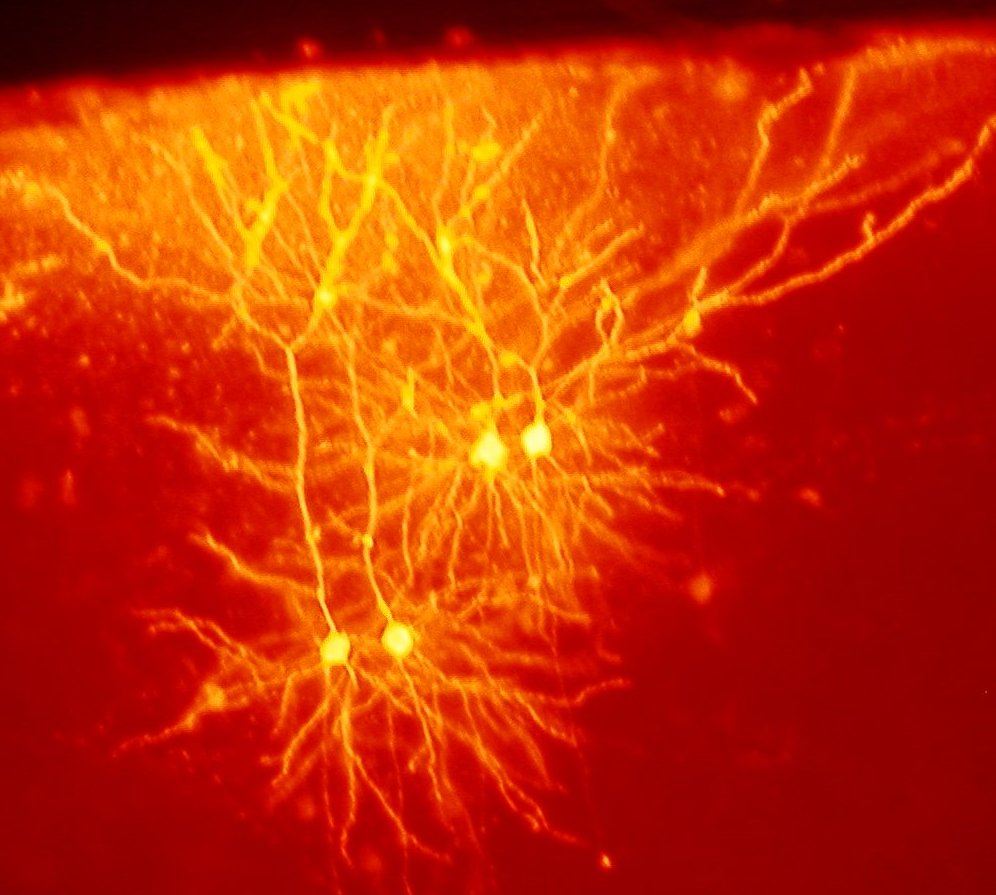
Mouse cingulate cortex neurons

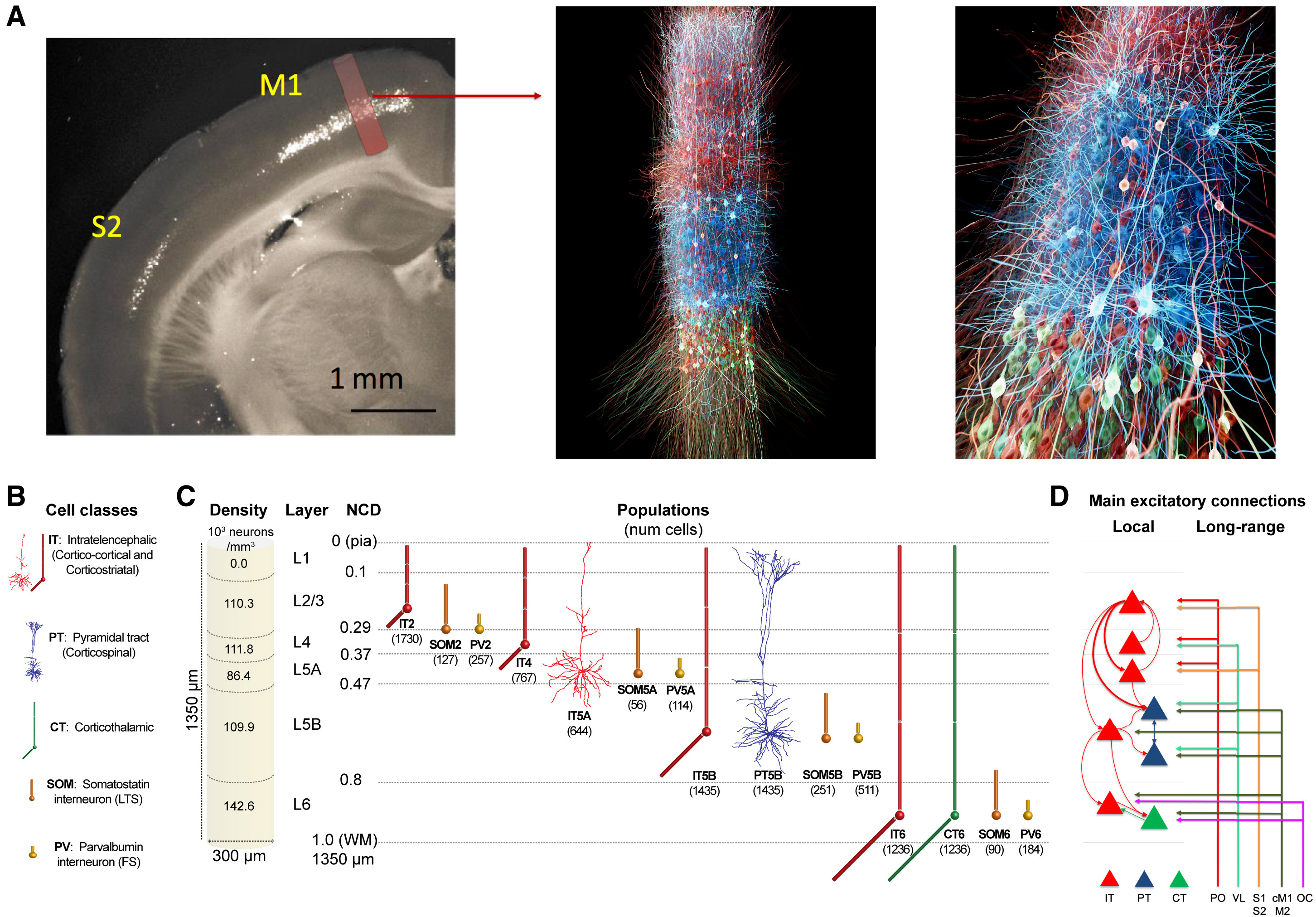
A biophysically realistic model of a mouse's primary motor cortex microcircuit

For reasons of reproducibility, genetically characterized, stable strains like C57BL/6 were chosen to produce high-resolution images and databases. Well known online resources include:

- Allen Brain Atlas
- Mouse Brain Library
- High resolution mouse brain atlas
- BrainMaps
  - High-Resolution Brain Maps and Brain Atlases of Mus musculus

== See also ==
- Mouse brain development timeline
- List of animals by number of neurons
