= Meaghan Creed =

Canadian Neuroscientist

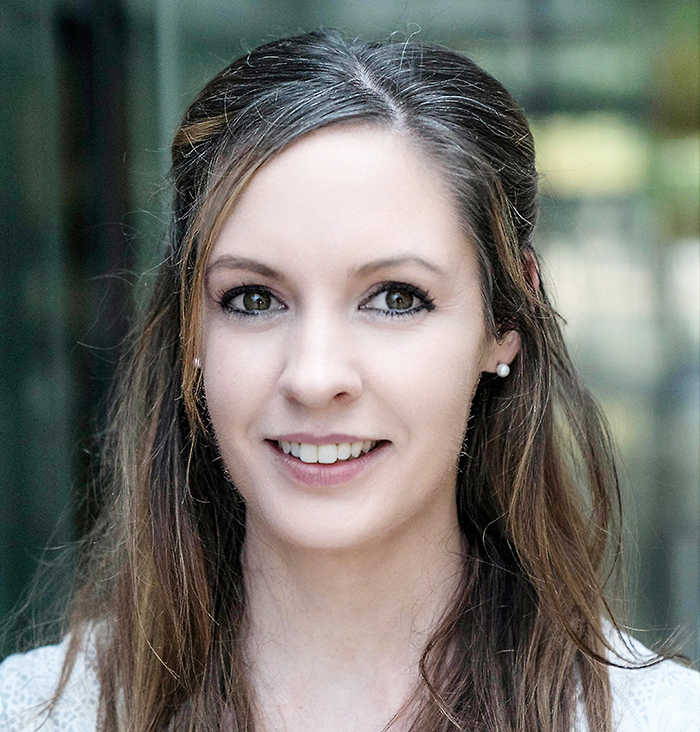
- Born: Chatham, Ontario, Canada
- Education: University of Toronto
- Known for: Using Deep Brain Stimulation (DBS) to modulate neural circuitry
- Awards: 2019 Rita Allen Foundation Scholar Award in Pain, NARSAD Young Investigator Grant, Brain and Behavior Research Foundation, American College of Neuropsychopharmacology, 2017 Science AAAS-PINS Inaugural Prize In Neuromodulation, 2016 Prix Pfizer de le Recherche / Pfizer Research Prize for Outstanding Translational
- Scientific career
- Fields: Neuroscience
- Workplaces: Washington University in St. Louis

Meaghan Creed is a Canadian neuroscientist and associate professor of anesthesiology at Washington University School of Medicine. Creed has conducted research on understanding and optimizing deep brain stimulation in the basal ganglia for the treatment of neurological and psychiatric disorders. Her work has been recognized at the national and international level by Pfizer, the American Association for the Advancement of Science (AAAS), the Whitehall Foundation, Brain and Behavior Research Foundation and the Rita Allen Foundation.

== Early life and education ==
Creed grew up in Chatham, Ontario, Canada, on the banks of Lake St. Clair. She attended the McNaughton Avenue Public School and became interested in biology as early as grade 2 when a scientist came into her classroom to talk about genetically engineered corn. She completed high school at Chatham-Kent Secondary School. Creed says that her physics, biology, and chemistry teachers helped to motivate her to pursue biology in her undergraduate degree. Creed moved to Toronto in 2004 to conduct undergraduate research at the University of Toronto Scarborough Campus. She graduated in 2008 with an Honours Bachelor of Science. Creed stayed with the University of Toronto for her graduate studies, but moved downtown to conduct research at the Center for Addiction and Mental Health under Jose N. Nobrega. Her graduate studies explored deep brain stimulation (DBS) in treating movement disorders. Creed completed her PhD in pharmacology and neuroscience in 2012.

Creed completed her postdoctoral work at the University of Geneva in the Department of Basic Neuroscience She worked under Christian Lüscher, where she learned techniques such as optogenetics and electrophysiology in models of cocaine addiction. Her postdoctoral work used DBS to reduce synaptic plasticity in the mesolimbic reward circuitry in response to cocaine addiction.

=== Deep brain stimulation ===
Early into Creed's PhD, she explored the neural substrates driving tardive dyskinesia (TD), a late-onset side effect of taking long-term antipsychotics, and found that structural synaptic alterations are probably not the underlying cause of the disorder. These findings suggested alternative functional neuroplastic changes as a cause of TD, so Creed decided to explore the possibility of alleviating TD with deep brain stimulation (DBS). Strikingly, Creed found that DBS at 130 Hz applied specifically to the entopeduncular nucleus (EPN) or the subthalamic nucleus (STN) was effective at reducing symptoms of TD in a mouse model. Her findings showed that DBS might provide therapeutic relief to patients with drug-induced dyskinesias. In her thesis work, Creed further showed that the changes caused by DBS are not the same as pharmacological inactivation, that DBS in the STN decreases serotonin output of dorsal raphe neurons, and that modulation of dopamine release is not related to the anti-dyskinetic effects of DBS. Creeds explorations of how DBS impacts neural activity and neural circuitry established some of the first findings into the mechanisms of DBS as well as providing a model with which to further study them.

After defending her thesis, Creed published several more papers highlighting her graduate DBS findings. Creed highlighted the immediate early genetic changes that result from DBS treatment and found that DBS stimulation of the EPN caused increases in immediate early gene mRNA, a marker of increased activity, in the basal ganglia, but decreases in the thalamus and motor cortex, while stimulation to the STN decreased immediate early gene mRNA levels in all basal ganglia structures, the thalamus, and the motor cortex. These results suggest that divergent neuroanatomic mechanisms in the EPN and STN, upon DBS stimulation, lead to similar behavioral outcomes.

In her postdoctoral work, Creed studied DBS in the context of drug addiction in the Lüscher Lab at the University of Geneva. In the context of cocaine addiction, drug-adaptive behavior is driven by remodelling of the brain's reward circuitry, specifically plasticity of the excitatory inputs onto dopaminergic ventral tegmental area neurons. Creed and her colleagues found that cocaine administration leads to long-lasting increases in burst firing due to impaired function of calcium activated small conductance potassium channels (SK channels). Creed found that cocaine exposure drove insertion of GluN3A-containing NMDAR onto VTA dopamine neurons which impaired their excitability and prevented the activation of the SK channels.

After exploring the synaptic level changes that occur in dopamine neurons in addiction models, Creed was ready to test if DBS could help to reverse these plasticity changes and relieve symptoms of addiction. In a first author paper in Science, Creed reported that acute low frequency stimulation via DBS can mimic previous findings with optogenetics in which stimulation reverses the synaptic changes that led to addiction. This finding was one of the first to show that DBS can be used like optogenetics to cause synaptic level and behavioral changes in mice, a finding that increases the translational potential of optogenetic studies.

== Career and research ==
After her postdoctoral work in Switzerland, Creed came back to North America in 2016 as she was recruited to be an Assistant Professor of Pharmacology at the University of Maryland School of Medicine. Creed's lab at the University of Maryland focused on probing the neural circuitry underlying reward-seeking, risk tolerance, impulsivity, and anhedonia in order to one day develop strategies to modulate these circuits in a therapeutic manner.

Creed was recruited to Washington University School of Medicine in October 2018, where she now holds the title of Associate Professor of Anesthesiology, Psychiatry and Neuroscience and runs her lab in the Washington University Pain Center. Creed's lab focuses on developing novel neuromodulatory approaches to treat brain related disorders such as depression, chronic pain, and addiction. The types of neuromodulatory therapies her lab focuses on are deep brain stimulation, targeted drug delivery, and neurostimulation.

The first paper published by the Creed Lab in 2018 explored the distinct population of Glutamatergic ventral pallidum (VP) neurons and their role in reward seeking behavior. Creed and her team found that VP neurons have excitatory projections to lateral habenula, rostromedial tegmental nucleus, and GABAergic VTA neurons. They also found that selective activation of this subpopulation of VP glutamatergic neurons induced place avoidance suggesting their role in constraining reward seeking behavior. Continuing to explore the VP, Creed and her team looked at the role of the GABAergic VP neurons in appetitive and aversive behavior. They first explored human imaging studied to look at the role of the VP in the human brain and found that it tracks reward-sensitivity and motivation to seek rewards. They further found that a subsection of the VP seemed to be implicated in processing aversive information. They mimicked these findings in the rodent brain using in vivo electrophysiology and behavioral pharmacology which poses the question as to how the mechanisms by which the VP is able to elicit such distinct behavioral outputs, aversive or appetitive behaviors, when it plays a role in both. Their findings set up the anatomical and molecular background for future studies to probe these questions.

Her lab also is a proponent of Open Science. In 2018, they developed an Open Source lickometer, that allows scientists to easily detect when mice lick for specific substances in self administration and sucrose preference tasks. They made the instructions, the code and the schematics all open source. Further, in 2019, they received funding from the McDonnell Center for Systems Neuroscience at Washington University in St. Louis, in addition to donations from the WashU Pain Center and Anesthesiology Division of Basic Research to support a series of workshops to introduce people to open source techniques like DeepLabCut, co developed by Mackenzie Mathis and Alexander Mathis, Bonsai, and Arduino.

== Awards and honors ==
- 2019 Rita Allen Foundation Scholar Award in Pain
- Daniel X. Freedman Prize, Brain and Behavior Research Foundation - Cellular adaptations underlying learned helplessness behavior
- 2017 Science AAAS-PINS Inaugural Prize In Neuromodulation
- 2016 Prix Pfizer de le Recherch / Pfizer Research Prize for Outstanding Translational Research

== Select publications ==
- Vachez YM*, Tooley JR*, Abiraman K, Matikainen-Ankney BA, Casey E, Earnest T, Ramos LM, Silberberg H, Godynyuk E, Uddin O, Marconi L, Le Pichon CE, Creed MC. Ventral arkypallidal neurons inhibit accumbal firing to promote reward consumption. Nat Neurosci. 2021 24:379–390.
- Fobbs WC, Bariselli S, Licholai JA, Miyazaki NL, Matikainen-Ankney BA, Creed MC, Kravitz AV. Continuous representations of speed by striatal medium spiny neurons. J Neurosci. 2020 Feb 19;40(8):1679-1688.
- Godynyuk E, Bluitt MN, Tooley JR, Kravitz AV, Creed MC. An open-source, automated, home-cage sipper device for monitoring liquid ingestive behavior in rodents. eNeuro. 2019. 10;6(5).
- Tooley J, Marconi L, Alipio JB, Matikainen-Ankney B, Georgiou P, Kravitz AV, Creed M. Glutamatergic ventral pallidal neurons modulate activity of the habenula - tegmental circuitry and constrain reward seeking. Biological Psychiatry. 2018.
- Creed MC. Current and emerging neuromodulation therapies for addiction: insight from pre-clinical studies. Current Opinion in Neurobiology. 2018.
- Creed M, Pascoli VP, Lüscher C. Refining deep brain stimulation to emulate optogenetic treatment of synaptic pathology. Science. 2015. 347(6222):659-64.
- Creed M, Ntamati R, Chandra R, Lobo MK, Lüshcer C. Convergence of rewarding and anhedonic effects of cocaine in the ventral pallidum. Neuron. 2016. 92(1): 214–226.
- Lee D*, Creed M*, Jung K*, Wendler DJ, Oh WC, Mignocchi NL, Lüscher C, and Kwon HB. Temporally precise labeling and control of neuromodulatory circuits in the mammalian brain. Nature Methods. 2017. 14(5):495-503.
- Creed MC, Hamani C, Nobrega JN. Effects of repeated deep brain stimulation on depressive- and anxiety-like behavior in rats: comparing entopeduncular and subthalamic nuclei. Brain Stimulation. 2012. 6(4):506-14.
- Creed MC, Hamani C, Bridgeman A, Fletcher PJ, Nobrega JN. Contribution of decreased serotonin release to the antidyskinetic effects of deep brain stimulation in a rodent model of tardive dyskinesia: comparison of the subthalamic and entopeduncular nuclei. Journal of Neuroscience. 2012. 32(28)9874-81.
- Creed MC, Hamani C, Nobrega JN. Early gene mapping after deep brain stimulation in a rat model of tardive dyskinesia: comparison with transient local inactivation. European Journal of Neuropsychopharmacology. 2011. 22(7):506-517.
