= Nenad Ban =

Croatian biochemist

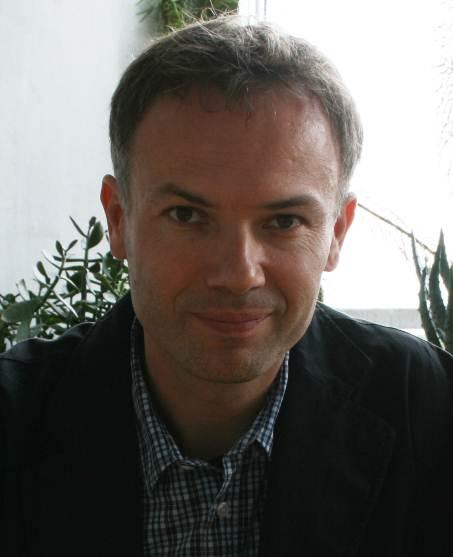
- Born: 3 May 1966 (age 60); Zagreb, Croatia
- Education: University of Zagreb, Croatia, University of California at Riverside
- Known for: Structural biology, structure and function of the ribosome, structure and function of multi-enzymes
- Spouse: Eilika Weber-Ban
- Awards: Newcomb Cleveland Prize (2001); Rössler Prize (2009); Heinrich Wieland Prize (2010); Ernst Jung Prize (2017); Otto Naegeli Prize (2018)
- Scientific career
- Fields: Biochemistry and Biophysics
- Workplaces: ETH Zurich
- Doctoral advisor: Alexander McPherson
- Other academic advisors: Thomas A. Steitz

Nenad Ban is a biochemist born in Zagreb, Croatia who currently works at the ETH Zurich, Swiss Federal Institute of Technology, as a professor of Structural Molecular Biology. He is a pioneer in studying gene expression mechanisms and the participating protein synthesis machinery.

== Career ==
Nenad Ban was born in 1966 in Zagreb. His parents, Jasna and Zvonimir, were scientists and university professors. He received a degree in molecular biology at the Faculty of Science, University of Zagreb and decided to continue with his studies in the United States where he obtained a PhD degree at the University of California, Riverside in the laboratory of Alexander McPherson. He carried out his postdoctoral studies at Yale University in the laboratory of Thomas A. Steitz.

Already in high school he developed an interest in understanding the mechanisms of protein synthesis, which led him to the laboratory of Prof. Zeljko Kucan and Ivana Weygand in Zagreb where he investigated tRNA synthetases, enzymes that charge tRNAs with amino acids to prepare them as substrates for protein synthesis on the ribosome. These interests brought him to the Department of Molecular Biophysics and Biochemistry at Yale University where he determined the atomic structure of the large ribosomal subunit by X-ray crystallography, as part of the group in the laboratory of Thomas A. Steitz. These results demonstrated that the ribosome is a ribozyme.

Since 2000 Nenad Ban is a professor of structural molecular biology at the ETH Zurich. (Swiss Federal Institute of Technology). His group is investigating protein synthesis both in terms of the chemistry of the process and with respect to how it is regulated, how proteins co-translationally fold, how they are co-translationally modified, and how they are targeted to membranes and sorted to different cellular compartments.

Nenad Ban’s group at ETH Zurich revealed the mechanisms behind the key steps in eukaryotic cytoplasmic and mitochondrial translation with a broad impact on a wide range of fields in biology, chemistry and biomedicine.

His group also contributed to our understanding of giant multifunctional enzymes involved in fatty acid synthesis offering mechanistic insights into substrate shuttling and delivery in such megasynthases.

== Honors ==
Nenad Ban is a member of the National Academy of Sciences, the European Molecular Biology Organization (EMBO), the German Academy of Sciences, the Croatian Academy of Arts and Sciences and the recipient of several prizes and awards including the Heinrich Wieland Prize, Rössler Prize of the ETH Zurich, the Latsis prize, the Friedrich Miescher Prize of the Swiss Society for Biochemistry, Spiridon Brusina medal, the AAAS Newcomb Cleveland Prize. and the Jung Prize.

== Personal life ==
Ban is married to Eilika Weber, a German scientist whom he met in the United States during his doctoral study. They have two sons, Arvid and Ivo.
