= Eilika =

Eilika is a feminine given name. Notable people with the given name include:

- Eilika of Saxony (c. 1080–1142), daughter of Magnus, Duke of Saxony, and wife of Otto, Count of Ballenstedt
- Eilika of Schweinfurt (c. 1005–after 1059), daughter of Henry of Schweinfurt, Margrave of the Nordgau, and wife of Bernard II, Duke of Saxony
- Eilika Weber-Ban (born 1968), German biochemist
