= Kitty Ponse =

Swiss zoologist and endocrinologist (1897–1982)

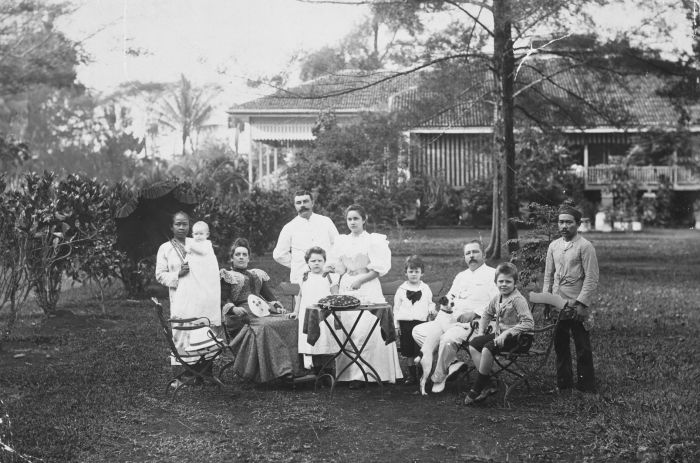
Portrait of the Ponse family from the Tropenmuseum. Kitty Ponse is the baby pictured on the left.

Kitty Ponse (5 September 1897 – 10 February 1982) was a Swiss zoologist and endocrinologist. She was a professor at the University of Geneva and received the Swiss Otto Naegeli Prize in 1961.

== Life and career ==
Ponse was born in Sumatra, then part of the Dutch East Indies, to Dutch parents in 1897. At the age of eight she and her family moved to Geneva, Switzerland, where she later studied science at the University of Geneva. She completed a doctoral thesis at the University of Geneva in 1922 that focused on embryological development. While the focus of her earlier research and publications was pure zoology, including tail regeneration in lizards, she later developed a particular interest in sex determination and sexual differentiation in amphibians. In the mid-1920s, she conducted experiments in which she successfully inverted the sex of toads; The New York Times carried a story about Ponse's work in 1926 with the headline "Says she changes the sex of toads". Her work on sexual differentiation in vertebrates was compiled in her 1949 book La différenciation du sexe et l'intersexualité.

Ponse's other publications in the field of endocrinology addressed the function of the thyroid gland, the biochemical pathways in steroid hormone production, the communication between the pituitary gland and the gonads. She also collaborated with French biologist Émile Guyénot on the first purifications of gonadotropin hormones from the pituitary. Ponse taught at the University of Geneva for over forty years and was appointed a professor of experimental endocrinology in 1961. She received the Otto Naegeli Prize in 1961 and the Montyon Prize of the French Academy of Sciences in 1950. She was a cofounder of the journal Acta Endocrinologica in 1948.

In 2022, a street was renamed for her in Geneva (from rue de l’Université to rue Kitty-Ponse).
