= Walter Wahli =

Swiss biologist

- Wahli in 2026
- Born: 23 May 1946 (age 80); Moutier, Switzerland
- Citizenship: Swiss
- Education: University of Bern
- Known for: Work on Peroxisome Proliferator-Activated Receptors
- Awards: Otto Naegeli Prize (2002); European Federation of Lipid Research Award (2002); Hartmann Müller Prize (2008); Life Time Achievement Award (2011); Chaire d’Excellence Pierre de Fermat (2013)
- Scientific career
- Fields: Nuclear Hormone Receptors and gene expression; Energy metabolism
- Workplaces: Nanyang Technological University University of Lausanne

Walter Wahli,(born 23 May 1946) is a Swiss biologist and professor emeritus at the University of Lausanne. His research focuses on how nuclear hormone receptors regulate gene expression. He is best known for his work on peroxisome proliferator-activated receptors (PPARs), which regulate lipid and glucose metabolism and inflammation. He has also held academic positions at Nanyang Technological University in Singapore.

== Early life and education ==
Wahli was born in Moutier, in the Bernese Jura region of Switzerland. He attended primary school in Perrefitte and secondary school in Moutier, trained as a primary school teacher at the École normale des instituteurs in Porrentruy (1963–1967), and taught at a primary school in Corcelles until 1969. He then studied biological sciences at the University of Bern, earning a biology diploma in 1975 and a PhD in February 1977. His doctoral work, conducted in the laboratory of Rudolf Weber, examined how the hormone estrogen switches on the production of the yolk protein vitellogenin in the liver of the African clawed frog (Xenopus laevis ). After his PhD, he worked as a postdoctoral researcher with Igor Dawid at the Department of Embryology of the Carnegie Institution of Washington in Baltimore, and then as a visiting fellow and visiting associate at the National Cancer Institute, National Institutes of Health (NIH), in Bethesda, Maryland.

== Career ==
In 1980 Wahli returned to Switzerland as a full professor and director of the Institute of Animal Biology at the University of Lausanne, a post he held until 2002.He served as president of the university’s department of Biology (1991–1993) and as vice-rector for research, postgraduate and continuing education (1999–2003). In 2002, he became founding director of the Center for Integrative Genomics, where he was a full professor until 2011 and is now professor emeritus. From 2012, he was associated with the Lee Kong Chian School of Medicine, a medical school of Nanyang Technological University in Singapore [WW1], first as a visiting professor, then as professor of metabolic disease (2013–2019), and again as visiting professor (2019–2024). He also held a Chaire d’Excellence Pierre de Fermat in Toulouse, France, in 2014–2015.

Science policy and funding bodies

Wahli has served on several Swiss and international science bodies. These include the National Research Council of the Swiss National Science Foundation (1996–2006), where he also presided over the Biology and Medicine division (2004–2006); the Swiss Science and Technology Council (2008–2013), with vice-presidency 2012–2013) and the board of trustees of the Fondation Louis Jeantet (2005–2013). He was a member of the council of the Nestlé Foundation for the Study of Problems of Nutrition in the World from 2012 and served as its president from 2016 to 2018..

Research

Wahli’s research focuses on nuclear receptors, proteins inside cells that bind steroid hormones, fatty acids, and other fat-soluble molecules. Once activated, they switch specific genes on or off. Through this mechanism, they influence embryonic development, homeostasis, metabolism, and several other processes in vertebrates.

Vitellogenin genes and the estrogen receptor

Wahli’s early work used estrogen-induced vitellogenin production in Xenopus as a model for hormone-controlled gene expression. With colleagues, he measured how vitellogenin messenger RNA accumulates in the liver after estrogen treatment.During his time at the Carnegie Institution and the NIH, he and Igor Dawid showed that vitellogenin is encoded by a small family of four closely related genes, and isolated two of them from a Xenopus gene library that he produced. A comparison of two of these genes described their complex exon-intron structure. At Lausanne, his group went on to study the DNA sequences through which the estrogen receptor controls gene expression, known as estrogen response elements, and how they work as hormone-dependent enhancers.

Together with the group of Pierre Chambon, they reported that the N-terminal DNA-binding “zinc finger” of the oestrogen and glucocorticoid receptors determines target gene specificity. [16] His group also developed a hormone-responsive in vitro transcription system from Xenopus liver nuclear extracts and, with Alan Wolffe, studied how a positioned nucleosome affects estrogen-regulated transcription from the vitellogenin promoter.

==== Evolution of yolk protein genes ====
In a study with Henrik Kaessmann and David Brawand, Wahli examined the evolutionary history of vitellogenin genes. The authors reported that placental mammals lost the yolk protein genes that birds retain, and proposed that the evolution of lactation and placentation reduced the need for yolk-based nutrition.

==== Discovery of the PPARs ====
In the early 1990s Wahli’s group searched for new members of the nuclear receptor family. This search led to the identification, in Xenopus, of a small family of three receptors that control the peroxisomal β-oxidation pathway of fatty acid breakdown. These became known as the peroxisome proliferator-activated receptors α, β/δ and γ (PPARα, PPARβ/δ and PPARγ). Subsequent work by Wahli’s laboratory and others showed that fatty acids and certain eicosanoids bind to and activate PPARs, indicating that fatty acids and fatty acid derivatives can regulate gene expression through a mechanism similar to that of steroid hormones. Later studies linked PPARα to an inflammatory pathway involving leukotriene B4 and to the body’s adaptation to fasting, in which it promotes fatty acid oxidation in the liver. Wahli co-authored review articles that summarized the field, including a widely cited 1999 review of PPARs and metabolism.

==== PPARs in skin, diverse tissues and metabolic disease ====
Work from Wahli’s laboratory with Liliane Michalik and colleagues found that mice lacking PPARα or PPARβ/δ heal skin wounds poorly, implicating these receptors in the response of skin cells to injury and inflammation. A later study with Nguan Soon Tan and colleagues described a role for PPARβ/δ in signalling between epithelial and mesenchymal cells in skin. Other collaborations examined PPARs in fat tissue, skeletal muscle, blood vessels and the pancreas.

==== Liver, nutrition and the gut ====
A large part of Wahli’s later research, with Béatrice Desvergne, Manuel Vázquez-Carrera and Hervé Guillou concerns the liver. His group reported that PPARα represses certain liver genes in females but not in males, a sex-specific mechanism that protects against estrogen-induced liver damage in mice. Other studies described how a hormonal pathway activated around birth prepares the newborn liver to metabolise the fat in milk, showed that liver PPARα protects against metabolic dysfunction–associated steatotic liver disease (MASLD), and examined the role of PPARβ/δ in the progression of the disease. He has also collaborated on studies of how diet and caloric restriction affect the small intestine and its microbiota, and on the influence of gut bacteria on skeletal muscle in mice. Wahli has argued that PPARs are promising drug targets for NAFLD, which is frequently associated with metabolic syndrome and type 2 diabetes.

==== Patents ====
Wahli is a named inventor on patents assigned to Actigenomics SA, including “Composition for regulating lipid metabolism” (US patent granted 2013) and “Composition for enhancing immunity” (European patent, published 2019).

== Honors and memberships ==
- Elected member, Institut jurassien des sciences, des lettres et des arts (1988)
- Elected member, European Molecular Biology Organization (1998)
- Otto Naegeli Prize (2002)
- European Federation of Lipid Research Award (2002)
- Elected individual member, Swiss Academy of Medical Sciences (2007)
- Hartmann Müller Prize (2008)
- Lifetime Achievement Award, Faculty of Biology and Medicine, University of Lausanne (2011)
- Ming K. Jeang Award for Excellence, Cell & Bioscience (2012) [Cell Biosci. 2013 May 23;3(1):23. doi: 10.1186/2045-3701-3-23.]
- Chaire d’Excellence Pierre de Fermat, Région Midi-Pyrénées, Toulouse (awarded 2013, held 2014–2015)
- Elected “Correspondant Étranger” (Foreign correspondent) of the Académie des Sciences, Inscriptions et Belles-Lettres of Toulouse https://www.academie-sciences-lettres-toulouse.fr/ Wahli has also served on the editorial or advisory boards of several journals and has guest-edited special issues on PPARs and liver disease in the International Journal of Molecular Sciences and Metabolites.

== Selected publications ==
- Desvergne B, Wahli W (1999). Peroxisome proliferator-activated receptors: nuclear control of metabolism. Endocrine Reviews 20(5): 649688.
- Braissant O, Foufelle F, Scotto C, Dauça M, Wahli W (1996). Differential expression of peroxisome proliferator-activated receptors (PPARs): tissue distribution of PPAR-alpha,-beta and -gamma in the adult rat. Endocrinology 137(1): 354–366.
- Kliewer SA, et al., including Wahli W (1997). Fatty acids and eicosanoids regulate gene expression through direct interactions with peroxisome proliferator-activated receptors α and γ. PNAS 94(9): 4318–4323.
- Kersten S, Desvergne B, Wahli W (2000). Roles of PPARs in health and disease. Nature 405(6785): 421–424.
- Kersten S, Seydoux J, Peters JM, Gonzalez FJ, Desvergne B, Wahli W (1999). Peroxisome proliferator–activated receptor α mediates the adaptive response to fasting. Journal of Clinical Investigation 103(11): 1489–1498.
- Brawand D, Wahli W, Kaessmann H (2008). Loss of egg yolk genes in mammals and the origin of lactation and placentation. PLoS Biology 6(3): e63.
- Rando G, et al., including Wahli W (2016). Glucocorticoid receptor-PPARα axis in fetal mouse liver prepares neonates for milk lipid catabolism. eLife 5: e11853.
- Montagner A, Polizzi A, Fouché E, Ducheix S, Lippi Y, Lasserre F, Barquissau V, Régnier M, Lukowicz C, Benhamed F, Iroz A, Bertrand-Michel J. Al Saati T, Cano P, Lakhal L, Mithieux G, Rajas F, Lagarrigue S, Pineau T, Loiseau N, Postic C, Langin D, Wahli W, Guillou H (2016). Liver PPARα is crucial for whole body fatty acid homeostasis and protects from NAFLDs. Gut 65(7):1202–1214.
- Zarei M, Barroso E, Palomer X, Dai J, Rada P, Quesada-López T, Escola-Gil JC, Cedó L, Zali MR, Molaei M, Dabiri R, Vazquez S, Pujol E, Valverde A, Villarroya F, Liu Y, Wahli W, Vázquez-Carrera M (2018). Hepatic regulation of VLDL receptor by PPARβ/δ and FGF21 modulates non-alcoholic fatty liver disease. Molecular Metabolism 8, 117–131.
