= Chatham-Kent Secondary School =

Canadian school

Chatham Kent Secondary School
- CKSS Golden Hawks

Location
- 285 McNaughton Avenue East; Chatham, Ontario, N7L 2G7; Canada; 42.42178°N 82.19175°W

Information
- School type: Public
- Founded: 1963
- School board: Lambton Kent District School Board
- Principal: Benjamin Lawton
- Grades: 9 to 12
- Enrollment: 1,257
- Language: English and French Immersion
- Area: Chatham, Ontario
- Colours: Blue and gold
- Team name: Golden Hawks
- Website: www.lkdsb.net/school/CKSS/Pages/default.aspx

Chatham Kent Secondary School is located in Chatham-Kent, Ontario, Canada. With a student population of about 1,250, it is the largest public secondary school in Chatham-Kent operating at 90% capacity. The school underwent renovations. The student population is projected to increase with further school consolidations, and the potential closure of John McGregor Secondary School.

== Sports ==
=== Volleyball ===
The CKSS Golden Hawks have won 15 OFSAA volleyball titles, ten by boys' teams and five by girls' teams. In 2015, the 1989–1990 boys' team was inducted into the Chatham Sports Hall of Fame.

=== Hockey ===
In March 2020, the boys' hockey team won the AAA SWOSSAA Championship by defeating the defending champions, Villanova, in Windsor, Ontario.

=== Track and field ===
Runner Emma Pegg has won a number of awards and set records both during and after her time at CKSS - ranking in the top 250 in the world in the 800m, and the top 750 in the 1500m. As a member of the Golden Hawks team, Pegg was the runner-up for the 2018 Chatham-Kent Female Athlete of the Year award, which she won in 2019.

In 2019 she was also selected as a member of Team Canada.

In 2021, CKSS Golden Hawks Logan Smith and Emma Pegg were co-winners of the Dr. Jack Parry Award.

== Arts ==
CKSS has received awards at the annual Sears Drama Festival.

The school’s competitive dance team was founded by Melanie Rich (née Randall) in 2002. It has received awards at the Ontario Secondary School DanceFest and other private dance competitions.

== Student publications ==
The school newspaper is The CKSS Gazette (previously published occasionally as The CK Gazette).

== Notable alumni ==
Alumni of CKSS include:

- Meaghan Creed, neuroscientist
- Ron Sparks, comedian and writer

== 50th anniversary ==
Over Victoria Day weekend in 2013, the school and the city of Chatham held events to mark the school's 50th anniversary, including a dance and a show featuring graduates, produced by former teacher Bruce Nelson.

== See also ==
- Education in Ontario
- List of secondary schools in Ontario
