= Motor adaptation =

Form of motor learning

Motor adaptation, a form of motor learning, is the process of acquiring and restoring locomotor patterns (e.g. leg coordination patterns) through an error-driven learning process.

This type of adaptation is context-dependent and hence, is specific to the environment in which the adaptation occurred. The central nervous system, particularly the cerebellum, underlies this form of adaptation in vertebrates. It is suggested that the nervous system learns to predict and cancel effects of a novel environment, returning movements to near baseline (unperturbed) conditions. During motor adaptation the nervous system constantly uses error information to improve future movements.

== Split-Belt Adaptation ==
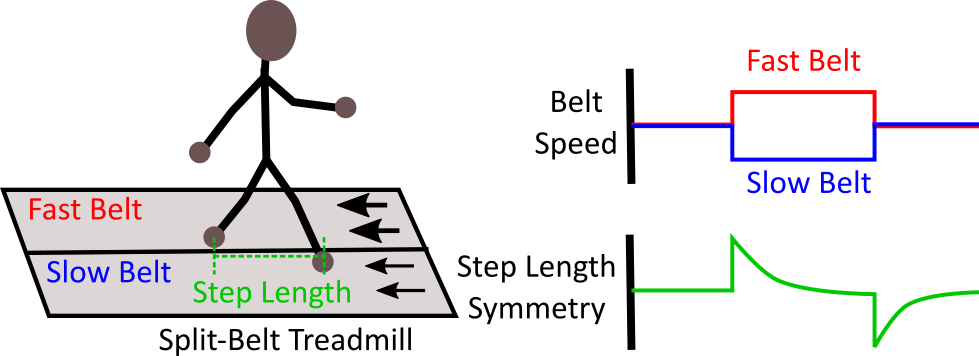
Schematic of motor adaptation. Depicted to the left is a cartoon representation of a subject walking on a split-belt treadmill during which the left leg is driven to walk slower than the right. Shown to the right is the process of split-belt adaptation which involves a disruption and then recovery of step length symmetry at the onset and termination (bottom right) of the change in speed across the left and right treadmill belts (top right)

Split-belt adaptation is a sub-type of motor adaptation in which the limbs on each side of the animal's body are driven at different speeds. This is achieved through the use of a split-belt treadmill that consists of two independently controlled treadmill belts. Animals undergoing split-belt adaptation adjust their interlimb coordination pattern to regain overall gait symmetry. Split-belt adaptation has a notable after-effect period (limbs driven at the same speed) in which the interlimb coordination pattern remains altered from that during the pre-adaptation period for some time after the split-belt perturbation period.

The after-effect, however, is context-dependent and therefore, will only exist in the same locomotor environment in which the adaptation had occurred. Moreover, split-belt adaptation has spatial (placement of the limb) and temporal (timing of limb movement) components that are dissociable at the behavioral and circuit level. The adaptation rates of the two components are different where the adaptation of the temporal component is faster than that of spatial component.

In vertebrates, the cerebellum is suggested to facilitate split-belt adaptation, and in mice, the interposed cerebellar nucleus is particularly crucial for this form of adaptation. Additionally, somatomotor regions of cerebral cortex in mice are shown to be not involved in split-belt adaptation. The split-belt adaptation paradigm is clinically important for aiding in the adjustment or recovery of impaired limb coordination patterns resulting from injury or pathologies, as well as understanding the specific aspects (e.g. temporal or spatial components) of gait that are disrupted in gait pathologies.

== After-effects ==
As demonstrated in the chart, when the environmental forces are removed, the subject reserves, for a limited time, the adaptive movement pattern (stage 4). This motor after-effect demonstrates that the learner does not merely react to environmental changes but also anticipates the expected dynamics of the new environment and moves according to a new set of expectations. Therefore, motor adaptation appears to rely on an update in the internal representation (internal model) of the external environment.

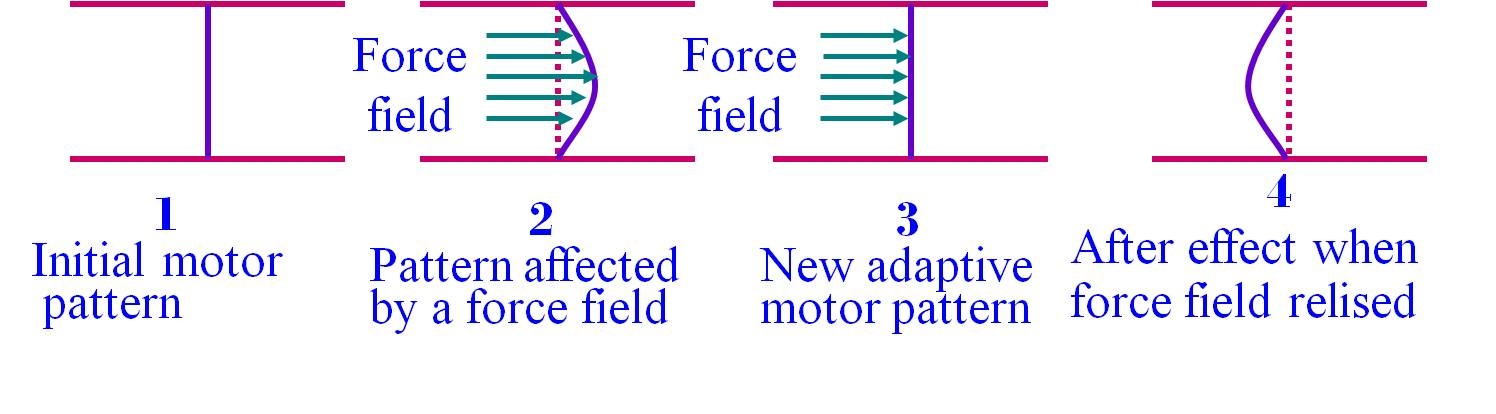
Motor Adaptation

== Internal model ==
The after-effects phenomena suggests that prior to the movement, the CNS generates an internal-model, a sort of internal-map that guides the body in the course of the movement, and adapt to environmental forces. This observation suggests that in programming the motor output to the muscles of the arm, the CNS uses an internal model (Wolpert et al., 1995b) to predict the mechanical dynamics of the task. Motor adaptation is a robust phenomenon and was also found in monkeys and mice performing motor tasks. Using optogenetics the study, done by Dr. Mackenzie Mathis at Harvard University, using mice could also show that somatosensory cortex is involved in updating the internal model.

== See also ==
- Motor learning
- Motor control
