= Otto Naegeli =

Otto Naegeli (born 9 July 1871 in Ermatingen; died 11 March 1938), was a Swiss hematologist. He was the brother of Oskar Naegeli.

He is best known for refining the classification of leukemia by dividing them into myelogenous and lymphocytic classes. He also made the observation that many individuals are infected with tuberculosis and do not develop the disease, which he attributed to differences in individual immune systems. While initially controversial, this was later demonstrated by others.

Every two years the Otto Naegeli Prize for the promotion of medical research is awarded to a scientist working in Switzerland who has made outstanding contributions to biomedical and/or clinical research and is likely to continue doing so. The prize is awarded by the Zurich based Bonizzi Theler Foundation and is named in honor of Otto Naegeli.
