= Nicolas H. Thomä =

German structural and chemical biologist

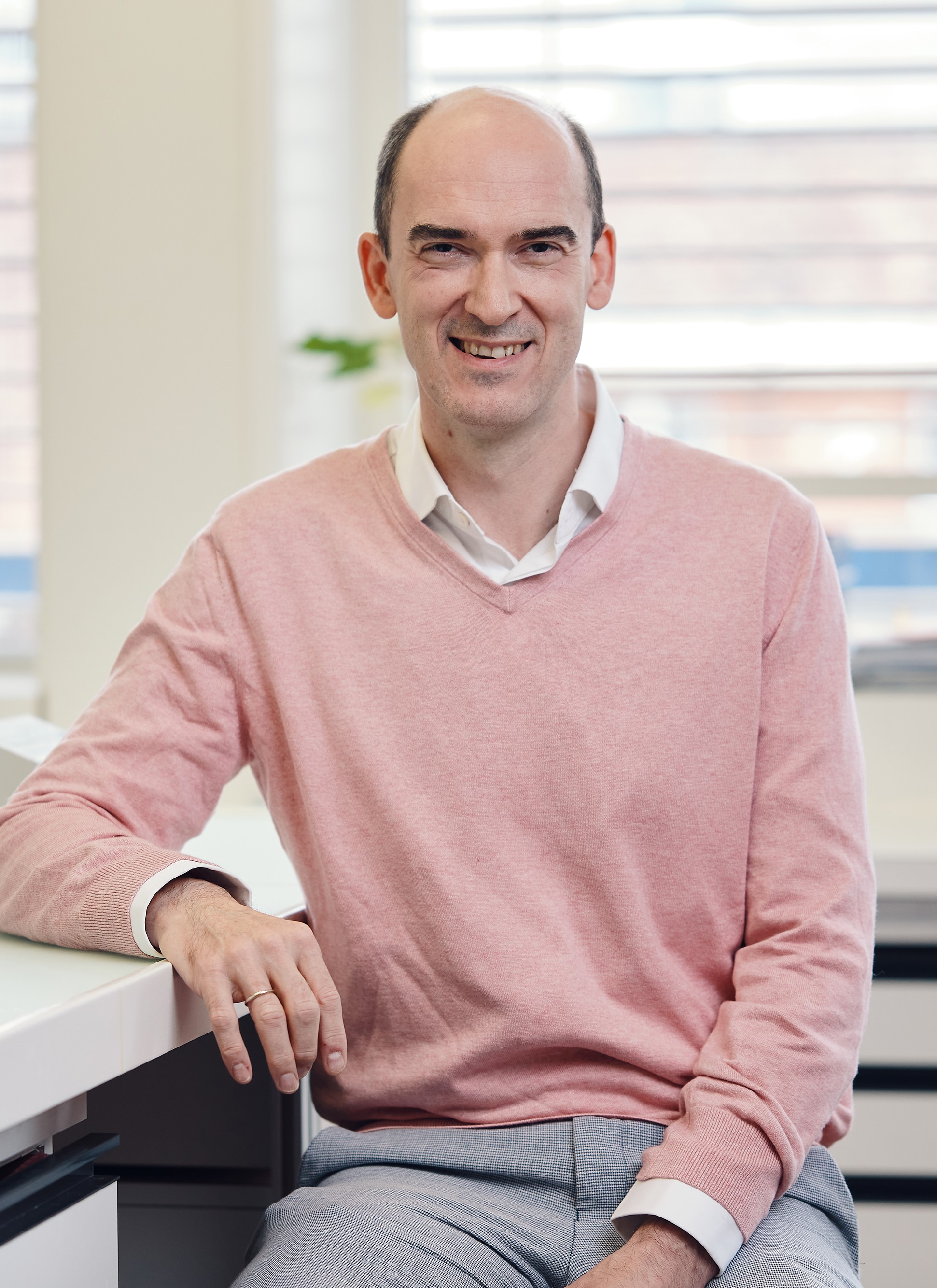
- Scientific career
- Fields: Chemical Biology; Structural Biology
- Workplaces: MRC - Laboratory of Molecular Biology University of Cambridge (UK); Max Planck Institute for Molecular Physiology; Memorial Sloan Kettering Cancer Center, New York; Friedrich Miescher Institute for Biomedical Research (FMI) EPFL
- Website: Thomä Lab

Nicolas H. Thomä is a German researcher, full professor at the EPFL School of Life Sciences and Director of the Paternot Chair for Cancer Research in Lausanne, Switzerland. He is a biochemist and structural biologist and a leading researcher in the fields of ubiquitin ligase biology and DNA repair.

== Education and career ==
Nicolas Thomä obtained his PhD from the University of Cambridge (UK), where he was advised jointly by Peter Leadlay (University of Cambridge) and Phil Evans (MRC-LMB Cambridge). He then worked as a postdoctoral fellow with Roger Goody (Max Planck Institute of Molecular Physiology, Germany) focusing on protein-ligand interactions. In 2001, he moved to the laboratory of Nikola Pavletich (Memorial Sloan Kettering Cancer Center, New York, USA) to complete his training in X-ray crystallography. In 2006, Nicolas Thomä joined the Friedrich Miescher Institute for Biomedical Research (FMI) in 2006 as a junior group leader and he was promoted to a senior group leader in 2012. He was appointed as full professor at EPFL's School of Life Sciences in 2023 where he holds the Paternot Chair in Interdisciplinary Cancer Research and aims to fast-track progress in translational oncology.

== Research ==
The laboratory of Nicolas Thomä investigates the structure and function of macromolecular machines that control genome stability, gene expression and DNA repair. His laboratory uses a multidisciplinary approach that includes biochemistry and cryogenic electron microscopy (cryo-EM) combined with genomics, imaging, and chemical-biology techniques. The research of his lab focuses on two areas: (i) the workings of DNA-binding proteins, particularly transcription factors, in the context of chromatin; and (ii) the link between chromatin and ubiquitin ligases. Thomä's laboratory has provided cryo-EM structures of pioneer transcription factors bound to their DNA motif embedded within the nucleosome. These findings illustrate how DNA-binding-proteins function in the nucleus of a eukaryotic cell, where the DNA is not present in its free form but is instead packaged into chromatin. Thomä's laboratory has also made contributions to the field of DNA repair by revealing the mechanisms through which eukaryotic cells recognize UV-induced DNA damage. Thomä's research further elucidated how Cullin–RING E3 ubiquitin ligases (CRLs) assemble to direct ~20% of proteasome-mediated protein degradation and how the activity of CRLs is controlled by the COP9 signalosome. This work provided a rationale for how these ubiquitin ligases work in DNA repair, cell signaling, cell division and differentiation, how they are deregulated in disease and how they can be drugged. A specific emphasis of Thomä's research has been on small-molecule therapeutics that target molecular machines for degradation. These molecules, called "molecular glues", work by inducing interactions between a ubiquitin ligase and a target protein. Such compounds have the potential to target proteins that are considered difficult to reach with conventional pharmacological approaches. Research from Thomä's laboratory advanced the understanding of how the molecular glue thalidomide and its analogues function at the molecular level. To date, thalidomide derivatives are among the most successful drugs for multiple myeloma and other blood cancers. Research from the laboratory has also revealed how other compounds can induce protein-protein interactions that lead to the degradation of target proteins. This work showed that small-molecule drugs can have an unanticipated gain-of-function activity of bringing proteins together, and that this property appears to be more common than previously known. These concepts can now be exploited in the design of novel drugs.

== Awards and honors ==
- 1999-2001: Long-Term-Fellowship, EMBO
- 2002-2005: Long-Term Fellowship, Human Frontiers Science Program
- 2006: Awarded Marie Curie Reintegration into Europe Fellowship
- 2010: Awarded ERC young investigator grant
- 2011: Elected member Network of Excellence EpiGeneSys
- 2012: Novartis VIVA Leading Scientist Award
- 2014: Election to Academia Europaea
- 2015: Election to EMBO
- 2015: Awarded ERC Advanced Grant
- 2019: Ted-X Basel talk
- 2020: Awarded ERC Advanced Grant
- 2022: Awarded Otto-Naegeli-Preis
