= Camilla Bellone =

Italian neuroscientist (born 1975)

- Born: 1975 (age 50–51); Italy
- Education: University of Milano, University of California, San Francisco
- Known for: mGluR induced LTD involves redistribution of AMPARs
- Scientific career
- Fields: Neuroscience
- Workplaces: University of Geneva

Camilla Bellone (born c. 1975) is an Italian neuroscientist and associate professor in the Department of Basic Neuroscience at the University of Geneva, in Switzerland. Bellone's laboratory explores the molecular mechanisms and neural circuits underlying social behavior and probes how defects at the molecular and circuit level give rise to psychiatric disease states such as Autism Spectrum Disorders.

== Early life and education ==
Bellone was born in Italy in 1975. Bellone studied pharmacology at the University of Milano in 1998, and found a mentor in Monica Di Luca, a neuropharmacologist. She completed her Master's in Pharmacy. Bellone became fascinated by neuroscience and developed a passion for answering the many unknown questions about brain function. In Di Luca's lab, Bellone studied protein-protein interactions and signalling pathways in the postsynaptic compartment as well as the role of PSD-95 in neuronal stability and homeostasis.

Bellone stayed at the University of Milano to begin her graduate studies exploring the molecular biology and structural composition of the synapse. Bellone realized that she wanted to go beyond protein-protein interactions and explore synaptic activity and dynamic function. Bellone reached out to Christian Lüscher at the University of Geneva because he was exploring synaptic plasticity and synaptic transmission. Lüscher accepted Bellone into his lab and the University of Milan continue to fund her PhD abroad, so Bellone moved to Geneva. After officially joining the Lüscher Lab in 2002, Bellone began studying synaptic physiology in the context of drug addiction. Bellone learned new techniques in electrophysiology by studying μ-opioid receptor physiology at the synapse and was then ready to answer her own questions about AMPA and NMDA receptor signalling within the midbrain dopaminergic reward circuitry. In Bellone's first author paper in 2005, she elucidate the mechanisms of long-term depression (LTD) in the glutamatergic synapses onto Ventral Tegmental Area (VTA) dopamine neurons. Upon activation of dopaminergic VTA synapses, Bellone found a metabotropic glutamate receptor mediated redistribution of AMPARs such that naive AMPARs were switched for GluR2 containing AMPARs leading to LTD. After this discovery, Bellone moved to an ex vivo model of cocaine addiction to understand the neuroplastic changes following cocaine abuse. Bellone found that cocaine caused significant increases in AMPA:NMDA ratio, a sign of neuroplastic adaptation, as well as a recruitment of AMPARs to the synapse that lack GluR2. However, Bellone was able to reverse this neuroplastic cocaine adaptation by stimulating mGluR1s.

Bellone completed her PhD and joined the lab of Roger Nicoll at the University of California, San Francisco. Shortly after joining the Nicoll Lab, Bellone published a first author paper in Neuron exploring the trafficking of NMDA receptors in hippocampal pyramidal cells in newborn mice. Bellone found that synaptic activity in neonatal hippocampal synapses can cause a change in the subunit composition of NMDARs. The dynamic nature of NMDAR subunit composition that Bellone described in neonatal synapses holds the potential to transform a synapse from one with a broad window for spike-timing plasticity to one with very reduced window.

In 2007, Bellone returned to Switzerland planning to pursue a career in academia. From 2007 until 2011, Bellone worked in Lüscher's lab as a Maître Assistante where she began to transition from the mentored-phase of her career to an independent career. During her further training in the Lüscher Lab, Bellone explored the effects of drugs of abuse on synaptic plasticity and physiology in the dopaminergic reward system. In 2010, Bellone followed up on her findings from graduate school regarding AMPAR redistribution following cocaine exposure. Bellone and her colleagues found that, not only do other drugs of abuse also elicit the same AMPAR redistribution, but also optogenetically stimulating the VTA dopamine neurons drives the same redistribution in the absence of drugs. The following year, Bellone highlighted the effects of cocaine exposure in utero on maturation of glutamatergic transmission in VTA dopamine neurons. In her paper published in Nature Neuroscience, Bellone showed that the glutamate receptor switch that occurs postnatally is delayed and mGluR1 function is impaired due to in utero cocaine exposure. Bellone was also able to show that positively modulating mGluR1 in vivo was sufficient to rescue the abnormal maturation due to in utero cocaine exposure.

== Career and research ==
In 2010, Bellone was awarded the Ambizione Grant from the Swiss National Science Foundation, a grant meant to support young researchers in starting their own independent projects at Swiss higher education institutions. For Bellone, this grant helped her to transition towards an independent career in neuroscience. Bellone had the idea to use her diverse skills from exploring the dopaminergic reward system towards exploring this system in the context of social reward. After spending much of her training looking at these circuits and their adaptions to drug rewards, she wanted to understand how the dopaminergic reward system encodes social rewards and drives social behaviors.

In 2014, Bellone applied to the University of Lausanne to start her own lab. Funded by the Swiss National Science Foundation, Bellone became an assistant professor in the Department of Fundamental Neuroscience at the University of Lausanne. Her lab at UNIL focused on understanding the development of the brain's reward circuitry, the mesocorticolimbic dopamine system, in mouse models. Using various techniques, both in vivo and ex vivo, Bellone explored how perturbations to this circuitry affect social motivation. Bellone's work aims to help understand the neural basis for complex social behaviors and how this circuitry might be implicated in psychiatric disorders characterized by aberrant social behaviors, such as Autism Spectrum Disorder.

Bellone applied for a position back at the University of Geneva. She was offered a position in 2016 as a Tenure-Track Assistant Professor to the Department of Basic Neuroscience at the University of Geneva. Bellone's lab at the University of Geneva continues to probe the dopaminergic neural circuits underlying social behavior in mice as a means to better our understanding of how dysfunction in these circuits may lead to psychiatric and neurodevelopmental diseases.

Bellone joined the 2016 NCCR-SYNAPSY project, an initiative started in 2010 to understand the synaptic bases of mental diseases by bringing together basic scientists with clinical scientists in an effort to create translational collaborations. Bellone collaborates closely with psychiatrists and clinical scientists to inspire translational research surrounding ASD.

Bellone is on the editorial board for the European Journal of Neuroscience, a Reviewer for Nat. Neurosci., J. Neuroscience, Neuroscience, Addiction Biology, Neural Plasticity, Frontiers, and PNAS, on the editorial board for Scientific Reports, responsible for the unit "Comment notre environnement influence-t-il la prise de drogue?" Brain week at the University of Geneva, a Member of the FENS-KAVLI network of excellence, on the Evaluation Committee (EvCo) for the SNSF Advanced Postdoc Mobility fellowships (domain Medicine), and a member of Society for Neuroscience, where she has spoken about career development for women in science through her talk "My Personal Journey From Synapse to Circuit to Behavior".

=== Social reward circuitry ===
Bellone sought to explore the connection between altered synaptic proteins and impaired social behaviors, merging her previous research experience with her new independent career interests. Reading genetic studies of Autism Spectrum Disorder (ASD), Bellone found that many genes associated with ASD are implicated in scaffolding of both ionotropic and metabotropic glutamate receptors. While they found impairments in social behavior upon modulation of glutamate receptor scaffolding genes, they suggest that a better understanding of the neural circuits driving social behavior is needed to understand the mechanisms that drive aberrant social behavior in disease.

Following this finding, Bellone and her colleagues worked to develop a disease model of ASD with which to probe social neural circuit function. Using shRNA, they modelled Shank3, a synapse scaffolding protein known to be implicated in ASD phenotypes, insufficiency in the VTA of mice. They found that mice exhibited impaired social preferences and abnormal excitatory transmission which reduced the output of VTA DA neurons. Bellone and her team however, were able to modulate DA neuron activity both pharmacologically, by allosterically activating mGlur1s, and optogenetically, to enhance social preference and partially restore social behavior.

In a recent collaboration with researchers at UNIL, Bellone explored neuroimmune and μ-opioid receptor-driven effects on sociability. They found that μ-opioid receptor activation causes microglial release of TNF-a, a pro-inflammatory cytokine. When TNF-a binds to its receptor on neurons, this leads to a subsequent reduction in AMPAR transmission in raphe-projecting lateral habenula neurons and results in social impairment in mice. The social impairment due to opiate receptor signalling through neuroimmune mechanisms is thought to underlie the negative symptoms associated with opiate abuse. These findings highlight the yet unidentified role of cytokine signalling in the habenula in both social behavior as well as the negative effects of drug addiction.

== Awards and honors ==
- 2004 Swiss Society for Neuroscience travel fellowship
- 2010 FENS/IBRO travel grant
- 2010 Ambizione grant from Swiss National Science Foundation
- 2012 Gertrude Von Meissner Foundation prize
- 2014 2014 Fondation du Prix Pfizer de la Recherche
- 2014 Professor Boursier Scholarship from Swiss National Science Foundation
- 2014-2018 FENS- KAVLI Scholar
- 2015 FENS-KAVLI network of Excellence

== Select publications ==
- Valentinova, K., Tchenio, A., Trusel, M. ... Bellone, C. Morphine withdrawal recruits lateral habenula cytokine signaling to reduce synaptic excitation and sociability. Nat Neurosci 22, 1053–1056 (2019). doi:10.1038/s41593-019-0421-4
- Sebastiano Bariselli, Stamatina Tzanoulinou, Christelle Glangetas, Clément Prévost-Solié, Luca Pucci, Joanna Viguié, Paola Bezzi, Eoin C O'Connor, François Georges, Christian Lüscher & Camilla Bellone. SHANK3 controls maturation of social reward circuits in the VTA. Nat. Neurosci. Nat Neurosci. 2016 Jul;19(7):926-34. I.F. 15.5
- Kehoe LA, Bellone C, De Roo M, Zandueta A, Dey PN, Pérez-Otaño I, Muller D. GluN3A promotes dendritic spine pruning and destabilization during postnatal development. J Neurosci. 2014 Jul 9;34(28):9213-21. I.F. 6.91
- Gabrielle Pouchelon, Frédéric Gambino, Camilla Bellone, Christian Lüscher, Anthony Holtmaat, Denis Jabaudon. Rewiring of distinct thalamocortical inputs instructs the modality-specific identity of postsynaptic L4 neurons. Nature. 2014 Jul 24;511(7510):471-4 I.F. 38.6
- De la Rossa A*, Bellone C*, Golding B, Vitali I, Moss J, Toni N, Lüscher C, Jabaudon D, In vivo reprogramming of circuit connectivity in postmitotic neocortical neurons, Nature Neuroscience, 2013, 6:193-200. *equal contribution.
- Bellone C, Mameli M, Lüscher C. In utero exposure to cocaine delays postnatal synaptic maturation of glutamatergic transmission in the VTA. Nature Neurosci., 2011, 14:1439-46.
- Bellone C., Lüscher C., Mameli M.. Mechanisms of synaptic depression triggered by metabotropic glutamate receptors. Cell. Mol. Life Science 2008 Sep;65(18):2913-23. Review.
- Lüscher C, Bellone C.. Cocaine-evoked synaptic plasticity: a key to addiction. Nat Neurosci. 2008 : 737–8. (IF 14.8)
- Bellone C. and Nicoll R.. Rapid bidirectional switching of synaptic NMDA receptors. Neuron 2007 :779-85 (IF 13.9)
- Bellone C. and Lüscher C.. Cocaine triggered AMPA receptor redistribution is reversed in vivo by mGluR-dependent long-term depression. Nat Neurosci. 2006 :636-41. (IF 14.8)
- Bellone C. and Lüscher C.. mGluRs induce a long-term depression in the ventral tegmental area that involves a switch of the subunit composition of AMPA receptors. Eur J Neurosci. 2005 :1280-8. (IF 3.7)
- Gardoni F., Bellone C., Viviani B., Marinovich M., Cattabeni F. and Di Luca M.. Lack of PSD-95 drives hippocampal but not cortical neuronal death through aCaMKII/AMPA potentiation . Eur J Neurosci. 2002 :7 (IF 3.7)
- Gardoni F., Kamal A., Bellone C., Biessels GJ., Ramakers GMJ., Cattabeni F., Gispen WH.and Di Luca M.. Effects of streptozotocin-Diabetes on the hippocampal NMDA receptor complex in rats. J. Neurochem, 2002 :438-47. (IF 4.3)
- Gardoni F., Bellone C., Cattabeni F. and Di Luca M.. PKC activation modulates aCaMKII binding to NR2A subunit of NMDA receptor complex. J.Biol.Chem 2001 : 7609-7613 (IF 5.8)
