= Carla J. Shatz =

American neuroscientist

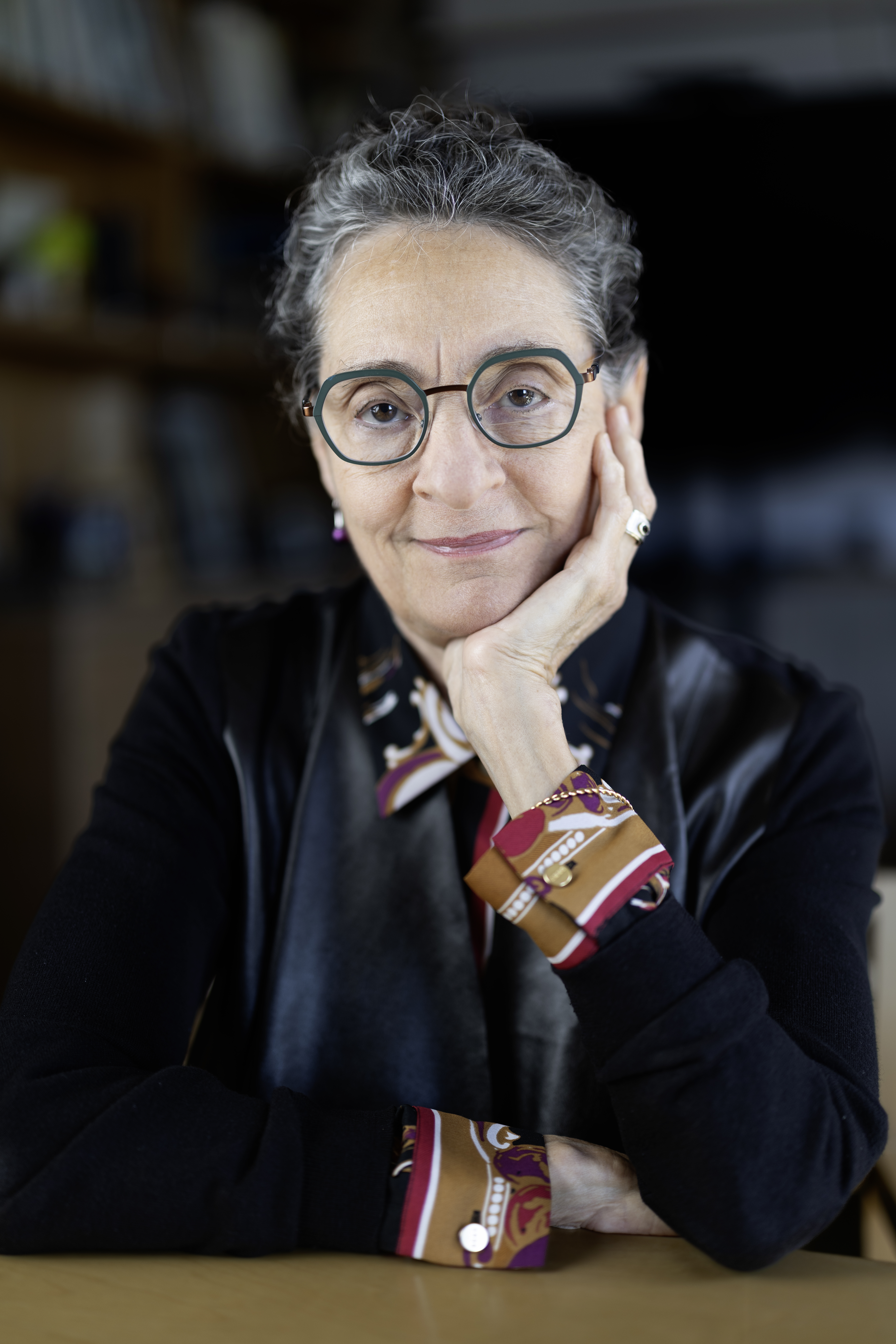
- Born: 1947 (age 78–79)
- Education: Radcliffe College (BA); University College London (MPhil); Harvard University (PhD)
- Known for: Role of neuronal activity in maturation of brain circuits
- Awards: Harvey Prize (2017); Kavli Prize (2016); Gruber Prize (2015); Gerard Prize (2011); Weizmann Women & Science Award (2000)
- Scientific career
- Workplaces: Howard Hughes Medical Institute; Stanford University; Harvard University; University of California, Berkeley
- Doctoral advisors: David Hubel, Torsten Wiesel
- Other academic advisors: Pasko Rakic
- Website: shatzlab.stanford.edu

Carla Jo Shatz (born 1947) is an American neurobiologist and an elected member of the American Academy of Arts and Sciences, the American Philosophical Society, the National Academy of Sciences, and the National Academy of Medicine.

She was the first woman to receive a PhD in neurobiology from Harvard. Shatz received a tenured position in the basic sciences at Stanford Medical School and later returned to Harvard to head the university's Department of Neurobiology. In both cases, Shatz was the first woman hired for the position.

== Career ==
Shatz graduated from Radcliffe College in 1969 with a BA in chemistry. She received an MPhil in Physiology from the University College London in 1971 on a Marshall Scholarship. In 1976, she received a PhD in neurobiology from Harvard Medical School, where she studied with the Nobel laureates David Hubel and Torsten Wiesel. From 1976 to 1978 she obtained postdoctoral training with Pasko Rakic in the department of neuroscience, Harvard Medical School.

In 1978, Shatz moved to Stanford University, where she began her studies of the development of the mammalian visual system in the department of Neurobiology. She became professor of neurobiology in 1989. In 1992, she moved her laboratory to the department of molecular and cell biology at the University of California, Berkeley, where she became a Howard Hughes Medical Institute investigator in 1994. During 1994–1995, she was president of the Society for Neuroscience and served on the Council of the National Academy of Sciences from 1998 to 2001.

In 2000, Shatz was named the Nathan Marsh Pusey Professor of Neurobiology at Harvard Medical School. She chaired the Department of Neurobiology from 2000 to 2007 and was the first woman to do so. Regarding her departure from Berkeley, she stated "I couldn't turn [the job] down because I felt I was on a mission to represent women at the highest levels." Shatz helped to develop the Harvard Center for Neurodegeneration and Repair (now named the Harvard NeuroDiscovery Center) and led the Harvard Center for Brain Imaging.

Shatz currently holds professorship appointments in both the Department of Biology (School of Humanities and Sciences) and in Neurobiology (School of Medicine) and is The Catherine Holman Johnson Director of Stanford Bio-X at Stanford University. She was the inaugural chair of The Sapp Family Provostial Professorship. She also served on the Life Sciences jury for the Infosys Prize in 2011.

== Research ==
Shatz is one of the pioneers who determined some of the basic principles of early brain development. She found that the spontaneous activity of neurons in utero is critical for the formation of precise and orderly neural connections in the central nervous system. She discovered that waves of spontaneous activity in the retina can alter gene expression and the strength of synaptic connections. In 2000, Shatz and colleagues identified MHC Class I molecules as important for neuronal plasticity, a surprising new role for molecules previously thought to have only immune system function.

Shatz is credited with coining a well-known mnemonic summarizing Hebbian theory: "Cells that fire together, wire together." In her September 1992 Scientific American article, she wrote, "Segregation to form the columns in the visual cortex [...] proceeds when the two nerves are stimulated asynchronously. In a sense, then, cells that fire together wire together. The timing of action-potential activity is critical in determining which synaptic connections are strengthened and retained and which are weakened and eliminated."

== Awards ==
Shatz has received the following awards and honors:

- 1985 Society for Neuroscience Young Investigator Award
- 1993 Silvo Conte Award, National Foundation for Brain Research
- 1995 Charles A. Dana Award for Pioneering Achievement in Health and Education
- 1997 Alcon Award for Outstanding Contributions to Vision Research
- 1999 Bernard Sachs Award from the Child Neurology Society
- 2000 Weizmann Women & Science Award
- 2006 Gill Prize in Neuroscience
- 2009 Mika Salpeter Lifetime Achievement Award
- 2011 Ralph W. Gerard Prize in Neuroscience
- 2013 Mortimer D. Sackler, M.D. Prize for Distinguished Achievement in Developmental Psychobiology
- 2015 Gruber Prize in Neuroscience
- 2016 Kavli Prize in Neuroscience
- 2016 Champalimaud Foundation Vision Award
- 2017 Harvey Prize in Science and Technology

She has been elected to numerous professional societies:

- American Academy of Arts and Sciences (1992)
- National Academy of Sciences (1995)
- American Philosophical Society (1997)
- National Academy of Medicine (1999)
- Foreign Member of the Royal Society of London (2011)
- European Academy of Sciences and Arts
- Honorary doctorate at the Norwegian University of Science and Technology (NTNU) (2023).

In 1997, Shatz was invited by President Bill Clinton and First Lady Hillary Clinton to speak at the White House Conference on Early Childhood Development and Learning.
