= Dirk Schübeler =

German molecular biology researcher (born 1969)

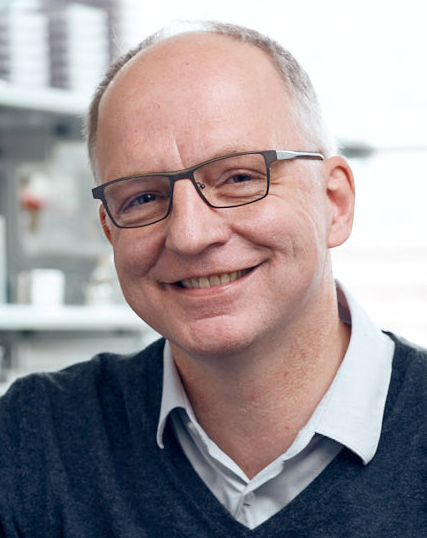
- Born: 8 May 1969 (age 56); Helmarshausen, Germany
- Scientific career
- Fields: Molecular biology, epigenetics
- Institutions: Helmholtz Center for Infectious Research; Fred Hutchinson Cancer Research Center; Friedrich Miescher Institute of Biomedical Research (FMI); University of Basel
- Website: www.fmi.ch/research-groups/groupleader.html?group=34

Dirk Schübeler is a German researcher, Director of the Friedrich Miescher Institute for Biomedical Research (FMI) and professor at the University of Basel. He is an expert in gene regulation.

== Education and career ==
Dirk Schübeler obtained his PhD from the Technical University in Braunschweig, Germany working in the Helmholtz Center for Infectious Research in the group of Jürgen Bode. He then did postdoctoral studies at the Fred Hutchinson Cancer Research Center in Seattle, USA, working with Mark Groudine. Schübeler joined the Friedrich Miescher Institute of Biomedical Research (FMI) in 2003 as a junior group leader, in 2008 he was appointed senior group leader, and in 2011 he became adjunct professor at the University of Basel. In April 2020 he was appointed Director of the FMI. Since January 2021, Dirk Schübeler has been Full Professor of Molecular Biology at the University of Basel.

Schübeler serves on the editorial board of several scientific journals including EMBO Journal and Molecular Systems Biology. He is a member of the Scientific Advisory Boards of the Research Institute of Molecular Pathology (IMP), Vienna, Austria, the Wellcome-MRC Cambridge Stem Cell Institute (CSCI), Cambridge, UK and the Excellence Centre of Integrative Biological Signaling Studies (CIBBS), Freiburg, Germany.

== Research ==
Schübeler's research focuses on understanding how chromatin states are generated and how they contribute to the regulation of transcription and replication. Together with his research group, Schübeler has pioneered approaches to measure DNA methylation, histone modifications and DNA replication at the level of the genome, and combining these with functional assays such as genome editing. The Schübeler group has identified recruitment mechanism for readers and writers of DNA methylation towards a better understanding of the information flow that generates and reads a chromatinized genome. More recently, the group has aimed to define how transcription factors can bind and modify chromatin.

== Awards and honors ==
1995-1998: Graduate Fellowship, Foundation of the German Chemical Industry
1997: Thesis award, GBF Förderpreis
1998-2000: Postdoctoral Fellowship, Deutsche Forschungsgemeinschaft
2000-2002: Postdoctoral Fellowship, Rett Syndrome Research Foundation
2006: EMBO Young Investigator Award
2006: Election to the Epigenome Network of Excellence
2007: Friedrich Miescher Prize, Swiss Society for Biochemistry
2008: ERC Starting Grant
2009: Election to EMBO
2011: Novartis VIVA Leading Scientist Award
2012: Election to Academia Europaea
2014: ESCI Award for Excellence in Basic/Translational Research
2015: ERC Advanced Grant
2020: ERC Advanced Grant
