= Venkatesh N. Murthy =

Indian-American neuroscientist

Venkatesh N. Murthy is an Indian-American neuroscientist and professor at Harvard University, widely recognized for his research on the neural and algorithmic mechanisms of olfaction. He is the Raymond Leo Erikson Life Sciences Professor of Molecular and Cellular Biology and the Paul J. Finnegan Family Director of the Center for Brain Science at Harvard. Murthy also serves as Co-Director of the Harvard Brain Science Initiative.

== Early life and education ==
Murthy was born in Neyveli, a small industrial town in southern India from a Tamil family. He earned a Bachelor of Technology degree in Mechanical Engineering from the Indian Institute of Technology Madras in 1986. He then pursued graduate studies in the United States, obtaining an M.S. in Bioengineering (1988) and a Ph.D. in Physiology and Biophysics (1994) from the University of Washington, Seattle.

== Academic career ==
Following his doctoral training, Murthy conducted postdoctoral research at the Salk Institute for Biological Studies in La Jolla, California, working with Terry Sejnowski and Charles Stevens. He joined the faculty at Harvard University in 1999 as an Assistant Professor in the Department of Molecular and Cellular Biology. He was subsequently promoted to Morris Kahn Associate Professor (2003–2006), full Professor (2007–2018), and became the Raymond Leo Erikson Life Sciences Professor in 2019.

== Research ==
Murthy's research focuses on understanding how the mammalian brain processes olfactory information and transforms it into behavior. His lab studies the neural circuits, computations, and plasticity involved in odor perception and odor-guided decision-making, primarily in mice. His lab utilizes techniques such as in vivo two-photon calcium imaging, electrophysiology, optogenetics, and behavioral assays. Areas of interest include:

- Olfactory cortex plasticity: His lab has shown that odor mixture representations in the piriform cortex evolve with sensory experience, enhancing discrimination and perceptual flexibility.
- Olfactory tubercle and reward: Murthy's 2022 study in eLife demonstrated that D1 and D2 medium spiny neurons in the olfactory tubercle differentially encode cue-outcome associations, highlighting the role of olfaction in reward-guided behavior.
- Top-down modulation: In a 2024 Nature Communications paper, Murthy's team explored how feedforward and feedback streams converge on the olfactory bulb, influencing sensory processing and perceptual stability.
- Compressed sensing and modeling: In collaboration with theorists, Murthy co-developed models of sparse coding in olfaction, suggesting that the brain may use compressed sensing strategies to decode odor mixtures.

His group has also contributed to biologically inspired robotics and collective behavior, including studies of ant excavation dynamics in collaboration with L. Mahadevan. Murthy was also a co-author of DeepLabCut, a widely adopted open-source tool for markerless pose estimation in animals using deep learning.

== Honors and awards ==
- Pew Scholar in Biomedical Sciences (2000–2004)

== Selected publications ==
- Berners-Lee, A., Shtrahman, E., Grimaud, J., & Murthy, V.N. (2023). "Experience-dependent evolution of odor mixture representations in piriform cortex." PLoS Biology, 21(4): e3002086.
- Ganga Prasath, S., Mandal, S., Giardina, F., Kennedy, J., Murthy, V.N., & Mahadevan, L. (2022). "Dynamics of cooperative excavation in ant and robot collectives." eLife, 11:e79638.
- Martiros, N., Kim, S.E., Kapoor, V., & Murthy, V.N. (2022). "Distinct representation of cue-outcome association by D1 and D2 neurons in the olfactory tubercle." eLife, 11:e75463.
- Millman, D.J., & Murthy, V.N. (2020). "Rapid learning of odor-value association in the olfactory striatum." Journal of Neuroscience.
- Reddy, G., Zak, J.D., Vergassola, M., & Murthy, V.N. (2018). "Antagonism in olfactory receptor neurons and its implications for perception of odor mixtures." eLife, 7:e34958.
- Mathis, A., Mamidanna, P., Cury, K.M., Abe, T., Murthy, V.N., et al. (2018). "DeepLabCut: markerless pose estimation of user-defined body parts with deep learning." Nature Neuroscience, 21(9):1281–1289.
