= Alexander Mathis =

Austrian computational neuroscientist

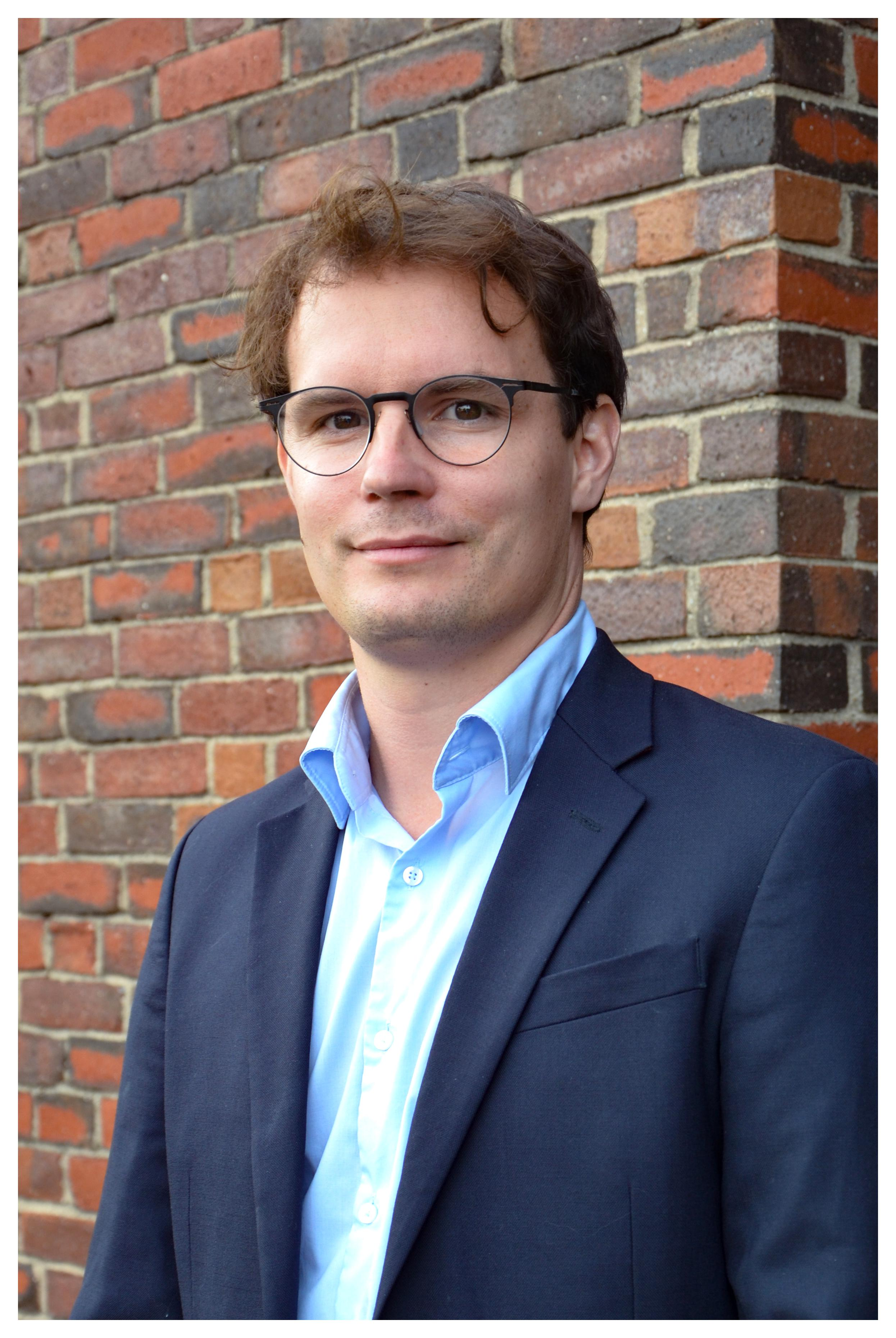
- Mathis at Harvard University in 2020
- Born: Bregenz, Austria
- Education: LMU Munich (Diploma, PhD); University of Tübingen; Harvard University
- Known for: DeepLabCut
- Awards: Robert Bing Prize; Eric Kandel Young Neuroscientists Prize; Frontiers of Science Award; Marie-Curie fellowship
- Scientific career
- Fields: Neuroscience
- Workplaces: École polytechnique fédérale de Lausanne (EPFL)
- Website: https://www.mathislab.org/

Alexander Mathis is an Austrian mathematician, computational neuroscientist and software developer. He is currently an assistant professor at the École polytechnique fédérale de Lausanne (EPFL) in Switzerland. He is working at the intersection of computational neuroscience, and machine learning, focusing on trying to understand the statistics of behavior and how the brain creates behavior.

== Education ==
Mathis studied mathematics, logic and theory of science at LMU Munich, Germany. His interest in computing and cryptography led him to pursue a PhD in computational neuroscience at the Graduate School for Systemic Neuroscience under the supervision of Prof. Andreas Herz at the department of neurobiology at LMU Munich. During his PhD work, he studied optimal coding approaches to reveal the properties of grid cells and how distributed population activity readout can be implemented in plausible bio-physical models. The predictions of this theory were confirmed in rats by the Moser laboratory and artificial systems optimized for navigation by DeepMind.

He spent an exchange year at the Autonomous University of Barcelona in Spain.

== Career and research ==
After completing his PhD, Mathis went in 2013 as a postdoctoral fellow to work under the mentorship of Prof. Venkatesh N. Murthy at the Department of Molecular and Cellular Biology at Harvard University. In addition, in 2015, he joined the research group of Prof. Matthias Bethge at the Bernstein Center for Computational Neuroscience in Tübingen and the University of Tübingen in Germany. His postdoctoral research positions were funded by a DFG postdoctoral fellowship and a Marie-Curie fellowship.

Mathis conducted research in odor-guided navigation, social behaviors, motor learning, and the cocktail party problem. He employed deep learning methods and experimentally testable computational models to study animal behavior and neural data. He has developed tools such as DeepLabCut and DeepDraw to accurately measure animal and human behavior. He is one of the initiators and developers of the open-source research tool DeepLabCut that estimates animal postures via computer vision and machine learning. Mathis has also created models and theories on adaptive behavior, in particular on motor control and sensorimotor transformations. Several publications appeared during this research period, including the highly cited paper "DeepLabCut: markerless pose estimation of user-defined body parts with deep learning" by Mathis et al. published in 2018 in Nature Neuroscience.

In August 2020, he moved as an assistant professor to the École polytechnique fédérale de Lausanne (EPFL) in Switzerland where he started his own research laboratory "the Mathis Group", dedicated to research at the intersection of computational neuroscience and machine learning. The Mathis Group is committed to enhancing machine learning tools for animal behavior analysis and to developing of neural network models of sensorimotor representation. The group has made significant contributions to understanding proprioception, highlighting that task-driven models can reproduce neural population dynamics along the proprioceptive pathway and that task-driven models are also subject to proprioceptive illusions. This research has garnered public attention, including coverage on Radio France discussing how artificial neurons help understand body perception. His research was also featured in The Atlantic, Nature, and Quanta Magazine.

== Awards and grants ==
Chan Zuckerberg Initiative (CZI) awarded funding for Mathis' open source project DeepLabCut. Mathis further was awarded with a postdoctoral fellowship by the Deutsche Forschungsgemeinschaft and a Marie Skłodowska-Curie Actions fellowship by the European Union

== Publications ==
Alexander Mathis publications indexed by Google Scholar
