= Susan M. Gasser =

Molecular biologist

- Born: 29 March 1955 (age 71)
- Education: St. John's College (1974–1976); University of Chicago (BA); University of Basel (PhD)
- Known for: Chromatin organization, gene silencing and DNA repair
- Awards: National Latsis Prize (1991); EMBO Member (1993); Member of the Academia Europaea (1998); Otto Naegeli Prize (2006); Fellow of the AAAS (2008); FEBS/EMBO Women in Science Award (2012); Weizmann Women & Science Award (2013); Member of the National Academy of Sciences (2022); Member of the American Academy of Arts and Sciences (2026)
- Scientific career
- Fields: Molecular biology Epigenetics
- Workplaces: Swiss Institute for Experimental Cancer Research; University of Geneva; Friedrich Miescher Institute for Biomedical Research; University of Basel; University of Lausanne
- Doctoral advisor: Gottfried Schatz

Susan Margaret Gasser (born 29 March 1955) is a Swiss molecular biologist whose research concerns chromatin organization, epigenetic regulation and genome stability, with a focus on biomedical impact. She is Director of the ISREC Foundation and a guest professor at the University of Lausanne. Her work examines how the arrangement and movement of chromosomes within the cell nucleus influence gene expression and DNA repair.

Gasser directed the Friedrich Miescher Institute for Biomedical Research in Basel from 2004 to 2019 and was professor of molecular biology at the University of Basel from 2005 to 2021. She has been elected to scientific academies including the French Academy of Sciences, German National Academy of Sciences Leopoldina, and the United States National Academy of Sciences.

== Early life and education ==
Gasser attended St. John's College in Annapolis, Maryland, from 1974 to 1976, followed by the University of Freiburg from 1976 to 1977. She subsequently studied at the University of Chicago, receiving a Bachelor of Arts with honors in 1979 and completing an honors thesis in biophysics.

She completed a PhD in biochemistry at the University of Basel in 1982 under the supervision of Gottfried Schatz. Her doctoral research involved developing an in vitro assay system for investigating the import of mitochondrial proteins, demonstrating its energy dependence and identifying compartment-specific protein-processing pathways.

After a postdoctoral appointment at the University of Basel in 1982, Gasser worked as a postdoctoral assistant with Ulrich K. Laemmli in the Department of Molecular Biology at the University of Geneva from 1983 to 1986. Her research there concerned chromosome structure and the organization of chromatin loops, including the role of topoisomerase II in metaphase chromosome structure and adenine- and thymine-rich sequences in long-range chromatin folding.

== Career ==
In 1986, she established a research group at the Swiss Institute for Experimental Cancer Research (ISREC) in Epalinges, near Lausanne. She remained at ISREC until 2001, studying chromatin organization through yeast genetics, microscopy and biochemical methods. She continued these studies as professor of molecular biology at the University of Geneva from 2001 to 2004.

Gasser became Director of the Friedrich Miescher Institute for Biomedical Research in 2004, serving until 2019. She continued to lead a research group at the institute until 2021 and held a parallel professorship in molecular biology at the University of Basel from 2005 to 2021.

In 2021, she became Director of the ISREC Foundation and a guest professor at the University of Lausanne. Her work at the foundation includes support for the Agora Cancer Research Center, which brings together cancer researchers and clinicians from universities and hospitals in Lausanne and Geneva.

She has also held visiting appointments at Osaka University and the Tokyo Institute of Technology. In 2026, she took up a 5-year specially appointed visiting professorship at Tohoku University in Sendai.

== Research ==
Gasser's research investigates the relationship between the organization of chromatin—the DNA and associated proteins that make up chromosomes—and the regulation and maintenance of the genome. Her laboratory has used the budding yeast Saccharomyces cerevisiae and the nematode Caenorhabditis elegans as model organisms, combining genetics, biochemistry, genome-wide analyses and fluorescence microscopy of living cells.

During her postdoctoral work, Gasser studied the role of topoisomerase II in the structure of mitotic chromosomes and characterized DNA regions associated with chromatin loops. At ISREC, she investigated the organization of DNA replication origins and developed assays for studying replication in isolated yeast nuclei and nuclear extracts.

Her laboratory showed that telomeres cluster near the nuclear envelope and examined how this organization contributes to gene silencing. These studies identified roles for the Sir3 and Sir4 proteins in telomere positioning and integrity. In collaboration with Michael Grunstein, she investigated interactions between these proteins and the tails of histones H3 and H4, contributing to a molecular model of silent chromatin formation in yeast. Her group subsequently examined how the concentration of silencing proteins within nuclear compartments affects gene repression. It also studied the relationship between association with nuclear pores and the activation of inducible genes, showing that positioning at the nuclear periphery can have different effects on gene expression and telomere length maintenance.

Gasser's laboratory developed time-lapse fluorescence imaging methods to measure the movement of individual chromosomal regions in living yeast cells. These studies showed that chromatin moves continuously within the nucleus and that its mobility varies with the cell cycle and its attachment to nuclear structures. Chromatin organization and movement change upon DNA damage in a checkpoint kinase-dependent manner and depend on the recruitment of the INO80 chromatin-remodeling complex. They also were first to show the relocation of persistent DNA double-strand breaks to nuclear pores, and that both pores and remodelers contribute to the recovery of collapsed replication forks.

Later studies showed that DNA damage can trigger histone degradation, altering chromatin structure and increasing access for proteins involved in homologous recombination. These investigations linked changes in chromatin packaging and mobility to the mechanisms through which cells repair damaged DNA.

In C. elegans, Gasser's laboratory investigated how heterochromatin, a form of chromatin associated with gene repression, is positioned within the nucleus during development. Her group showed that methylation of lysine 9 on histone H3, known as H3K9 methylation, contributes to the localization of heterochromatin at the nuclear periphery. The laboratory identified CEC-4, a chromodomain protein that selectively binds methylated H3K9, as a heterochromatin anchor at the nuclear periphery, connecting chromatin anchoring with the maintenance of cell identity during cellular differentiation. Subsequent studies examined how modifications associated with active chromatin help separate transcribed regions of the genome from heterochromatin in differentiated cells.

Her group illustrated how H3K9 methylation suppresses repetitive DNA transcription and protects against genome instability associated with RNA–DNA hybrids. Using a C. elegans model of Emery–Dreifuss muscular dystrophy, the laboratory examined how altered chromatin anchoring by nuclear lamins affects gene positioning and muscle function.

== Professional service ==
Gasser served on the research council of the Swiss National Science Foundation from 1993 to 2002 and chaired the council of the European Molecular Biology Organization (EMBO) from 2002 to 2004. She was a member of the President's Science and Technology Advisory Council of the European Commission from 2013 to 2015, and of the Swiss Science Council from 2016 to 2023. She was a member of the ETH Board from 2018 to 2026. From 2019 to 2026, she was Chairwoman of the Strategic Advisory Committee of the Helmholtz Health Institutes in Germany. She has also represented Switzerland on the councils of the European Molecular Biology Conference and the European Molecular Biology Laboratory.

Her scientific advisory work has included roles with the Francis Crick Institute, the Biozentrum of the University of Basel, Vlaams Instituut voor Biotechnologie in Belgium and the International Institute of Molecular and Cell Biology in Warsaw, among others. Outside academia, she served on the Board of Directors of UCB from 2021 to 2025, on the Board of Directors of the Genomics Institute of the Novartis Research Foundation from 2014 to 2018, and as a member of the Nestlé Nutrition Council from 2007 to 2017.

Gasser chaired the Swiss National Science Foundation's gender equality commission and helped establish its PRIMA programme to support women in academic research. She has participated in mentoring programmes for women scientists in Switzerland and Japan and was a founding member of Women in Science Japan in 2019.

== Honors and awards ==
- 1991 – National Latsis Prize, Swiss National Science Foundation
- 1993 – EMBO Member
- 1994 – Friedrich Miescher Prize, Swiss Biochemical Society
- 1998 – Elected Member of the Academia Europaea
- 1999 – Medal of Honor, Third Faculty of Medicine, Charles University, Prague
- 2005 – Elected foreign member of the French Academy of Sciences
- 2006 – Elected to the Swiss Academy of Medical Sciences
- 2006 – Otto Naegeli Prize
- 2006 – Gregor Mendel Medal, Czech Academy of Sciences
- 2007 – Elected to the German National Academy of Sciences Leopoldina
- 2008 – Elected Fellow of the American Association for the Advancement of Science
- 2009 – Nucleic Acids Award, Royal Society of Chemistry
- 2011 – Inserm International Prize
- 2012 – FEBS/EMBO Women in Science Award
- 2013 – Member of the European Commission President's Science and Technology Advisory Council
- 2013 – Weizmann Women & Science Award, Weizmann Institute of Science
- 2014 – Honorary doctorate from the University of Lausanne
- 2016 – Honorary doctorate from Charles University, Prague
- 2016 – Lee Hartwell Lecture, Genetics Society of America
- 2021 – Honorary doctorate from the University of Fribourg
- 2022 – Honorary doctorate from the University of Geneva
- 2022 – Elected international Member of the National Academy of Sciences
- 2023 – Lelio Orci Award, Life Sciences Switzerland
- 2026 – Elected member of the American Academy of Arts and Sciences

== Selected publications ==
- Palladino, F.; Laroche, T.; Gilson, E.; Axelrod, A.; Pillus, L.; Gasser, S. M. (1993). "SIR3 and SIR4 proteins are required for the positioning and integrity of yeast telomeres". Cell. 75: 543–555. doi:10.1016/0092-8674(93)90388-7
- Hecht, A.; Laroche, T.; Strahl-Bolsinger, S.; Gasser, S. M.; Grunstein, M. (1995). "Histone H3 and H4 N-termini interact with SIR3 and SIR4 proteins: a molecular model for the formation of heterochromatin in yeast". Cell. 80: 583–592. doi:10.1016/0092-8674(95)90512-X
- Martin, S. G.; Laroche, T.; Suka, N.; Grunstein, M.; Gasser, S. M. (1999). "Relocalization of telomeric Ku and SIR proteins in response to DNA strand breaks in yeast". Cell. 97: 621–633. doi:10.1016/S0092-8674(00)80773-4
- Heun, P.; Laroche, T.; Shimada, K.; Furrer, P.; Gasser, S. M. (2001). "Chromosomal dynamics in the yeast interphase nucleus". Science. 293: 2181–2186. doi:10.1126/science.1065366
- van Attikum, H.; Fritsch, O.; Hohn, B.; Gasser, S. M. (2004). "INO80 recruitment by H2A phosphorylation links ATP-dependent chromatin remodeling with DNA double-strand break repair". Cell. 119: 777–788. doi:10.1016/j.cell.2004.11.033
- Taddei, A.; Van Houwe, G.; Hediger, F.; Kalck, V.; Cubizolles, F.; Schober, H.; Gasser, S. M. (2006). "Nuclear pore association confers optimal expression levels for an inducible yeast gene". Nature. 441: 774–778. doi:10.1038/nature04845
- Dion, V.; Kalck, V.; Horigome, C.; Towbin, B. D.; Gasser, S. M. (2012). "Increased dynamics of double-strand breaks requires Mec1, Rad9 and the homologous recombination machinery". Nature Cell Biology. 14: 502–509. doi:10.1038/ncb2465
- Towbin, B. D.; González-Aguilera, C.; Sack, R.; Gaidatzis, D.; Kalck, V.; Meister, P.; Askjaer, P.; Gasser, S. M. (2012). "Step-wise methylation of histone H3K9 positions heterochromatin at the nuclear periphery". Cell. 150: 934–947. doi:10.1016/j.cell.2012.06.051
- Gonzalez-Sandoval, A.; Towbin, B. D.; Kalck, V.; Cabianca, D. S.; Gaidatzis, D.; Hauer, M. H.; Geng, L.; Wang, L.; Yang, T.; Wang, X.; Zhao, K.; Gasser, S. M. (2015). "Perinuclear anchoring of H3K9-methylated chromatin stabilizes induced cell fate in C. elegans embryos". Cell. 163: 1333–1347. doi:10.1016/j.cell.2015.10.066
- Zeller, P.; Padeken, J.; van Schendel, R.; Kalck, V.; Tijsterman, M.; Gasser, S. M. (2016). "Histone H3K9 methylation is dispensable for C. elegans development but suppresses RNA–DNA hybrid-associated repeat instability". Nature Genetics. 48: 1385–1395. doi:10.1038/ng.3672
- Hauer, M. H.; Seeber, A.; Singh, V.; Thierry, R.; Sack, R.; Amitai, A.; Kryzhanovska, M.; Eglinger, J.; Holcman, D.; Owen-Hughes, T.; Gasser, S. M. (2017). "Histone degradation in response to DNA damage enhances chromatin dynamics and recombination rates". Nature Structural & Molecular Biology. 24: 99–107. doi:10.1038/nsmb.3347
- Cabianca, D.; Muñoz-Jiménez, C.; Kalck, V.; Gaidatzis, D.; Padeken, J.; Askjaer, P.; Gasser, S. M. (2019). "Active chromatin marks drive spatial sequestration of heterochromatin in differentiated cells". Nature. 569: 734–739. doi:10.1038/s41586-019-1243-y
