= Otto-Naegeli-Preis =

Swiss award for medical research

- Country: Switzerland
- Presented by: Bonizzi-Theler-Foundation
- Rewards: Prize money of 200,000 CHF, approx. US$200,000 (2018)
- First award: 1960; 66 years ago
- Website: www.otto-naegeli-preis.ch

The Otto-Naegeli-Preis is a Swiss award for medical research that is awarded every two years. It is one of the most prestigious Swiss medical awards and is given with an award sum of 200,000 Swiss Francs. It was established in 1960 and is named after Otto Naegeli, a former professor of internal medicine at the University of Zurich.

== Awardees ==
The Awardees of the prize are the following:

Year	Awardee	Field
2024	Mirjam Christ-Crain	Endocrinology, Diabetes and Metabolism
2022	Nicolas Thomä	Structural Biology
2020	Christian Lüscher	Neurobiology & Neurology
2018	Nenad Ban	Structural Molecular Biology
2016	Markus G. Manz	Hematology and Oncology
2016	Adrian F. Ochsenbein	Clinical and Experimental Oncology
2014	Silvia Arber	Neurobiology
2012	Lars E. French	Dermatology
2012	Markus H. Heim	Hepatology/Innate Immunity
2010	Ruedi Aebersold	Systems biology/proteomics
2010	Amos Bairoch	Bioinformatics/proteomics
2008	Pierre-Alain Clavien	Abdominal surgery/transplantation
2006	Susan Gasser	Molecular biology/epigenetics
2004	Ernst Hafen	Developmental biology/systems biology
2002	Walter Wahli	Cell biology/energy homeostases
2000	Susanne Suter	Paediatrics/Cystic fibrosis
1998	Hans Hengartner	Experimental immunology/virology
1996	Ueli Schibler	Molecular biology/circadian rhythms
1994	Heini Murer	Physiology/membrane transport
1992	Heidi Diggelmann	Microbiology/retroviruses
1990	Pierre Vassalli	Pathology/haematology
1988	Rolf Zinkernagel	Experimental immunology/virology
1986	Lelio Orci	Endocrinology/cell biology
1984	Werner Straub	Internal medicine/metabolism
1983	Jules Angst	Psychiatry/depression
1982	Walter J. Gehring	Developmental biology/Drosophila
1981	Günter Baumgartner	Neurology/neurophysiology
1979	Max L. Birnstiel	Molecular biology
1978	E. Rudolf Froesch	Endocrinology/insulin
1977	Hugo Studer	Internal medicine/thyroid function
1975	Max M. Burger	Oncology
1974	Ernst Sorkin	Biochemistry/oncology
1973	Hans R. Mühlemann	Periodontics
1972	Hugo Aebi	Biochemistry/clinical chemistry
1972	Charles Rouiller	Morphology/histology
1970	Robert Keller	Immunology
1969	Konrad Akert	Neurobiology
1967	Albert Renold	Biochemistry/endocrinology
1966	Andrea Prader	Paediatrics/metabolism
1965	Micheline Bettex-Galland	Biochemistry/thrombocytes
1965	Ernst Luescher	Biochemistry/thrombocytes
1964	Robert Schwyzer	Biochemistry/molecular biology
1962	Gian Töndury	Anatomy/locomotor system
1961	Kitty Ponse	Zoology/endocrinology
1960	Franz Leuthardt	Biochemistry/metabolism
