= Weizmann Women & Science Award =

The Weizmann Women & Science Award is a biennial award established in 1994 to honor an outstanding woman scientist in the United States who has made significant contributions to the scientific community. The objective of the award, which includes a $25,000 research grant to the recipient, is to promote women in science, and to provide a strong role model to motivate and encourage the next generation of young women scientists.

The award was originally given by the American Committee for the Weizmann Institute of Science (ACWIS) and now it is awarded by the Weizmann Institute and the award ceremony takes place at the Weizmann Institute, located in the city of Rehovoth, Israel.

The Weizmann Institute is a center of basic interdisciplinary scientific research and graduate study, addressing crucial problems in technology, medicine and health, energy, agriculture and the environment.

== Honorees ==
- 1994 Dr. Joan A. Steitz, a Henry Ford II Professor of Biophysics and Biochemistry at Yale University and an Investigator of the Howard Hughes Medical Institute.
- 1996 Dr. Vera Rubin, Observational Astronomer, Department of Terrestrial Magnetism, Carnegie Institution
- 1998 Dr. Jacqueline Barton, Arthur and Marian Hanisch Professor of Chemistry at the California Institute of Technology.
- 2000 Dr. Carla J. Shatz, Nathan Marsh Pusey Professor and Chair, Department of Neurobiology, Harvard Medical School
- 2000 Dr. Mildred Dresselhaus, Institute Professor of Electrical Engineering and Physics, Massachusetts Institute of Technology. Received the Millennial Lifetime Achievement Award
- 2002 Dr. Susan Solomon, Senior Scientist, Aeronomy Laboratory, National Oceanic and Atmospheric Administration
- 2004 Dr. May Berenbaum, Swanlund Professor; Head, Department of Entomology, University of Illinois at Urbana-Champaign
- 2006 Dr. Mary-Claire King, American Cancer Society Research Professor of Genome Sciences and Medicine, University of Washington, Seattle
- 2008 Dr. Elizabeth Blackburn, researcher at the University of California, San Francisco
- 2011 Dr. Catherine Bréchignac, President of the International Council for Science and former president of the CNRS ("National Centre for Scientific Research")
- 2013 Prof. Susan Gasser, Friedrich Miescher Institute for Biomedical Research, Switzerland
- 2015 Prof. Barbara Liskov computer scientist and Institute professor at the Massachusetts Institute of Technology (MIT)
- 2017 Prof. Ursula Keller and Prof. Naomi Halas
- 2019 Mina Bissell and Nieng Yan

== See also ==
- See also List of prizes, medals, and awards for women in science
