= Christian Lüscher (neurobiologist) =

Swiss neurobiologist (born 1963)

- Born: April 13, 1963 (age 63)
- Scientific career
- Fields: Neuroscience
- Workplaces: University of Geneva & Geneva University Hospital

Christian Lüscher (born April 13, 1963) is a Swiss neurobiologist and full professor at the Department of Basic Neurosciences of the University of Geneva. He is also an attending in neurology at the Geneva University Hospital. Lüscher is known for his contributions in the field addiction, particularly for establishing links of causality between the drug-evoked synaptic plasticity and adaptive behavior in mice.

== Early life ==
Lüscher was born in Bern, Switzerland and grew up there in the lake of Constance area.

== Education ==
Lüscher studied medicine in Lausanne and Berne and obtained his federal diploma in 1990. In his MD degree, he studied the effects of axon morphology on action potential propagation. After clinical residencies at the Inselspital in Bern and the University Hospital in Geneva, he left for a postdoctoral fellowship at UCSF (Advisor Roger Nicoll). He returned to University of Geneva with a career development award of the Swiss National Science Foundation, where he first became associated (2003) and then full professor (2009)

== Research ==
Lüscher studies how addictive drugs alter synaptic transmission in the reward system of the mouse brain. He has proposed a mechanistic classification of addictive drugs and developed optogenetic stimulation protocols that when applied in a mouse model of addiction can erase adaptive behavior. In his most recent work he explores the molecular basis of individual vulnerability to addiction and launched several translational projects. He has initiated the OptoDBS conference series, seeking to emulate optogenetic innervations with deep brain stimulation.

Lüscher also studies the circuits underlying hedonic feeding. He has observed that suppression of activity of D1 receptor expression medium spiny neurons that project to the lateral hypothalamus (LH) authorizes food intake. Moreover synaptic depression of GABA transmission in the LH leads to overeating. the same circuits are also controlling the social transmission of a food safety signal.

Among others, Lüscher has mentored the following scientists, who are now independent investigators: Camilla Bellone (Associate Professor University of Geneva), Meaghan Creed (Assistant Professor, Washington University in St. Louis), Manuel Mameli (Associate Professor, University of Lausanne), Tifei Yuan (Associate Professor, Shanghai Jiao Tong University, CN)

== Awards and honors ==
- 2023 Peter Seeburg Integrative Neuroscience Prize
- 2022 Chica and Heinz Schaller Foundation Award in Translational Neuroscience Chica and Heinz Schaller Foundation
- 2020 ERC European Research Council Advanced Grant
- 2020 Otto-Naegeli-Preis
- 2019 Schaefer Research Scholar, Columbia University
- 2017 Théodore Ott Prize of Swiss Academy of Medical Sciences
- 2016 Betty and David Koetser Award for Brain Research
- 2015- Member American College of Neuropsychopharmacology
- 2015- Member Senate of Swiss Academy of Medical Sciences
- 2013 ERC European Research Council Advanced Grant
- 2010 Cloëtta Prize

== Key papers ==
- Chaudun, Fabrice; Python, Laurena; Liu, Yiu; Hiver, Agnès; Cand, Jennifer; Kieffer, Brigitte L.; Valjent, Emmanuel; Lüscher, Christian (2024). "Distinct µ-opioid ensembles trigger positive and negative fentanyl reinforcement". Nature. 630 (8015): 141–148. doi:10.1038/s41586-024-07440-x. PMC 11153127. PMID 38778097.
- Lüscher, Christian; Janak, Patricia H (2021). "Consolidating the Circuit Model for Addiction". Annual Review of Neuroscience. 44: 173–195. doi:10.1146/annurev-neuro-092920-123905. PMID 33667115. S2CID 232130208.
- Pascoli, Vincent; Hiver, Agnès; van Zessen, Ruud; Loureiro, Michaël; Achargui, Ridouane; Floakowski, Jérôme; Lüscher, Christian (2018). "Stochastic synaptic plasticity underlying compulsion in a model of addiction". Nature. 564 (7736): 366–371. Bibcode:2018Natur.564..366P. doi:10.1038/s41586-018-0789-4. PMID 30568192. S2CID 56481129.
- Creed, Meaghan; Pascoli, Vincent Jean; Lüscher, Christian (6 February 2015). "Refining deep brain stimulation to emulate optogenetic treatment of synaptic pathology". Science. 347 (6222): 659–664. Bibcode:2015Sci...347..659C. doi:10.1126/science.1260776. PMID 25657248. S2CID 6771097.
- Pascoli, Vincent; Terrier, Jean; Espallergues, Julie; Valjent, Emmanuel; O’Connor, Eoin Cornelius; Lüscher, Christian (May 2014). "Contrasting forms of cocaine-evoked plasticity control components of relapse". Nature. 509 (7501): 459–464. Bibcode:2014Natur.509..459P. doi:10.1038/nature13257. PMID 24848058. S2CID 513756.
- Bocklisch, Christina; Pascoli, Vincent; Wong, Jovi C. Y.; House, David R. C.; Yvon, Cédric; de Roo, Mathias; Tan, Kelly R.; Lüscher, Christian (27 September 2013). "Cocaine Disinhibits Dopamine Neurons by Potentiation of GABA Transmission in the Ventral Tegmental Area". Science. 341 (6153): 1521–1525. Bibcode:2013Sci...341.1521B. doi:10.1126/science.1237059. PMID 24072923. S2CID 13365786.
- Pascoli, Vincent; Turiault, Marc; Lüscher, Christian (January 2012). "Reversal of cocaine-evoked synaptic potentiation resets drug-induced adaptive behaviour". Nature. 481 (7379): 71–75. Bibcode:2012Natur.481...71P. doi:10.1038/nature10709. PMID 22158102. S2CID 4424820.
- Tan, Kelly R.; Brown, Matthew; Labouèbe, Gwenaël; Yvon, Cédric; Creton, Cyril; Fritschy, Jean-Marc; Rudolph, Uwe; Lüscher, Christian (February 2010). "Neural bases for addictive properties of benzodiazepines". Nature. 463 (7282): 769–774. Bibcode:2010Natur.463..769T. doi:10.1038/nature08758. PMC 2871668. PMID 20148031.
