= Eilika Weber-Ban =

German biochemist (born 1968)

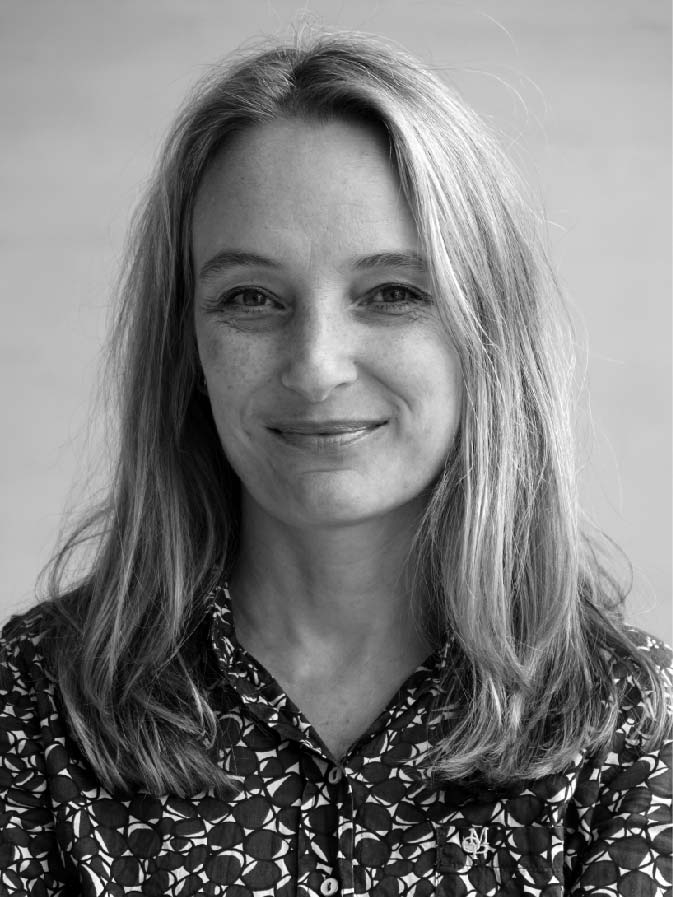
- Born: Eilika Ulrike Weber; 15 November 1968 (age 57); Karlsruhe
- Education: University of California at Riverside; University of Tübingen
- Scientific career
- Workplaces: ETH Zurich; Yale University
- Thesis: Catalytic and allosteric roles of monovalent metal ion cofactors in the tryptophan synthase bienzyme complex (1996)
- Website: Weber-Ban Lab

Eilika Weber-Ban (born 15 November 1968 in Karlsruhe) is a German biochemist. Her research considers protein degradation pathways. She was elected to the European Molecular Biology Organization in 2021.

== Early life and education ==
Weber-Ban studied biochemistry at the University of Tübingen. She then received a Fulbright Program scholarship and went to the University of California at Riverside. Here she studied the tryptophan synthase bienzyme complex under the supervision of Michael Dunn. She completed her graduate studies in 1996, and was awarded a Jane Coffin Childs Memorial Fund for Medical Research fellowship to join Arthur Horwich at Yale University.

== Research and career ==
In 2001 she moved to the Institute for Molecular Biology and Biophysics at ETH Zurich. She was promoted to Professor in 2010. Her research considers the function and substrate recruitment mechanisms of bacterial degradation complexes, with a particular focus on Mycobacterium tuberculosis. Such bacteria rely on degradation pathways to survive the conditions inside the infected hosts.

Weber-Ban was elected to the European Molecular Biology Organization in 2021.

== Select publications ==
- Eilika Weber-Ban; Reid BG; Miranker AD; Horwich AL (1 September 1999). "Global unfolding of a substrate protein by the Hsp100 chaperone ClpA". Nature. 401 (6748): 90–93. doi:10.1038/43481. ISSN 1476-4687. PMID 10485712. Wikidata Q30322959.
- Jimena Weibezahn; Peter Tessarz; Christian Schlieker; et al. (1 November 2004). "Thermotolerance requires refolding of aggregated proteins by substrate translocation through the central pore of ClpB". Cell. 119 (5): 653–665. doi:10.1016/j.cell.2004.11.027. ISSN 0092-8674. PMID 15550247. Wikidata Q34369100.
- Markus Sutter; Daniel Boehringer; Sascha Gutmann; et al. (September 2008). "Structural basis of enzyme encapsulation into a bacterial nanocompartment". Nature Structural & Molecular Biology. 15 (9): 939–47. doi:10.1038/nsmb.1473. ISSN 1545-9993. PMID 19172747. Wikidata Q27653528.

== Personal life ==
Weber-Ban is married to Nenad Ban, a professor at ETH Zurich.
