= Friedrich Miescher Institute for Biomedical Research =

Facility in Basel, Switzerland

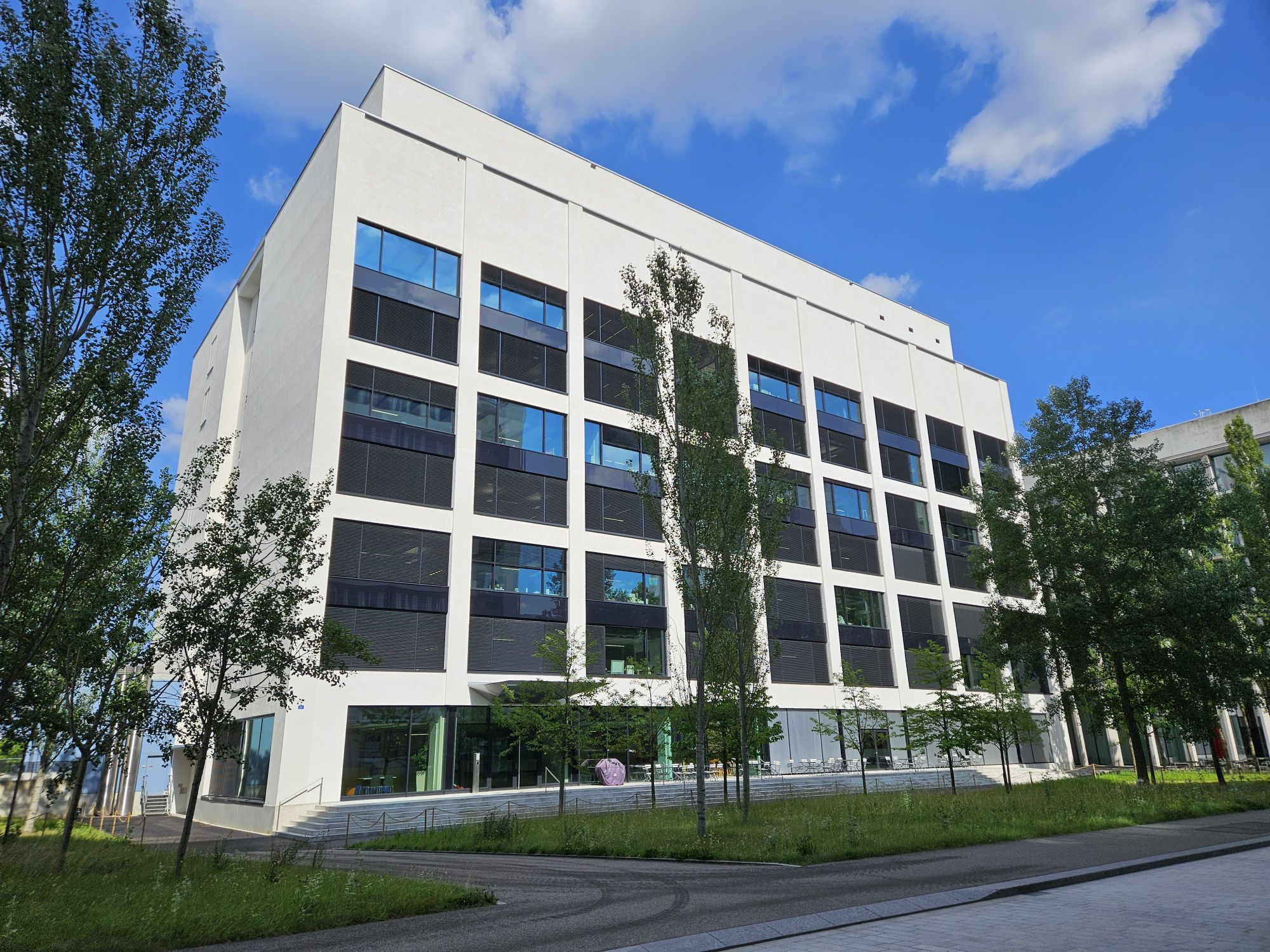
- FMI building in Basel, Switzerland
- Established: 1970
- Research type: Basic research (non-clinical)
- Field of research: Neurobiology; Genome Regulation; Multicellular Systems
- Director: Dirk Schübeler
- Location: Basel, Switzerland
- Affiliations: University of Basel
- Website: www.fmi.ch

The Friedrich Miescher Institute for Biomedical Research (FMI) is a biomedical research institute founded in 1970. Based in Basel, Switzerland, the FMI is affiliated with the University of Basel and the Novartis Institutes for BioMedical Research (NIBR). It is named after Friedrich Miescher. As of 2021, the FMI has around 340 collaborators, of which 20 are research group leaders, over 80 are postdoctoral collaborators and over 80 are postgraduate students participating in the FMI International PhD Program. The FMI is directed by Dirk Schübeler.

The FMI is member of EU-LIFE, an alliance of leading life sciences research centres in Europe.

== Scientific activities ==
The FMI is devoted to the pursuit of fundamental biomedical research. Areas of research are neurobiology, genome regulation, and multicellular systems.

Research is carried out in 20 independent but highly interactive research groups. In addition, several cutting-edge technology platforms – including microscopy & imaging, computational biology, functional genomics, proteomics, structural biology and more – support the research activities.

From 2014 to 2019, the FMI had the highest success rate for ERC grant applications of all European institutions.

== Research highlights ==
- Development of Western blotting technique to detect proteins.
- Publication of two protocols for plant transgenesis, which were widely used in the 1980s.
- Discovery that the gene for the human growth factor receptor 2 (ErbB2) is amplified in around 25% of primary breast tumors and dissection of its role in the pathogenesis and prognosis of breast cancer.
- Discovery of the key signaling kinase PKB (Akt) and demonstration of its central role in cancer cell signaling.
- First use of green fluorescent protein-tagged proteins in transfected cells and for live imaging in neurons.
- Description of method of action of everolimus on the mammalian target of rapamycin (mTOR) and provision of rational for its application in cancer.
- Isolation and characterization of human Dicer, the key enzyme in RNA interference and miRNA pathways.
- Development of MeDIP: a technique for monitoring DNA methylation genome-wide.
- New approach to restore vision in retinitis pigmentosa.

== Teaching and training ==
The FMI is an affiliated institute of the University of Basel. It provides biomedical research and career training for its 80–100 PhD students at a time. FMI selects its highly international student body during a twice-yearly interview-based selection program. Most FMI group leaders have adjunct or full professorships at the University of Basel in the Natural Sciences Faculty. In particular, the FMI participates actively in the teaching program of the Biozentrum of the University of Basel.

The FMI also offers training in biomedical research to postdoctoral fellows. It was designated by a survey of The Scientist in 2012, as the "best place for postdoctoral training" outside of the US.

== Patents and translational implementation ==
A goal of the FMI is the patenting of its discoveries and implementation of its basic research into pharmaceutical development.

== History ==
The Friedrich Miescher Institute for Biomedical Research is named after the Basel scientist Friedrich Miescher who discovered nucleic acids in the mid-19th century.

The FMI was founded in 1970, a hundred years after Miescher's discovery, as a collaborative effort of two Basel-based pharmaceutical companies, Ciba Aktiengesellschaft and J. R. Geigy Ltd. The founding charter describes the aims of the institute as to "pursue and promote basic research in the fields of biochemistry and medicine..." and "...to provide young scientists from all over the world with an opportunity to participate in scientific research." The Founding Director was Professor Hubert Bloch (died 1974) who had been Director of Research at Ciba Aktiengesellschaft, and Professor of Microbiology and Immunology at the University of Basel. He was an expert in tuberculosis and was also instrumental in the founding of the Institut Suisse pour les Recherches Experimentales sur la Cancer (ISREC), Epalinges, Switzerland. Between 1997 and 2012, the FMI was part of the Novartis Research Foundation. Since 2012 the FMI is an independent foundation.

=== Directors ===
List of the successive directors of the Friedrich Miescher Institute for Biomedical Research:

- 1970–1974: Hubert Bloch
- 1974–1974: Denis Monard
- 1974–1976: Matthys Staehelin
- 1976–1981: co-directorship of four-member Executive Committee
- 1982–1984: Edward Reich
- 1984–1987: Karl Heusler
- 1987–2001: Max M. Burger
- 2001–2002: Yves Alain Barde
- 2002–2004: Denis Monard
- 2004–2019: Susan M. Gasser.
- 2019–2020: Silvia Arber and Dirk Schübeler (co-directors ad interim)
- 2020– : Dirk Schübeler

== Friedrich Miescher Award ==
The Friedrich Miescher Award is Switzerland's highest honor for up-and-coming biochemical researchers. The award is granted every year by the Swiss Society for Biochemistry to the best scientific contribution in this field. Prize winners must be under 40 and must either be Swiss citizens or have conducted the prize-winning research in this country. The award was instituted in 1970, proposed and donated by the FMI. It is named after the Basel scientist who discovered DNA, Friedrich Miescher.

== See also ==
- Science and technology in Switzerland
