= Mackenzie Weygandt Mathis =

American neuroscientist

- Born: United States
- Education: University of Oregon, Harvard University
- Known for: DeepLabCut, CEBRA
- Awards: Harvard Rowland Fellow, ELLIS Society Scholar, FENS EJN 2022 Young Investigator Award, Eric Kandel Young Neuroscientist Prize 2023, Bing Prize 2024, Swiss Science Prize Latsis 2024, SGV Award 2025
- Scientific career
- Fields: Neuroscience, Machine Learning, Computer Vision
- Workplaces: École Polytechnique Fédérale de Lausanne, Rowland Institute at Harvard University
- Thesis: (2017)
- Website: www.mackenziemathislab.org

Mackenzie Weygandt Mathis is an American scientist, software developer, and faculty at the École Polytechnique Fédérale de Lausanne. Her research asks how the brain adapts to a changing world, aiming to uncover internal models and the mechanisms of adaptive sensorimotor behavior in intelligent systems—“adaptive intelligence”. Her lab studies adaptive processes in animals and develops new artificial intelligence (AI) methods to inform adaptive AI systems and translational research.

== Early life and education ==
Mathis conducted her undergraduate education at the University of Oregon receiving a bachelors of science in 2007. She then worked as a senior research technician and lab manager at the Project A.L.S. Laboratory for Stem Cell Research at Columbia University from 2007 to 2012. Working under the mentorship of Dr. Christopher E. Henderson and Dr. Hynek Wichterle, Mathis modelled amyotrophic lateral sclerosis (A.L.S.) using stem cell-derived motor neurons. During her time in the lab, she published two first author scientific papers, one in the Journal of Neuroscience which offered a novel protocol for generating human limb-innervating neural subtypes in vitro for use in neurological disease research, and the other in Nature Biotechnology on benchmarking iPS stem cell lines ability to make motor neurons. Mathis then moved to Boston and joined the graduate program in molecular and cellular biology (MCB) at Harvard University. On her way to completing her PhD, she also completed a master's degree. During her PhD, Mathis conducted research on the neural circuits underlying reward prediction errors under the mentorship of Professor Naoshige Uchida at the Harvard Center for Brain Science. In her first year as a graduate student, Mathis received an National Science Foundation Fellowship to fund her graduate research. Mathis was able to merge her interests in motor control with Uchida's expertise in neural recordings and behavioral analysis to forge a new scientific direction in the lab and publish a first author paper in Neuron by the end of her PhD regarding the essential role played by the somatosensory cortex in forelimb motor adaptation in rodents. Near the end of her PhD Mathis was awarded the Rowland Fellowship which provided five years of funding to start her own lab at Harvard's Rowland Institute in Cambridge, MA. Prior to founding the Mathis Lab at Harvard, Mathis was also awarded the Women & the Brain (WATB) Fellowship for Advancement in Brain Science which provided her with the funding to work in Germany in the summer of 2017 under the mentorship of Professor Matthias Bethge at the University of Tübingen.

== Career and research ==
In 2017, Mathis started her lab at the Rowland Institute at Harvard University with a goal of reverse engineering neural circuits that drive adaptive motor behavior. Through large-scale neural recordings and building novel robotic and machine learning tools, the M-Lab of Adaptive Intelligence probes neural circuits and analyzes behavioral outputs to better understand how brain function relates to behavior. In her early faculty work at Harvard, Mathis focused on pioneering deep learning tools for behavioral analysis. Her lab developed DeepLabCut, a deep learning tool to track animal posture over time. This tool relies on transfer learning to optimize an ImageNet-pretrained foundation model and the feature detectors from DeeperCut, to fine-tune on a desired new dataset after sufficient training. Now the package includes many more networks, including their own DLCRNet with pose tracking and re-identification of animals. Mathis has shown the versatility of this tool on many diverse datasets highlighting the robust design and potential for wide use in fields even beyond neuroscience.

Mathis also developed the software and patented algorithm CEBRA. CEBRA is a machine-learning method that can be used to compress time series in a way that reveals otherwise hidden structures in the variability of the data. It excels at processing behavioural and neural data recorded simultaneously, and it can decode activity from the visual cortex of the mouse brain to reconstruct a viewed video. This method has been used on a diversity of species, including humans for high-performance brain–machine interfaces.

Mathis’ research on sensorimotor control and learning focuses on how animals adapt their movements in response to changing conditions by building and updating internal models that predict the outcomes of actions. Her lab investigates how the nervous system generates and refines these predictions, and how error signals guide adaptation when predictions fail. Using large-scale neural recordings in mice combined with naturalistic, skilled behavioral tasks, she examines the neural dynamics that link movement, posture, and proprioceptive feedback. A central theme of her work is disentangling the distinct roles of sensory and motor brain areas in encoding proprioception, muscle states, and kinematics during learning and motor adaptation.

Mathis is focused on the concept of open science and as such, the deep learning tools she designed are open access such that researchers worldwide have access to the code in order to use this tool to analyze animal behaviors and joint neural-behavioral data in an unbiased way to inform a better understanding of how neural activity drives specific behaviors. Moreover, she developed the DeepLabCut AI Residency Program that hosts workshops and residents in her lab that come from underrepresented groups in computer science.

As of August 2020, Mathis moved to the Swiss Federal Institute of Technology, Lausanne, working within the Brain Mind Institute as a tenure-track Professor, and was tenured in 2026. The lab is hosted at the Campus Biotech in Geneva, Switzerland, where Mathis holds the Bertarelli Foundation Chair of Integrative Neuroscience. Her work has been featured in Nature, Bloomberg Business Week, and The Atlantic.

== Awards and honors ==
- 2025: SGV Award
- 2024: Swiss Science Prize Latsis
- 2024: Robert Bing Prize
- 2023: Eric Kandel Young Neuroscientist Prize
- 2022: FENS EJN Young Investigator Prize
- 2020: Bertarelli Foundation Chair of Integrative Neuroscience
- 2019 - 2023: CZI Essential Open Source Software for Science - grant for DeepLabCut
- 2019 - : Ellis Society Fellow, Natural Intelligence
- 2018: Mind, Brain & Behavior Harvard University Faculty Award
- 2018: eLife Travel Grant Award Winner
- 2017: NVIDIA GPU Grant
- 2017 - 2022: Rowland Fellowship
- 2017: Women & the Brain Fellowship for Advancement of Neuroscience
- 2013 - 2018: National Science Foundation Graduate Research Fellowship Life Sciences – Neuroscience
- 2013, ’14, ’16: Harvard University Certificate of Distinction in Teaching (MCB80, MCB145)
- 2014: Dr. Ernest Peralta Fund Award for Best Qualifying Exam proposal & defense, Harvard
- 2012 - 2013: Morris E. Zukerman Graduate Fellowship - awarded to top students in brain sciences at Harvard GSAS

== Publications ==
Mackenzie Weygandt Mathis publications indexed by Google Scholar

== Personal life ==
In her youth, she showed horses competitively in the US.
