= Neural adaptation =

Phenomenon of the nervous system

Neural adaptation or sensory adaptation is a gradual decrease over time in the responsiveness of the sensory system to a constant stimulus. It is usually experienced as a change in the stimulus. For example, if a hand is rested on a table, the table's surface is immediately felt against the skin. Subsequently, however, the sensation of the table surface against the skin gradually diminishes until it is virtually unnoticeable. The sensory neurons that initially respond are no longer stimulated to respond; this is an example of neural adaptation.

All sensory and neural systems have a form of adaptation to constantly detect changes in the environment. Neural receptor cells that process and receive stimulation go through constant changes for mammals and other living organisms to sense vital changes in their environment. Some key players in several neural systems include Ca^{2+}ions (see Calcium in biology) that send negative feedback in second messenger pathways that allow the neural receptor cells to close or open channels in response to the changes of ion flow. There are also mechanoreception systems that use calcium inflow to physically affect certain proteins and move them to close or open channels.

Functionally, it is highly possible that adaptation may enhance the limited response range of neurons to encode sensory signals with much larger dynamic ranges by shifting the range of stimulus amplitudes. Also, in neural adaptation there is a sense of returning to baseline from a stimulated response. Recent work suggests that these baseline states are actually determined by long-term adaptation to the environment. Varying rates or speed of adaptation is an important indicator for tracking different rates of change in the environment or the organism itself.

Current research shows that although adaptation occurs at multiple stages of each sensory pathway, it is often stronger and more stimulus specific at "cortical" level rather than "subcortical stages". In short, neural adaptation is thought to happen at a more central level at the cortex.

== Fast and slow adaptation ==
There is fast adaptation and slow adaptation. Fast adaptation occurs immediately after a stimulus is presented i.e., within hundreds of milliseconds. Slow adaptive processes can take minutes, hours or even days. The two classes of neural adaptation may rely on very different physiological mechanisms. The time scale over which adaptation builds up and recovers depends on the time course of stimulation. Brief stimulation produces adaptation which occurs and recovers while more prolonged stimulation can produce slower and more lasting forms of adaptation. Also, repeated sensory stimulation appears to temporarily decrease the gain of thalamocortical synaptic transmission. Adaptation of cortical responses was stronger and recovered more slowly. Vastly different timescales of adaptation have also been shown to be implemented on the single neuron level, where they can give rise to time-scale free adaptation. At the very extreme of evolutionary timescales, neurons in different parts of retina have been found deploy differing amounts of lateral inhibition to compensate for the high dynamic range between the ground and the sky.

== History ==
In the late 1800s, Hermann Helmholtz, a German physician and physicist, extensively researched conscious sensations and different types of perception. He defined sensations as the "raw elements" of conscious experience that required no learning, and perceptions as the meaningful interpretations derived from the senses. He studied the physical properties of the eye and vision, as well as acoustic sensation. In one of his classic experiments regarding how space perception could be altered by experience, participants wore glasses that distorted the visual field by several degrees to the right. Participants were asked to look at an object, close their eyes, and try to reach out and touch it. At first, the subjects reached for the object too far to the left, but after a few trials were able to correct themselves.

Prismatic reversing glasses (upside down goggles with two prisms)

Helmholtz theorized that perceptual adaptation might result from a process he referred to as unconscious inference, where the mind unconsciously adopts certain rules in order to make sense of what is perceived of the world. An example of this phenomenon is when a ball appears to be getting smaller and smaller, the mind will then infer that the ball is moving away from them.

In the 1890s, psychologist George M. Stratton conducted experiments in which he tested the theory of perceptual adaptation. In one experiment, he wore a reversing glasses for 21½ hours over three days. After removing the glasses, "normal vision was restored instantaneously and without any disturbance in the natural appearance or position of objects."

Modern version of inverting mirrors with harness

On a later experiment, Stratton wore the glasses for eight whole days. By day four, the images seen through the instrument were still upside down. However, on day five, images appeared upright until he concentrated on them; then they became inverted again. By having to concentrate on his vision to turn it upside down again, especially when he knew images were hitting his retinas in the opposite orientation as normal, Stratton deduced his brain had adapted to the changes in vision.

Stratton also conducted experiments where he wore glasses that altered his visual field by 45°. His brain was able to adapt to the change and perceive the world as normal. Also, the field can be altered making the subject see the world upside down. But, as the brain adjusts to the change, the world appears "normal."

In some extreme experiments, psychologists have tested to see if a pilot can fly a plane with altered vision. All of the pilots that were fitted with the goggles that altered their vision were able to safely navigate the aircraft with ease.

== Visual ==
Adaptation is considered to be the cause of perceptual phenomena like afterimages and the motion aftereffect. In the absence of fixational eye movements, visual perception may fade out or disappear due to neural adaptation. (See Adaptation (eye)). When an observer's visual stream adapts to a single direction of real motion, imagined motion can be perceived at various speeds. If the imagined motion is in the same direction as that experienced during adaptation, imagined speed is slowed; when imagined motion is in the opposite direction, its speed is increased; when adaptation and imagined motions are orthogonal, imagined speed is unaffected. Studies using magnetoencephalography (MEG) have demonstrated that subjects exposed to a repeated visual stimulus at brief intervals become attenuated to the stimulus in comparison to the initial stimulus. The results revealed that visual responses to the repeated compared with novel stimulus showed a significant reduction in both activation strength and peak latency but not in the duration of neural processing.

Although motion and images are extremely important regarding adaptation, the most important adaptation is adjusting to brightness levels. On entering a dark room or a very brightly lit room it takes a little while to adjust to the different levels. Adjusting to brightness levels allows mammals to detect changes in their surrounding. This is called dark adaptation.

== Auditory ==
Auditory adaptation, as perceptual adaptation with other senses, is the process by which individuals adapt to sounds and noises. As research has shown, as time progresses, individuals tend to adapt to sounds and tend to distinguish them less frequently after a while. Sensory adaptation tends to blend sounds into one, variable sound, rather than having several separate sounds as a series. Moreover, after repeated perception, individuals tend to adapt to sounds to the point where they no longer consciously perceive it, or rather, "block it out". An individual that lives close to the train tracks, will eventually stop noticing the sounds of passing trains. Similarly, individuals living in larger cities no longer notice traffic sounds after a while. Moving to a completely different area, such as a quiet countryside, that individual would then be aware of the silence, crickets, etc.

The mechanoreception of sound requires a specific set of receptor cells called hair cells that allow for gradient signals to pass onto spatial ganglia where the signal will be sent to the brain to be processed. Since this is mechanoreception, different from chemoreception, adaptation of sound from surroundings highly depends on the physical movement of opening and closing of cation channels on the hair cell stereocilia. Mechanoelectric transduction (MET) channels, located at the tops of stereocilia, are poised to detect tension induced by hair bundle deflection. Hair bundle deflection generates a force by pulling on tip link proteins connecting adjacent stereocilia.

== Olfactory ==
Perceptual adaptation is a phenomenon that occurs for all of the senses, including smell and touch. An individual can adapt to a certain smell with time. Smokers, or individuals living with smokers, tend to stop noticing the smell of cigarettes after some time, whereas people not exposed to smoke on a regular basis will notice the smell instantly. The same phenomenon can be observed with other types of smell, such as perfume, flowers, etc. The human brain can distinguish smells that are unfamiliar to the individual, while adapting to those it is used to and no longer require to be consciously recognized.

Olfactory neurons utilize a feedback system from the levels of Ca^{2+}ions to activate its adaptation to prolonged smells. Due to the fact that the olfactory signal transduction uses a second messenger transduction system, the mechanism of adaptation includes several factors that mostly include CaMK or calmodulin bound to Ca^{2+}ions.

== Somatosensory ==
This phenomenon also applies to the sense of touch. An unfamiliar piece of clothing that was just put on will be noticed instantly; however, once it has been worn for a while, the mind will adapt to its texture and ignore the stimulus.

=== Pain ===
While large mechanosensory neurons such as type I/group Aβ display adaptation, smaller type IV/group C nociceptive neurons do not. As a result, pain does not usually subside rapidly but persists for long periods of time; in contrast, other sensory information is quickly adapted to, if surroundings remain constant.

=== Weight training ===
Studies have shown that there is neural adaptation after as little as one weight training session. Strength gains are experienced by subjects without any increased muscle size. Muscle surface recordings using electromyographic (SEMG) techniques have found that early strength gains throughout training are associated with increased amplitude in SEMG activity. These findings along with various other theories explain increases in strength without increases in muscle mass. Other theories for increases in strength relating to neural adaptation include: agonist-antagonist muscle decreased co-activation, motor unit synchronization, and motor unit increased firing rates.

Neural adaptations contribute to changes in V-waves and Hoffmann's reflex. H-reflex can be used to assess the excitability of spinal α-motoneurons, whereas V-wave measures the magnitude of motor output from α-motoneurons. Studies showed that after a 14-week resistance training regime, subjects expressed V-wave amplitude increases of ~50% and H-reflex amplitude increases of ~20%. This showed that neural adaptation accounts for changes to functional properties of the spinal cord circuitry in humans without affecting organization of the motor cortex.

== Habituation vs. adaptation ==
The terms neural adaptation and habituation are often confused for one another. Habituation is a behavioral phenomenon while neural adaptation is a physiological phenomenon, although the two are not entirely separate. During habituation, one has some conscious control over whether one notices something to which one is becoming habituated. However, when it comes to neural adaptation, one has no conscious control over it. For example, if one has adapted to something (like an odor or perfume), one can not consciously force themselves to smell that thing. Neural adaptation is tied very closely to stimulus intensity; as the intensity of a light increases, one's senses will adapt more strongly to it. In comparison, habituation can vary depending on the stimulus. With a weak stimulus habituation can occur almost immediately but with a strong stimulus the animal may not habituate at all e.g. a cool breeze versus a fire alarm. Habituation also has a set of characteristics that must be met to be termed a habituation process.

== Rhythmic behaviors ==
=== Short-term adaptations ===
Short term neural adaptations occur in the body during rhythmic activities. One of the most common activities when these neural adaptations are constantly happening is walking. As a person walks, the body constantly gathers information about the environment and the surroundings of the feet, and slightly adjusts the muscles in use according to the terrain. For example, walking uphill requires different muscles than walking on flat pavement. When the brain recognizes that the body is walking uphill, it makes neural adaptations that send more activity to muscles required for uphill walking. The rate of neural adaptation is affected by the area of the brain and by the similarity between sizes and shapes of previous stimuli. Adaptations in the inferior temporal gyrus are very dependent on previous stimuli being of similar size, and somewhat dependent on previous stimuli being of a similar shape. Adaptations in the prefrontal cortex are less dependent on previous stimuli being of similar size and shape.

=== Long-term adaptations ===
Some rhythmic movements, such as respiratory movements, are essential for survival. Because these movements must be used over the course of the entire lifetime, it is important for them to function optimally. Neural adaptation has been observed in these movements in response to training or altered external conditions. Animals have been shown to have reduced breathing rates in response to better fitness levels. Since breathing rates were not conscious changes made by the animal, it is presumed that neural adaptations occur for the body to maintain a slower breathing rate.

== Transcranial magnetic stimulation ==
Transcranial magnetic stimulation (TMS) is an important technique in modern cognitive neuropsychology that is used to investigate the perceptual and behavioral effects of temporary interference of neural processing. Studies have shown that when a subject's visual cortex is disrupted by TMS, the subject views colorless flashes of light, or phosphenes. When a subjects’ vision was subjected to the constant stimulus of a single color, neural adaptations occurred that made the subjects used to the color. Once this adaptation had occurred, TMS was used to disrupt the subjects’ visual cortex again, and the flashes of light viewed by the subject were the same color as the constant stimulus before the disruption.

== Drug induced ==
Neural adaptation can occur for other than natural means. Antidepressant drugs, such as those that cause down regulation of β-adrenergic receptors, can cause rapid neural adaptations in the brain. By creating a quick adaptation in the regulation of these receptors, it is possible for drugs to reduce the effects of stress on those taking the medication.

== Post-injury ==
Neural adaptation is often critical for an animal's survival after an injury. In the short-term, it may alter an animal's movements so as to prevent worsening the injury. In the long-term, it may enable the animal's full or partial recovery from the injury.

=== Brain injury ===
Studies in children with early childhood brain injuries have shown that neural adaptations slowly occur after the injury. Children with early injuries to the linguistics, spatial cognition and affective development areas of the brain showed deficits in those areas as compared to those without injury. Due to neural adaptations, however, by early school-age, considerable development to those areas was observed.

=== Leg injury ===
After the amputation of a front leg, the fruit fly (Drosophila melanogaster) shows immediate changes in body position and walking kinematics that enable it to continue walking. The fruit fly exhibits longer-term adaptations as well. Researchers found that, immediately after amputation of a hind leg, flies favored turning away from the injured side. However, after several days, this bias disappeared, and the flies turned left and right evenly, as they had before the injury. These researchers compared flies with functioning versus impaired proprioception — the body's sense of where it is in space — and found that without proprioception, flies did not exhibit the same recovery from a turning bias after injury. This result indicates that proprioceptive information is necessary for some of the neural adaptation that occurs in Drosophila after a leg injury.

== See also ==
- Acclimatization (neurons), the process by which neural adaptation is usually believed to occur
- Adaptive system
- fMRIa
- Neuroplasticity
