= Kalanit Grill-Spector =

American psychologist

- כלנית גריל-ספקטור
- Education: PhD
- Known for: fMRI adaptation, neural basis of high level vision, development of visual system, topographic deep neural networks
- Scientific career
- Fields: cognitive neuroscience developmental neuroscience vision cognitive computational modeling
- Workplaces: Weizmann Institute of Science, MIT, Stanford University
- Doctoral advisor: Rafael Malach
- Other academic advisors: Nancy Kanwisher

Kalanit Grill-Spector (Hebrew: כלנית גריל-ספקטור), is a cognitive neuroscientist, the Susan S and William H Hindle Professor of Psychology at Stanford University and a member of the Wu Tsai Neurosciences Institute at Stanford University. Her research investigates how the human visual cortex is organized functionally and anatomically, how it develops, and how its neural computations give rise to visual perception. Her work has advanced understanding of the functional organization and development of the human visual cortex and inspired biologically grounded computational models of cortical organization.

== Education ==
Grill-Spector received her undergraduate degree in Electrical Engineering and Computer Science from Ben-Gurion University of the Negev. She completed her Ph.D. Weizmann Institute of Science under Rafael Malach, where she investigated the functional organization of human visual cortex using functional magnetic resonance imaging (fMRI). She subsequently carried out postdoctoral research with Nancy Kanwisher at the Massachusetts Institute of Technology before joining the faculty at Stanford University in 2001. At Stanford she is Professor of Psychology, directing the vision perception neuroscience lab, a member of the Wu Tsai Neurosciences Institute, and is affiliated with the Symbolic Systems Program and the Neurosciences Graduate Program.

== Research ==
Grill-Spector's research investigates the functional and structural organization, development, and computational principles of the human visual cortex and how they support visual perception. Her work combines functional MRI, quantitative MRI, diffusion MRI, intracranial electrophysiology, psychophysics, and computational modeling to study the neural mechanisms underlying visual perception and categorization.

=== Functional organization of human high-level visual cortex ===
Grill-Spector's research focuses on how the human brain represents visual information and supports visual recognition, face recognition, reading, and categorization. A major focus of Grill-Spector's research has been understanding the functional and structural organization of high-level visual cortex.

During her doctoral research she pioneered with Rafael Malach fMRI adaptation, a method that uses repeated functional MRI measurements to study the selectivity of neural populations. The approach has been widely used in cognitive neuroscience to investigate the representations underlying perception, memory, language, and decision making.

Her research characterized the organization of high-level visual cortex, characterizing shape and object representations in the lateral occipital complex (LOC) and establishing organizing principles of the ventral visual stream including how cortical representations of faces, objects, places, and words are arranged in ventral temporal cortex (VTC) to support visual categorization.

Her laboratory investigated how the functional organization of high-level visual cortex relates to brain anatomy across multiple spatial scales, demonstrating systematic relationships with cortical folding, cytoarchitectonic subdivisions of ventral temporal cortex, and patterns of white matter connectivity, further showing that these organizing principles are present from birth.

=== Neural responses and visual perception ===
Another major theme of Grill-Spector's research is investigating how neural responses in human visual cortex relate to visual perception. Her work showed that activity in high-level visual cortex is linked to visual recognition, including the LOC and VTC and face detection and identification in face-selective regions of the fusiform gyrus. Subsequent collaborative work using intracranial recordings and direct electrical stimulation in neurosurgical patients provided evidence for the causal role of face-selective regions in the fusiform gyrus in face perception.

=== Development of the human visual system ===
Grill-Spector has investigated how the human visual system develops from infancy through adulthood. Her research demonstrated differential developmental trajectories across high-level visual cortex, showing that cortical face-selective responses are detectable by 4–6 months of age, yet face-selective cortex undergoes particularly prolonged development throughout childhood and adolescence, in contrast to object- and place-selective cortex, which become adult-like by adolescence.

Longitudinal and cross-sectional fMRI studies provided evidence for cortical recycling during childhood, showing that regions of ventral temporal cortex involved in visual processing of limbs in young children are repurposed for visual processing of faces and words during adolescence.

Her laboratory subsequently investigated the anatomical development of the visual system using quantitative MRI, diffusion MRI, and histology. This work showed that major white matter pathways are present in infancy and continue to undergo myelination and structural refinement throughout development. It further showed that the visual cortex undergoes hierarchical microstructural development, with early visual areas being more mature at birth but developing more slowly postnatal than higher-level visual areas, and that developmental changes in cortical function are accompanied by changes in tissue microstructure of the ventral temporal cortex.

=== Computational modeling of visual cortex ===
Grill-Spector has used computational modeling to investigate how visual information is integrated across the visual hierarchy. Her research applied population receptive field (pRF) modeling to study spatial summation in high-level visual cortex and its role in face perception.

Her laboratory subsequently developed a computational and empirical framework for estimating spatiotemporal pRFs from fMRI, showing that spatial and temporal integration windows increase systematically across the visual hierarchy and that higher visual areas increasingly prioritize rapid temporal changes while exhibiting greater tolerance to variation in stimulus extent within their receptive fields.

In collaboration with Daniel Yamins and students, Grill-Spector developed topographic deep neural networks (TDANNs), computational models that model the functional and spatial organization of the entire visual processing hierarchy. Results showed that TDANNs with a spatial constraint that encourages nearby units on the cortical sheet to have similar responses, combined with self-supervised learning, are sufficient to account for the functional organization of visual cortex across multiple spatial scales, from fine-scale orientation columns in primary visual cortex, to clusters of category-selectivity in ventral temporal cortex, to the large-scale organization of multiple visual streams. This work provides a unified computational framework for understanding the emergence of functional organization in visual cortex.

== Editorial activities ==
Grill-Spector has served as an Editor for the Journal of Vision (2008–2012) and Neuropsychologia (2016–2018).

== Awards ==
Grill-Spector has received the Human Sciences Frontier Fellowship, the Sloan Fellowship, the Klingenstein Fellowship in Neuroscience, and the Whitehall Foundation award.. Her research is funded by the National Science Foundation and the National Eye Institute.
