= Olga Bridgman =

American physician and academic (1886–1974)

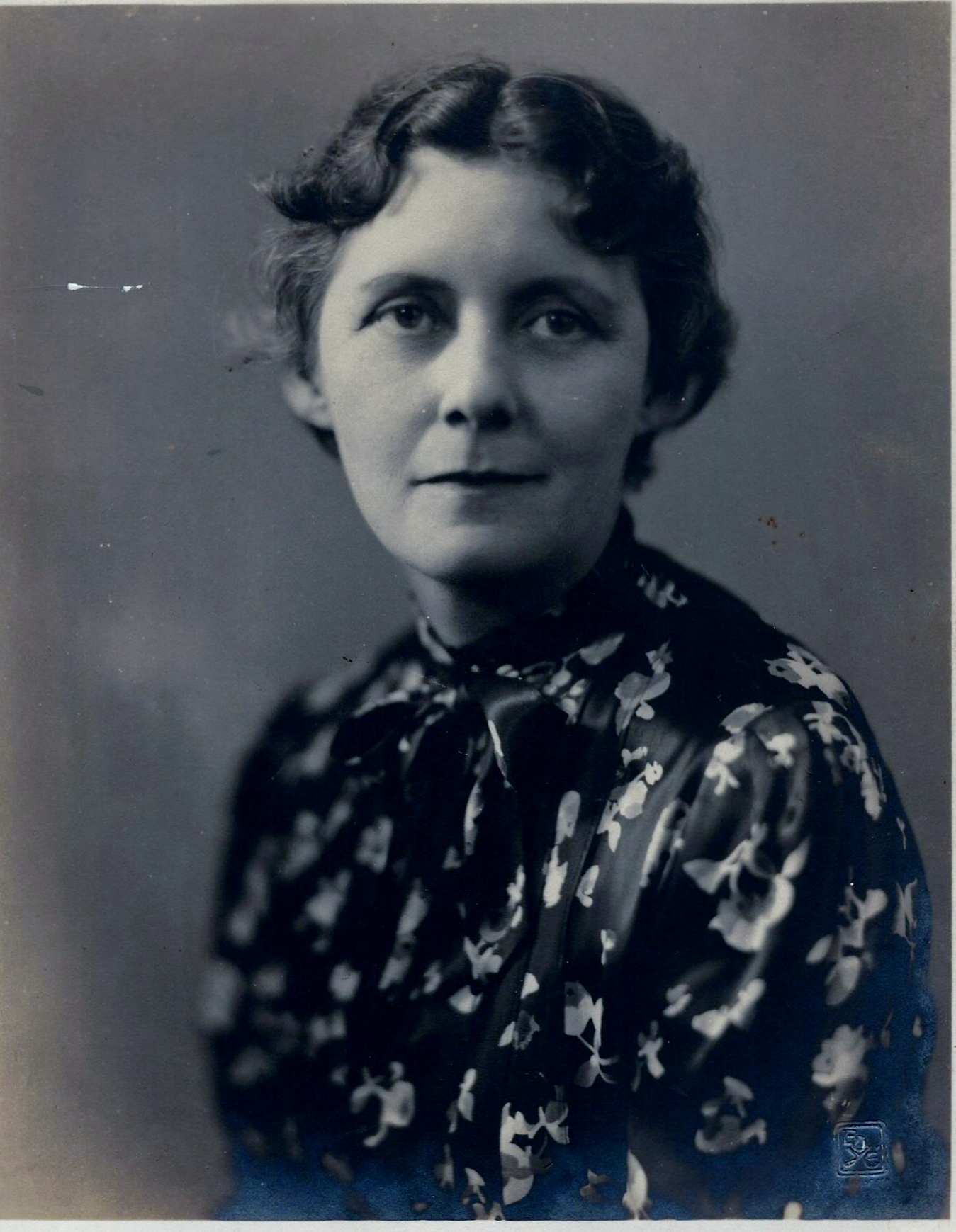
Olga Bridgman

Olga Bridgman (March 30, 1886 – February 6, 1974) was an American physician and Professor Emeritus of Psychology at University of California, San Francisco and Berkeley.

== Early life ==
Olga Bridgman was born in Jackson, Michigan, on March 30, 1886, the daughter of Edwin Chester Bridgman (1862-1929), a prominent newspaper editor, and Alma Louise Antonia Goecker (1862-1943). Her paternal family migrated from England to Connecticut in 1690. She had two siblings: Dorothy E. Tefft (1887-1915) and Donald C. Bridgman (1887-1967).

She attended public schools in Jackson and then attended the University of Michigan at Ann Arbor, obtaining a A.B. in 1908 and a M.D. in 1910. In 1913 she attended the University of California, Berkeley, obtaining a Psychology M.A. in 1914 and a Ph.D. in 1915. She was the first person to earn a doctoral degree in psychology at the University of California, Berkeley.

In 1937 she was given an honorary degree of Doctor of Science by Mills College.

== Career ==
After graduation from University of Michigan at Ann Arbor, Olga Bridgman worked as resident physician in two Illinois public institutions and then moved to New Jersey to collaborate with Henry H. Goddard on a version of the Binet's mental tests, the first to be developed in the United States.

In 1915 she was appointed instructor in abnormal psychology and pediatrics at University of California, working with George M. Stratton and Warner Brown in what would become the Department of Psychology in 1922. She was professor of Psychology and Pediatrics at University of California, on both San Francisco and Berkeley, for more than forty years, becoming Professor Emeritus in 1956.

She was: psychologist in San Francisco Juvenile Court; medical psychologist for the San Francisco Board of Health; director of the San Francisco Bureau of Mental Hygiene, Department of Health; consultant to the California State School for the Deaf; consultant to the Langley Porter Clinic. She was interested in child guidance, juvenile delinquency, and mental hygiene.

In 1947 she organized the American Board of Professional Psychology.

She was an author of articles in journals on mental hygiene, delinquency, Delinquency and mental deficiency.

She was active in civic work.

She was a member of the Women's Faculty Club at University of California and the San Francisco Women's City Club. She was a Diplomate in Psychiatry of the American Board of Neurology and Psychiatry.

== Personal life ==
Olga Bridgman moved to California in 1913 and lived at 1380 Monterey Blvd., San Francisco, California.

She died on February 6, 1974, at San Mateo, California, and is buried at Cypress Lawn Memorial Park, Colma.
