= Knight Dunlap =

American psychologist (1875–1949)

- Born: November 21, 1875; Diamond Spring, California, US
- Died: August 14, 1949 (aged 73); Columbia, South Carolina, US
- Known for: Past president, American Psychological Association
- Scientific career
- Fields: Psychology

Knight Dunlap (November 21, 1875 – August 14, 1949) was an American psychologist. He founded the Journal of Psychology, was the first editor of the Journal of Comparative Psychology, and was the President of the American Psychological Association. Dunlap authored numerous books and articles regarding psychology and was a talented inventor. His concentration was in experimental psychology and some of his best known inventions were the Dunlap chronoscope, the Dunlap tapping plate, and the Dunlap chair for vestibular investigation.

== Early life ==
Dunlap grew up in rural California and was educated at the University of California, Berkeley. It was here that he was inspired to study psychology by George M. Stratton, a man for whom he held deep respect. Stratton made Dunlap realize the possibilities of experimental psychology. Once he completed his undergraduate at the University of California, Berkeley, he went to Harvard University to complete his doctorate.

== Career ==
Upon completing his doctorate at Harvard, he returned to the University of California, Berkeley as a psychology professor for a few years and then joined the staff at Johns Hopkins University in 1906. He held the title of Professor of Experimental Psychology and remained there for 20 years. His time at Hopkins was split with his brief service with the Medical Research Laboratory of the Air Service during World War I, and by his duties as the Chairman of the Division of Anthropology and Psychology, National Research Council, during 1927–1929. He was appointed president of the American Psychological Association in 1922. His research work in the army led to an interest in vestibular work. While working at Johns Hopkins, Dunlap had met John B. Watson, who is known best for establishing the psychological school of behaviorism. The two had worked together in the psychology department of Johns Hopkins and had a strong influence on each other's work and theories. Dunlap and Watson's views on behaviorism differed significantly. Dunlap tried to dissociate himself from Watson's behaviorism and thought it was derivative of scientific psychology. Unfortunately, however, most of his works, experiments, and other contributions were overshadowed by his colleague, John Watson. Dunlap developed a form of paradoxical therapy called 'negative practice' "making an effort to do the things that one has been making an effort not to do." through this procedure he hoped to extinguish the troublesome behavior by perhaps "bringing under voluntary control responses which had been involuntary." (Paradoxical Psychotherapy, Weeks and L'Abate p. 9)

In 1938, after serving some time for the APA, he argued against many of Freud's psychoanalysis ideas. He was most against the idea of introspective and consciousness ideals brought up by Freud. This led him to write one of his most famous works “Are there any instincts?” Instead, he focused more on behaviorism and is credited with the title “response psychology”. Response psychology, or Stimulus Response Theory, is simply defined as the interplay of a stimulus and behavior. In 1936, Dunlap joined the faculty of the University of California, Los Angeles as Professor and Chairman of the department of Psychology. He remained there until he retired in 1946. During his time there Dunlap also wrote a pretty bold article about treating color blindness. His article, entitled, “Color Blindness and its Therapy” was published in the Australian Journal of Optometry in 1945. In his article, he argued against the idea of sex-linked colorblindness and equal affected of males and females. Dunlap reported on Loken's experiment regarding colorblind individuals. A control group was to read a special color chart, and an experimental group was to do the same. The control group was given a “milk sugar” as a placebo and the experimental group was given dosages of vitamin A. Results showed that there were much less errors in the naming of colors for those who took the vitamin A dosage.

Dunlap died in South Carolina in 1949.

Dunlap wrote many books and articles detailing his theories and experimental work, including those that featured his inventions. Some of his most noteworthy texts are: Social Psychology (1925), Civilized Life (1934), The Dramatic Personality of Jesus (1933), Its Functions in Human Life (1946), A System of Psychology (1912), Psychobiology (1914), Personal Beauty and Racial Betterment (1920), Mysticism, Freudianism and Scientific Psychology (1920), Old and New Viewpoints in Psychology (1925), Elements of Scientific Psychology (1922, 1928, 1936), Habits: Their Making and Unmaking (1932) and many more. These then became the basis for future research in the field of Psychology.

Along with being an accomplished writer, Dunlap was also an inventor who used his devices to aid in his experiments. His most noteworthy inventions include the Dunlap chronoscope, the Dunlap tapping plate, and the Dunlap chair for vestibular research.

The Dunlap Chronoscope (or the Johns Hopkins Chronoscope) was a device that was used in order to measure brief time intervals. Dunlap improved the chonoscope so that it made less noise, did not need to be wound up, ran for longer periods of time, had a large, easy to read dial, and the hand automatically reset to zero. These improvements made it easier to operate and did not require the experimenter to have to do any subtraction, which made studying reaction time easier.

The Dunlap tapping plate was a tablet like apparatus that had an attached stylus. It was used in order to measure the number of taps made, the pressure exerted by the participant on the plate, as well as the grip strength exerted. All of these aided researchers in their ability to investigate the participants ability to be efficient at the task at hand.

Finally, there was the Dunlap chair for vestibular research, which was a chair that was attached to a rotating device that allowed the researchers to easily rotate a person while they are sitting down. This chair became particularly helpful for his research with the Army in WWI, where he used this chair to measure vestibular activity in the soldiers’ brains after experiencing war events.

== Association with John Watson ==
Knight Dunlap met John Watson during his time at UCLA and they continued to work together at Johns Hopkins University. They quickly became associates in the field of behavioral psychology and worked on many projects and experiments together. In fact, most of Dunlap's views were “tweaked” by Watson in order to seem more rational to other psychologists. Watson investigated Dunlap's The Case of Introspection (1912). John Watson initially had a strong view on imagery, which Dunlap had skepticism about, leading Watson to drop his own views of imagery, and focus more of his studies on behaviorism. However, their views on behaviorism differed slightly. John Watson was a heavy promoter for radical behaviorism, but Dunlap criticized this theory and proposed his own “response psychology”. In their memoirs and journals both Dunlap and Watson wrote about how their works had a reciprocal impact on each other. Each of the psychologists shaped the views on modern behaviorism, and were very interested in changing the ideas of introspection and instinct proposed by Freud. Unfortunately, though, Watson's name is more renowned and he has overshadowed the work of his colleague, Dunlap. The name Knight Dunlap is not as well known in the field of behaviorism, and he partially blames himself as seen in his journals. Dunlap states that his “lack of boldness” made him “unnoteworthy” compared to his colleague.
