= FMRI adaptation =

- Purpose: functional magnetic resonance imaging reads the brain changes via stimulus

Functional magnetic resonance imaging adaptation (FMRIa) is a method of functional magnetic resonance imaging that reads the brain changes occurring in response to long exposure to evocative stimulus. If Stimulus 1 (S_{1}) excites a certain neuronal population, repeated exposure to S_{1} will result in subsequently attenuated responses. This adaptation may be due to neural fatigue or coupled hemodynamic processes. However, when S_{1} is followed by a unique stimulus, S_{2}, the response amplitudes should not be attenuated as a fresh sub-population of neurons is excited. Using this technique can allow researchers to determine if the same or unique neuronal groups are involved in processing two stimuli.

== Usage ==
This technique has been used successfully in examination of the visual system, particularly orientation, motion, and face recognition.

== See also ==
- Adaptive system
- Functional magnetic resonance imaging
- Neural adaptation
