= George M. Stratton =

American psychologist

- Born: George Malcolm Stratton; September 26, 1865; Oakland, California
- Died: October 8, 1957 (aged 92)
- Education: University of California
- Known for: Perception of binocular vision; Founding the Berkeley psychology department; Social psychology
- Scientific career
- Fields: Psychology; Philosophy
- Workplaces: University of California, Berkeley; Johns Hopkins University
- Doctoral advisor: Wilhelm Wundt
- Other academic advisors: George Howison
- Notable students: Knight Dunlap; Olga Bridgman

George Malcolm Stratton (September 26, 1865 – October 8, 1957) was an American psychologist who pioneered the study of perception in vision by wearing special glasses which inverted images up and down and left and right. He studied under one of the founders of modern psychology, Wilhelm Wundt, and started one of the first experimental psychology labs in America, at the University of California, Berkeley. Stratton's studies on binocular vision inspired many later studies on the subject. He was one of the initial members of the philosophy department at Berkeley, and the first chair of its psychology department. He also worked on sociology, focusing on international relations and peace. Stratton presided over the American Psychological Association in 1908, and was a member of the National Academy of Sciences. He wrote a book on experimental psychology and its methods and scope; published articles on the studies at his labs on perception, and on reviews of studies in the field; served on several psychological committees during and after World War I; and served as advisor to doctoral students who would go on to head psychology departments.

Stratton was born and brought up in the Oakland area of California, in a family with deep roots in America, and spent much of his career at Berkeley. He received his undergraduate degree from the University of California, an M.A. from Yale University, and a PhD from the University of Leipzig. He returned to the philosophy department at Berkeley, teaching psychology, and was promoted to associate professor. Stratton left for Johns Hopkins University in the early 1900s and spent a few years as faculty at the psychology department before returning to Berkeley. During this period, he focused on studies on sensation and perception and the psychological effects of inverting sensory stimuli in different ways. He was involved in establishing some of the early regional associations devoted to the field of psychology.

Stratton served in the Army during World War I, developing psychological tests to select airmen for Army aviation. Exposure to the war effort prompted his interest in international relations and causes of wars. He was an anti-war believer who held psychology should aim to assist humanity's quest to avert future wars. He was optimistic that people and ethnicities, making up nations, could be taught to live in peace, though the races were not equal in inborn mental capacity, a belief he held as scientific. In the later part of his career he wrote books looking at international relations, war, and the differences between races on emotions. He was also a scholar of the classics and translated Greek philosophers.

Of Stratton's many contributions, his studies on perception and visual illusions would continue to influence the field of psychology well after his death. Of the nine books he wrote, the first was a scholarly look at the methodology and scope of experimental psychology. The remaining, including one unfinished at his death, were on sociology, international relations and the issues of war and how findings from psychology could be used to eradicate conflict between nations. Stratton considered these issues more salient to the application of psychology in the real world, though his ideas on this front did not produce a lasting impact in the field because of their subjective and non-experimental nature.

== Early life and education ==
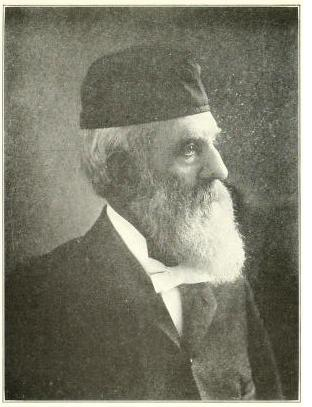
James Stratton

George Stratton was born on September 26, 1865, to James Thompson Stratton, originally from Ossining, New York, and Cornelia A. Smith. His parents had met and married in New York in 1854, and settled back in Clinton, now East Oakland, California. James Stratton had been to California once before during the gold rush of 1850, sailing around North America and crossing by land the Panama stretch, but finding little gold. The senior Stratton traced his ancestry to the early settlers of the British settlements of America, and Cornelia Smith had Dutch and English forebears. James Stratton would live the rest of his life in California, pursuing a civil engineering career as County Surveyor for Alameda County in 1858–59 and later as the U.S. Surveyor-General of the state, and finally as Chief Deputy State Surveyor. An expert on the big Mexican land grants, he split up several of the Spanish deeds. One of his sons, Frederick, went to the University of California, today's Berkeley, and became a lawyer, state senator, and Collector of the Port of San Francisco, before killing himself on November 30, 1915. Another, Robert Thomas, became a doctor in Oakland and died after a long illness on May 6, 1924. The couple also had a daughter, Jeanne, the later Mrs. Walter Good. George was their youngest child who lived past toddlerhood.

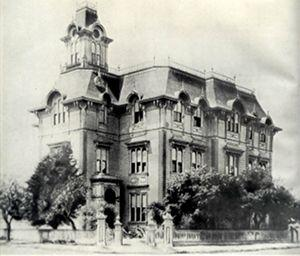
Oakland High 1872–95

Stratton's early education was at the Oakland public schools and undergraduate education at the University of California. At the university he was a member of the Beta Theta Pi fraternity. He was also the editor of the student news publication, The Berkeleyan, in 1886. Stratton graduated in 1888 with an A.B. degree from the University of California, in a total graduating class of 34 students. He learned Latin and English and taught in Buenaventura High School in 1888–89, and was its principal in 1889–90. At the school he met and courted San Francisco-born Alice Elenore Miller.

Stratton then obtained an A.M. degree from Yale in 1890. He was a fellow in the philosophy department at Berkeley from 1891 to 1893. The chair of the philosophy department, George Holmes Howison, whom he met as an undergraduate, would become a significant influence on his life. He taught two philosophy courses, both with Howison. On March 14, 1893, he was appointed an instructor in the department of philosophy. As an instructor, he began teaching psychology and logic courses, in addition to a philosophy course.

Howison obtained a fellowship from the University of California for his protege to study at the University of Leipzig. On May 17, 1894, Stratton married Alice Miller at the Methodist Episcopal Church in Berkeley, while being an instructor in the philosophy department. Immediately after, the couple left for the East on their way to Europe, with Stratton taking a leave of absence from Berkeley. He then spent two years at Wundt's Institute for Experimental Psychology at Leipzig, from where he received an M.A. and a PhD in 1896. He received his degree summa cum laude, with a thesis submitted to Wundt's publication, Philosophische Studien.

== Work years ==
Stratton spent his working years primarily at Berkeley. He founded the department of psychology at the university. He left once for Johns Hopkins and once to join the Army during World War I, serving in San Francisco, San Diego and New York.

=== Early Berkeley ===
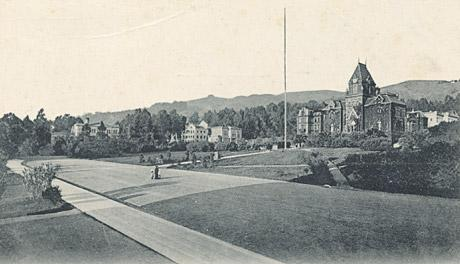
University of California (at Berkeley), c. 1898

Returning to America in 1896, Stratton rejoined the University of California as an instructor. (Note: Stratton's salary reflected the progress of his career. He started at $600 annually as an instructor at the University of California, but his salary was doubled two months later (Annual Report of the Secretary to the Board of Regents of the University of California, for the Year Ending June 30, 1893 1893, p. 74). The fellowship Howison got for Stratton to study at Leipzig was worth half Stratton's pay, $600, annually (Annual Report of the Secretary to the Board of Regents of the University of California, for the Year Ending June 30, 1894 1894, p. 18; Annual Report of the Secretary to the Board of Regents of the University of California, for the Year Ending June 30, 1895 1895, p. 40). When he rejoined the University of California after his leave of absence at Leipzig, he had a shared distinction of being the highest-paid instructor in the University (Annual Report of the Secretary to the Board of Regents of the University of California, for the Year Ending June 30, 1896 1896, p. 114).) In 1897 he was promoted to assistant professor. By 1898 he no longer taught philosophy but several psychology courses. (Note: Stratton's courses at the University of California were among the first psychology courses in the nation. Joining as a fellow, he taught two courses, both with Howison: "Propadeutic to philosophy", one term a year, four hours a week, with the number of students attending for the three years being 44, 49 and 48 respectively; and the four-unit one-term "Introduction to philosophy" with attendance of 33, 31 and 35 students (Biennial Report of the President of the University of California (1893) 1894, p. 22). After joining the faculty as an instructor, Stratton taught three courses, all one-term and four-hours-a-week, with Howison and others: "Formal logic" with 47 students; :"Elementary psychology" with 46 students; and "Introduction to philosophy" with 34 students (Biennial Report of the President of the University of California (1894) 1895, p. 16). By 1898 after rejoining Berkeley with a Ph.D. he taught only psychology courses, all one semester: "Formal logic" (with others), "Elementary psychology" (with others), "General psychology", "Introductory experimental psychology" and a "Psychological conference". Elementary and advanced psychological lab courses were planned but not offered (Biennial Report of the President of the University of California (1896–98) 1898, p. 95).) Two years later, he would influence the Philosophical Union into dedicating a year to investigating contemporary psychology. He himself presented a well-attended lecture series at the Union, with lively debates at the end, on psychological experiments. Over this time he also published three papers on his study with inverting lenses and how people adapt over time to such a view of the world: "Upright vision and the retinal image", "Vision without inversion of the retinal image", and "A mirror pseudoscope and the limit of visible depth", all in Psychological Review. He also presented a report of experiments with inverted vision to the Science Association of the university.

Stratton also became a member of the APA. One of Stratton's psychology students in the Philosophy department was Knight Dunlap, a later chair at Johns Hopkins and University of California, Los Angeles. Stratton became a director of the newly established psychology lab, in the philosophy department, in 1899. By 1900 he was an associate professor in the philosophy department, then headed by Howison. He contributed a paper to the Festschrift honoring Wundt's seventieth birthday in 1902: "Eye movements and the aesthetics of the visual form". He also taught a series of twenty lectures on philosophy and psychology at the Pacific Theological Seminary in Berkeley. His first daughter, Elenore, was born in 1900, and son James Malcolm around 1903.

=== Johns Hopkins and return to Berkeley ===
Stratton left Berkeley at end of June, 1904, and moved east to Johns Hopkins University as a professor of experimental psychology in October. At this time, philosophers and psychologists at Baltimore formed the Southern Society for Philosophy and Psychology (SSFY) and Stratton was one of the first 36 charter members. At its first meeting, he presented results of an experiment on fidelity of the senses.

While Stratton was at Johns Hopkins, the San Francisco Earthquake of 1906 struck destroying large swaths of the city. He had specific suggestions on how to rebuild the city to resist earthquakes and fires even with the water supply cut off. He urged the city be split into districts with avenues or boulevards as firebreaks between the divisions.

Stratton's second daughter, Florence, was born in Baltimore on May 24, 1907. He left Johns Hopkins in October 1909, and was replaced there as professor of experimental psychology by John Broadus Watson.

=== The US Army ===
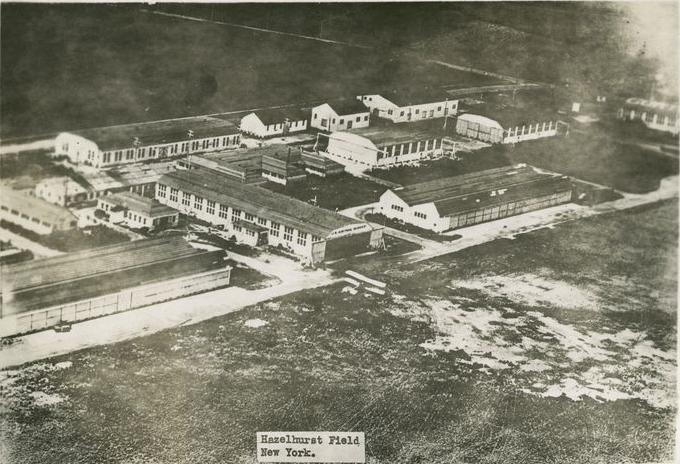
Hazelhurst field

During World War I, Stratton served in army aviation developing psychological recruitment tests for aviators. He worked at San Francisco, Rockwell Field, San Diego, and at Hazelhurst Field, Mineola, New York. Joining as a captain, he was promoted to major in 1918 along with a transfer to Mineola. Stratton presided over the Army Aviation Examining Board in San Francisco in 1917, chaired the subcommittee of the National Research Council of the APA: "Psychological Problems of Aviation, including Examination of Aviation Recruits" in the summer of 1917, and headed the psychological section of the Medical Research Lab of the Army Medical Research Board at Hazelhurst Field, a wing of the Army's Sanitary Corps, in 1918. As a member of the psychological division, his research focused on developing psychological recruiting tests for would-be aviators. The tests he designed tested for reaction times, ability to imagine completions of curves presented visually, and the ability to sense a gradual tilting of one's own body. Edward L. Thorndike pooled Stratton's results with other studies to statistically analyze and correlate weak performance to a poor flying record. Part of this research was carried out in the spring of 1918 with Captain Henmon at Kelly Field, and the army thought enough of the results to allow the tests for checking recruits in four new units.

=== Berkeley again ===
After the war, Stratton returned to Berkeley in January 1919. Stratton also taught at Berkeley's extension school, lecturing on "Psychology and health" in San Francisco to people from the medical profession in 1918–19, and in Oakland in 1919–20. By this time the introductory course on psychology was so in demand among the students, it was split into two, with Stratton and Warner Brown teaching it concurrently. His wife was the editor of the Semicentenary of the University of California, a volume issued by the University Press at Berkeley in 1920.

In 1921 his daughter, Elenore Stratton, graduated from Berkeley. That August she married Harvard graduate Edward Russell Dewey of New York at her father's house, and moved to the city, where she had done social settlement work following graduation. The same year his son attended Berkeley. The Berkeley department of psychology officially split from the department of philosophy, with Stratton as its first chair, on July 1, 1922. His second daughter, Florence, graduated from Berkeley with a B.A. in 1929.

=== Retirement and death ===
Stratton retired in 1935, but remained at the university, and died on October 8, 1957, at the age of 92, a year after his wife's death. He kept coming to the university until just before the end. When he died he was working on a book, The Divisive and Unifying Forces of the Community of Nations, though his eyesight was by then poor. During his retirement, he had lectured at universities across America, Europe and Asia. He was survived by his son, Malcolm Stratton, a physician at Berkeley; two daughters: Elenore, divorced and then married to Robert Fliess of New York, and Florence, married to Albert R. Reinke of Berkeley; nine grandchildren and one great-grandchild.

== Personal life ==
Stratton had several hobbies, brick-laying the most important one. He built the brick walls and paths in the garden of his house, a house he himself helped design. His daughter, Elenore, would recall decades later living in the house, with a view of the San Francisco bay and the Golden Gate on one side and the Marin county hills beyond. Annual camping in summer in the Sierras was another pastime, and he carried his love of books over there as well, writing in the shade of a tree in the mornings. Elenore also recalled his night-time reading of Homer to his children, mixing with fascinating guests for weekend suppers prepared by her mother, and the family camping out with Latin professor "Uncle" Leon Richardson.

== Work ==
Stratton began his career working in a philosophy department, teaching philosophy courses, but branched into experimentation soon after. He tackled problems of sociology and international relations later in his career.

=== Wundt's lab and the inverted-glasses experiments ===
Modern version of inverting mirrors with harness

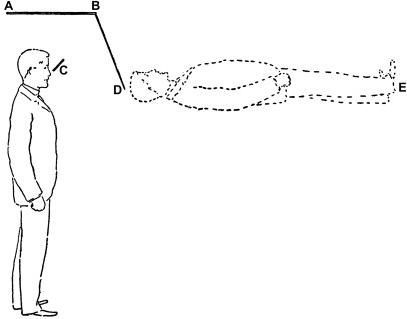
Mirror AB and mirror C are fixed via a harness. User hence sees an inverted version of own body in mirror C, approximately at location DE

Stratton went on to become a first-generation experimentalist in psychology. Wundt's lab in Leipzig, with experimental programs bringing together the fields of evolutionary biology, sensory physiology and nervous-system studies, was a part of the career of most of the first generation. It was the exposure there, added to the graduate work at Yale, that influenced Stratton into becoming a psychologist. It was there that he started his binocular vision experiments as well. In these experiments, he found himself adapting to the new perception of the environment over a few days, after inverting the images his eyes saw on a regular basis. For this, he wore a set of upside down goggles, glasses inverting images both upside-down and left-right. Stratton wore these glasses over his right eye and covered the left with a patch during the day, and slept blindfolded at night. Initial movement was clumsy, but adjusting to the new environment took only a few days.

Stratton tried variations of the experiment over the next few years. First he wore the glasses for eight days, back at Berkeley. The first day he was nauseated and the inverted landscape felt unreal, but by the second day just his own body position seemed strange, and by day seven, things felt normal. A sense of strangeness returned when the glasses were taken out, though the world looked straight side up; he found himself reaching out with the right hand when he should have used the left, and the other way around. Then he tried the experiment outdoors. He also tried another experiment disrupting the mental link between touch and sight. There he wore a set of mirrors attached to a harness as shown in the figure allowing, and forcing, him to see his body from above. He found the senses adapted in a similar way over three days. His interpretation was that we build up an association between sight and touch by associational learning over a period of time. During certain periods, the disconnect between vision and touch made him feel as if his body was not where his touch and proprioceptive feeling told him it was. This out-of-body experience, caused by an altered but normal sensory perception, vanished when he attended to the issue critically, focusing on the disconnect.

=== Berkeley psychology department ===
Back at Berkeley from Johns Hopkins, Stratton stayed in the philosophy department as its second faculty member and first psychology specialist until the psychology department broke off in 1922. The new department started with four people: Stratton as chair; Edward Chace Tolman, with a Harvard degree, and an initiator of rodent experiments soiling the rooms of the philosophy department and hastening the split of the psychology division; Brown, Stratton's earlier student and Berkeley faculty member from 1908 onward; and Olga Bridgman, the first Berkeley psychology PhD awardee, albeit from the philosophy department. Before the split Stratton had set up Berkeley's first psychology lab in the philosophy department and taught psychology courses with Brown. The courses included sensation, perception, emotion, memory, and applications of psychology to professions such as law, medicine, schooling and clerical work by priests.

Stratton continued his experiments on perception, branching into studies on pseudoscopic vision, stereoscopic acuity, eye movements, symmetry and visual illusions, how people perceive depth seeing surroundings either one-eyed or two-eyed, acuity and limits of peripheral vision, apparent motion, afterimages impressed on the eye when a person stares at an object for long and then looks away, and problems with sight in half the visual field (hemianopsia). He both reviewed earlier studies on motion and conducted two of his own, concluding perceiving movement was more than the sum of seeing successive sequential images. He also surveyed and reported in reviews in the Psychological Bulletin experiments at various labs, including those in Europe, on matters related to sensation and perception.

List of Stratton's special lectures while at Berkeley
- Philosophical Union: "The import of psychological experiments" (series), 1899–1900
- Phi Beta Kappa annual address: "The fighting instinct", May 11, 1909
- Philosophical Union: "The philosophy and the world of ideals: Aesthetics", April 1, 1910
- Philosophical Union: "The psychology of mysticism", February 25, 1916
- Carnegie Endowment for International Peace Lectures: "The psychology of the war spirit" series, 1915 UC summer session
  - June 21: "The external occasions of fighting"
  - June 23: "The inner sources of combativeness"
  - June 25: "The psychic condition of hostility"
  - July 2: "Fighting among savages"
  - July 7: "Psychology of the war spirit: Significant changes among leading people"
  - July 9: "Psychology of the war spirit: The present quality of warfare"
  - July 12: "Warfare and the great interests: Commerce and science"
  - July 14: "Warfare and the great interests: Morality"
  - July 16: "Warfare and the great interests"
  - July 19, 21, 23, 26, 28, 30: "Methods of control in war"
- Yale Divinity School, New Haven: "Anger in morals and religion" (series of 4), May 1920
- Philosophical Union: 1921
  - Jan 28: "Being mutually angry"
  - Feb 11: "Experiments on the mind: Their character and value"
  - Feb 18: "The subconscious and its importance"
  - Feb 25: "The training of the will"
  - Mar 4: "Where has psychology left religion"
  - Mar 11: "The teachings of morals and religion"
- International Relations Lectures: "The orient and the armament conference", November 4, 1921

=== Philosophical and educational psychology and sociology ===
Stratton was exposed to multiple influences through his life. As an undergraduate student of Howison, he learned about philosophy and religion. At Yale and later at Wundt's lab, he switched to experimental psychology and studied perception, memory and emotion. His exposure to World War I, serving in the Army then, focused his mind on issues of war and peace and international relations. Stratton's later work reflected these elements of his experience. He was also a scholar of the classics and translated some Greek philosophers.

Stratton saw humans not as machines to be analyzed mechanistically, but also as seating will, emotion and drives, all of which had to analyzed as scientifically as the traditional psychological concepts of sensation, perception and memory. He also believed in a supreme actuality behind the world registered by our senses. This was the theme of his last published book, Man-Creator or Destroyer, completed in 1952 when he was eighty-seven years old. His book Developing Mental Power was a foray into educational psychology, addressing the question of general versus specific training in terms teachers could understand and use. Stratton aimed at this goal via a simple and generally applicable look at the basic workings of mental life. John F. Dashiell, writing in the Journal of Abnormal Psychology, found this a failure. Dashiell saw the path from the psychological concepts—emotion, intelligence, and will—to teaching methodology, not clearly described in the book. Stratton also applied psychological concepts to figure out how to avert war. He was optimistic it was possible to harness the creative and destructive facets of individuals to get nations to coexist peacefully. He saw nations as consisting of ethnicities and races which had to coexist in harmony. In line with the prevailing view in his field, he did not see the races as inherently equally intelligent.

=== Psychology of religion and emotions ===
Stratton also contributed to the psychological study of religion. Along with other founders of the psychology of religion, he saw religion as including both personal faith and historical traditions. He used religious texts as supporting data. In The Psychology of the Religious Life he explored the epics and sacred texts of a large set of ethnicities to understand the traditions and rituals symbolizing the concrete parts of faiths to understand the goals and concept of religion as a whole. His psychology sought to explain how our need to grasp, accept and live with conceptual opposites such as the sublime and the devilish, the humble and the proud, and the docile and the energetic, led us in the direction of religion. He also tied human emotions, especially anger and pugnacity, to religious faith. To understand the linkage, Stratton collected data on religious writings and the rites and traditions of civilizations then considered not as advanced. In Anger: Its Religious and Moral Significance he listed exhaustively and studied the major religions of the world and classified them into three categories. The combative religions, such as Islam, per him, glorified anger, while those such as Buddhism were "unangry". Christianity he saw as an example of an anger-supported-love–based religion. He concluded Western civilization was trending toward denying rage as good and accepting love and goodwill as desirable, but cautioned anger was at times needed to fight evil.

As a professor at Berkeley, Stratton visited Philippines, China, Japan, and Hawaii, coordinating with the University of the Philippines to study the psychology of both races and oriental religions. He also explored anger and emotions in animals. He was one of the scientists who were invited to attend, and confirmed attendance, at a conference to discuss human emotions and feelings. The conference, scheduled for October 21–23, 1927, at Wittenberg College was to focus on the experimental psychology of religion.

Stratton articulated his own beliefs about religion as well. He did not subscribe to the view religious feeling was primarily a social need, believing it to be a need for seeing a cause and logic to the world along with a harmony to things. A believer in dualism, he held the theory of a separate biological psyche and something beyond it. To him the most important aspects of the psyche lay beyond objective science, at least in his time. He sought to explore those boundaries where the methods of science had to stop and declare what was beyond as unknown, limited by the tools of the times. In The Psychology of the Religious Life he laid out his definition of religion as an appreciative feeling toward an unseen entity marked the best or the greatest.

Stratton suggested music had healing powers. In an address on the "Nature and training of the emotions" delivered to a group of nurses at the Baltimore hospitals, he predicted music would be used to treat the sick in the future, and held that nurses had to know how to sing to patients under their care.

== Books ==
Stratton wrote eight books, and contributed to collections honoring his mentors, writing an obituary on Wundt and a biography of Howison. His PhD thesis, Über die Wahrnehmung von Druckänderungen bei verschiedenen Geschwindigkeiten, was in German and published in Leipzig in Wundt's Philosophische Studien, XII Band, IV Heft. His first book. Experimental Psychology and its Bearing upon Culture covered the scope and practice of experimental psychology, and later books turned more toward sociology and international relations.

=== Experimental Psychology and its Bearing upon Culture ===
Stratton wrote Experimental Psychology and its Bearing upon Culture to explain both typical psychological experiment methodology and how the results obtained answered philosophical problems. The book covered experimental results in psychology and how they influenced overall social behavior and the everyday cultural life of people. It did so by looking at the history of experimental psychology, and then surveying experimental methods covering both their applications and limits. Stratton pointed out how psychological experiments differed from the ones in physiology. The survey of experiments also included studies on mental perception, including among the blind. Stratton noted that the blind did have a sense of space. He also described how measurements of mental phenomena were both possible and being done in practice, though he did believe the results had to be interpreted on a psychic scale different from the usual physical ones used for measures such as lengths and weights. He rejected the argument the mind was unitary and could not be studied by splitting it into parts, by drawing on the analogy of studying a tree by looking at its constituent parts, themselves not functionally trees. He presumed sensations were akin to trees in how they could be split up into parts.

The book had chapters on memory, imitation and suggestion, perceptual illusions, and esthetics. In these he refuted the idea that experience was just the external environment acting on and molding a mind working as a passive recipient. Stratton saw the sensation of time as being multidimensional, in analogy with perception of space. That we could simultaneously hear separately, without synthesizing, multiple mixed tones meant our experiences did not necessarily come in single file temporally. To Stratton this meant time had multiple dimensions, since simultaneous events could not be distinguished on the one past-present-future dimension of time alone. He did not address how the other dimensions could be in temporal-space if the events were indistinguishable temporally to begin with. He also analyzed poetic measure as mathematically connected to the waxing and waning span of attention, tying the arts to psychology. This last was rebutted by Charles Samuel Myers, writing in Nature, who saw poetry and its rhythm as too complex a subject to be reduced to the arithmetic of attention spans.

In later chapters, Stratton covered the topics of the unconscious mind, the mind–body connection, and spiritual aspects of psychology. He attacked the standard dualist view of a separate homuncular entity driving the biology of mental processes. Still he concluded, from observations that people were not always aware of how their own perception differed from sensory reality, that a diluted form of the dualist theory was tenable. In his final chapter, the author posited experimental psychology neither needed nor ruled out the idea of a soul. Myers critiqued the book's treatment of illusions, memory, and relationship of psychology to body and soul, as not addressing the broader aspect of "culture". Myers saw the work as appealing more to the educated reader than the specialist, the many deviations from experimental topics into subjective arenas a distraction.

=== Social Psychology for International Conduct ===
Stratton wrote Social Psychology for International Conduct for social science teachers who wanted to use psychology to analyze international affairs. The book's first part evaluated races. Stratton concluded the Caucasoid and Mongoloid races were innately more intelligent enabling them to build strong cultures. He also stated the prejudice of other people was from the social and political advantages it brought. Stratton saw nations as made up of individuals and possessing a national character similar to what individuals had. Reviewing the book in the American Journal of Sociology, Ellsworth Faris objected to the author concluding the Northern and Central Europeans were more intelligent than Southern and Eastern Europeans, noting intelligence measures correlated also with length of stay in America.

In the chapter on "Taking national profits out of war" the author hypothesized nations often went to war because it paid, bringing both national rewards and helping achieve policy goals. He suggested nations be blocked from enjoying any fruits of war, and instead be penalized for waging it. In a review in the Political Science Quarterly, Walter Sandelius concluded enforcing such a position meant an international enforcement force with judicial and police powers, the formation of which would need an appeal to both reason and desire on the part of the international community. Sandelius also saw Stratton as pushing more for re-educating the mind rather than training people to control emotions and passions in the efforts to avert war.

=== What Starts Wars: Intentional Delusions ===
In What Starts Wars: Intentional Delusions Stratton presented nations, themselves collections of people, as triggering war from several delusions. Three of those delusions held by citizens were that their own country was a paragon of peace, that its arms were only to defend the land, and that when it fought, it fought only for what was right. Blaming the enemy rounded out this list justifying war. Stratton believed and stated people could be freed of these delusions and that there was no will to war integral to human nature. He saw both the need for and the ways to eliminate war in individuals and in their ways, and not in abstract or innate traits. Florence Finch Kelly, reviewing the book for the New York Times, saw Stratton's placing of both the blame and the responsibility on persons, of identifying the roots of war in the psyches of the men and women his readers, as an action likely to discomfit those readers.

== Legacy ==
Stratton became a member of the National Academy of Sciences in 1928, president of the American Psychological Association in 1908, chair of its division on anthropology and psychology in 1925–1926, was a member of its National Research Council, an honorary member of the National Institute of Psychology, and a corresponding member of the American Institute of Czechoslovakia. He published eight full-length books, and 125 papers. He was an honorary lecturer at Yale, delivering the Nathaniel W. Taylor Lectures at the Yale School of Religion beginning April 19, 1920.

Stratton's earlier work on sensation and perception and the book based on them stayed influential among researchers in psychology. Many of his other books and articles which dealt with philosophical and sociological issues either beyond, or treated via perspectives beyond, exact and objective investigation had lost appeal to psychology researchers by the time of his death.

Of the various fields Stratton studied, it is his experimentation in binocular vision and perception that has had the most impact. Whether during the inversion experiment people really see an upside-down world as being normal, or whether they adapt to it only behaviorally, has been debated for a long time. Neuroimaging studies done a century after the original experiment have shown no difference in early levels of visual processing, which indicates the perceptual world stays inverted at that level of cognition. The research has been put to use in both practical and esthetic ways. The mirror-experiment experience of disconnect between vision and feeling has parallels in, and applications for researching, phantom limb syndrome. The art exhibit Upside-down Mushroom Room by Belgian artist Carsten Höller, a tunnel installation with an inverted environment, builds on Stratton's work.

Stratton provided encouragement to both his students and his children. Early at Berkeley, he encouraged young students to pursue graduate study in psychology, writing personal letters to students who scored an A grade in his introductory psychology course. The stamp of Stratton's legacy can be seen in his doctoral students. Knight Dunlap was one of his earliest students at Berkeley and he became the twenty-second president of the American Psychological Association. Dunlap was one of those who saw Stratton as a guide and mentor. Another of his early students, Warner Brown, would be the chair of the psychology department at Berkeley for sixteen years. A third, Olga Bridgman, would serve on the faculty at University of California—Berkeley and San Francisco—for over forty years.

== Committees ==
- Standing Committees of the Academic Council for Scholarships, University of California, 1902–1903
- Standing Committees of the Graduate Council: University of California, 1902–1903
- One of the first group of members of the Southern Society for Philosophy and Psychology (SSFY), 1904
- President of the American Psychological Association, 1908
- Committee of Arrangements for Administering the Beale Prizes instituted by Regent Truxtun Beale, 1911
- Chair of Board of Research, University of California, 1920–1921
- Chair of the University of California Meeting, October 7, 1921
- Standing Committee of the Academic Senate, Administrative Committee on International Relations, 1921–1922
- Elected member of the National Academy of Sciences, 1928. Stratton served in various capacities with the NAS:
  - Member of the National Research Council, 1925–1926
  - Chair of Division of Anthropology and Psychology, National Research Council, 1926
  - Member of the Board for administering the Rockefeller Foundation fellowships in the biological sciences, 19245–1926
  - Representative on Editorial board of PNAS, 1926
  - Advisory board of the Bureau of Public Personnel Administration of the Institute for Government Research, 1926
  - Committee on Tactual Interpretation of Oral Speech and Vocal control by the Deaf, 1926
  - Committee on National fellowships in Child Development, 1927

== List of books ==
- Myers, C. S (1903). "Experimental Psychology and its Bearing upon Culture". Nature. 68 (1768): 331. Bibcode:1903Natur..68..465M. doi:10.1038/068465a0.
- Psychology of the Religious Life. New York, New York: Macmillan. 1911. p. 376.
- Double Standard with Regard to Fighting. New York, New York: American Association for International Conciliation. 1912. p. 14.
- Control of the Fighting Instinct. New York, New York: American Association for International Conciliation. 1913. p. 13.
- Theophrastus and the Greek Physiological Psychology before Aristotle. New York, New York: Macmillan; London, Allen and Unwin. 1917. pp. 227.
- Developing Mental Power. Boston, MA: Houghton. 1922. pp. 77.
- Anger: Its Religious and Moral Significance. New York, New York: Macmillan. 1923. pp. 277.
- Social Psychology of International Conduct. New York, New York: D. Appleton and Company. 1929. p. 387.
- What Starts Wars: International Delusions. New York, New York: Houghton Mifflin company. 1936. p. 221.
- Man, Creator or Destroyer. London: Allen and Unwin. 1952. p. 170.

== See also ==
- Neural adaptation
- Peace movement

== Bibliography ==
Books

- Annual Report of the Secretary to the Board of Regents of the University of California, for the Year Ending June 30, 1893. Sacramento, CA: State Office, A. J. Johnston Supt. State Printing. 1893. (Note: The URL points to a Google book which bundles reports from multiple years. Cited page numbers are from the individual reports, not of the combined book. Simplest way to get to the source is to search for "Stratton" inside the bundled book.)
- Annual Report of the Secretary to the Board of Regents of the University of California, for the Year Ending June 30, 1894. 1894.
- Annual Report of the Secretary to the Board of Regents of the University of California, for the Year Ending June 30, 1895. 1895.
- Annual Report of the Secretary to the Board of Regents of the University of California, for the Year Ending June 30, 1896. Sacramento, CA: State Office, A. J. Johnston Supt. State Printing. 1896.
- Biennial Report of the President of the University of California, 1893. Sacramento, CA: A. J. Johnston Supt. State Printing. 1894.
- Biennial Report of the President of the University of California, 1894. 1895.
- Biennial Report of the President of the University of California, 1894–96. Sacramento, CA: A. J. Johnston Supt. State Printing. 1896.
- Biennial Report of the President of the University of California, 1896–98. Berkeley, CA: University Press. 1898.
- Biennial Report of the President of the University of California, 1898–1900. 1900.
- Biennial Report of the President of the University of California, 1900–1902. Berkeley, CA: University Press. 1902.
- Biennial Report of the President of the University of California, 1902–1904. 1904.
- Biennial Report of the President of the University of California, 1904–1906. 1906.
- Biennial Report of the President of the University of California, 1910–12. Berkeley, CA: University Press. 1912.
- Brown, C.W.; Bridgman, O.L.; Jarrett, R.F.; Tolman, E.C. (1959). "George Malcolm Stratton, Psychology: Berkeley". University of California: In Memoriam, 1959. University of California Libraries: Calisphere.
- The California Alumni Monthly, Volume XV. California Alumni Association, University of California. 1922.
- David A. Leeming; Kathryn Madden; Stanton Marlan, eds. (2010). Encyclopedia of Psychology and Religion Volume 2. New York, NY: Springer. ISBN 978-0-387-71801-9.
- Ginn, R.V.N. (1997). History of the US Army Medical Service Corps. Center of Military History. Archived from the original on 2012-06-25.
- James Sutton: A Tribute. Addresses Delivered at the James Sutton Memorial Meeting (March 3, 1929). University of California. 1929.
- Jones, W.C. (1895). Illuminated history of the University of California, 1868–95. San Francisco, CA : F.H. Dukesmith.
- Kemp, H.V. (2005). John R. Shook (ed.). Dictionary of Modern American Philosophy Volumes 1, 2, 3 and 4. Bristol, England: Thoemmes Continuum. ISBN 978-1843710370.
- Kim, A. (2006). Edward N. Zalta (ed.). Stanford Encyclopedia of Philosophy (Fall 2008 edition): Notes to Wilhelm Maximilian Wundt. Stanford University Department of Philosophy.
- Lawrence, R.M. (1910). Primitive Psychotherapy and Quackery: Chapter XVII, The healing power of music. Boston, MA: Houghton Mifflin, The Riverside Press (Cambridge).
- Macfarlane, J.W.; Gilhousen, M.C.; Lenzen, V.F. (1958). "Warner Brown, psychology: Berkeley: 1882–1956, professor emeritus". University of California: In Memoriam, April 1958. University of California Libraries, Calisphere.
- Meister, D. (1999). The History of Human Factors and Ergonomics. Mahwah, NJ: Lawrence Erlbaum. ISBN 978-0-8058-2769-9.
- Merleau-Ponty, M. (1962). Phenomenology of Perception. London, UK: Routledge. ISBN 9780415278416.
- Myers, D.G. (2010). Psychology. New York, NY: Worth. ISBN 978-1-4292-1597-8.
- Pendergrast, M. (2003). Mirror, Mirror: A History of the Human Love Affair with Reflection. New York, NY: Basic Books. ISBN 978-0786729906.
- Register 1902–1903 (Combined Google book). Berkeley, CA: University of California Press. 1903.
- Report of the National Academy of Sciences, Fiscal Year 1925–1926. Washington D.C.: U.S. Government Printing Office. 1927.
- Report of the National Academy of Sciences, Fiscal Year 1926–1927. Washington D.C.: U.S. Government Printing Office. 1928.
- Report of the National Academy of Sciences, Fiscal Year 1927–1928. Washington D.C.: U.S. Government Printing Office. 1929.
- Report of the President of the Johns Hopkins University, Baltimore, 1904. Johns Hopkins University. 1904.
- Report of the President of the Johns Hopkins University, Baltimore, 1908. Baltimore, MD: Johns Hopkins Press. 1909.
- Stadtman, V.A. (c. 1968). The Centennial Record of the University of California, 1868–1968. University of California.
- Stratton, G.M. (1929). Social Psychology for International Conduct. New York, NY: D Appleton.
- Stratton, H.R. (1918). A Book of Strattons Volume II. New York, NY: The Grafton Press.
- Strum, S.C.; Edigan, L.M., eds. (2007). Primate Encounters: Models of Science, Gender and Society. University of Chicago Press. ISBN 978-0-226-77755-9.
- Taylor, E.I.; Wozniak, R.H. (1996). Classics in the history of psychology: Pure experience, the response to William James: An introduction. Bristol Thoemmes Press. Archived from the original on 2012-10-15.
- Tolman, E.C. (1961). George Malcolm Stratton, 1865–1957: A Biographical Memoir (PDF). Washington D.C.: National Academy of Sciences.
- Tuddenham, R.D.; Macfarlane, J.W.; Simon, A. (1977). "Olga Louise Bridgman, psychology: San Francisco and Berkeley: 1886–974, professor emeritus". University of California: In Memoriam, May 1977. University of California Libraries, Calisphere.
- University of California: Catalogue of Officers and Students for 1921–22 (To February 21, 1922) PART XVI. Berkeley, CA: University of California Press. 1922.

Journals

- Aikins, H. A. (1904). "Reviews and abstracts of literature: Experimental Psychology and its Bearing upon Culture by George M. Stratton". The Journal of Philosophy, Psychology, and Scientific Methods. 1 (1): 23–25. doi:10.2307/2011992. hdl:2027/hvd.hw20ox. JSTOR 2011992.
- Ames, E.S. (1912). "Review of psychology of the religious life". Psychological Bulletin. 9 (12): 465–67. doi:10.1037/h0063830.
- Angell, J.R. (1904). "Review of Experimental Psychology and its Bearing upon Culture". Psychological Bulletin. 1 (1): 21–25. doi:10.1037/h0073622.
- Regents, California. University; Office Of The President, University of California (System) (1916). "Annual report of the President of the University of California, 1915–16". University of California Bulletin. 3. 10 (6).
- "Annual report of the President of the University of California, 1918–19". University of California Bulletin. 3. 13 (7). 1920.
- "Annual report of the President of the University of California, 1919–20". University of California Bulletin. 3. 14 (6). 1920.
- "Annual report of the President of the University of California, 1920–21". University of California Bulletin (Combined Google Books). 3. 14 (6). 1922.
- "Annual report of the President of the University of California, 1921–22". University of California Bulletin (Combined Google Books). 3. 16 (6). 1922.
- "The Beta Theta Pi". The Beta Theta Pi Magazine. 22 (3). January–February 1895. (Note: The URL points to a Google book which starts with a 78 page supplemental section, followed by the actual volume. Page numbers here exclude the initial 78 pages. A search does not work inside this book.)
- Office Of The President, University of California (System) (1911). "Biennial report of the President of the University of California, 1908–10". University of California Bulletin. 3. 4 (4).
- Bridgman, O. (1958). "George Malcolm Stratton: 1865-1957". The American Journal of Psychology. 7 (2): 460–61. JSTOR 1420108. PMID 13545428.
- Brown, C.W. (1958). "George Malcolm Stratton: Social Psychologist". Science. 127 (3312): 1432–33. Bibcode:1958Sci...127.1432B. doi:10.1126/science.127.3312.1432. PMID 13555901.
- Buchner, E.F. (1905). "Proceedings of the first annual meeting of the Southern Society for Philosophy and Psychology, Baltimore, MD., and Philadelphia, PA., December 27 and 28, 1904". Psychological Bulletin. 2 (2): 72–80. doi:10.1037/h0075642. Archived from the original on 2010-06-23.
- Dashiell, J.F. (1923). "Review of Developing Mental Power". Journal of Abnormal Psychology. 17 (4): 433. doi:10.1037/h0064127.
- Ellwood, C.A. (1925). "Review of Anger: Its religious and moral significance". Psychological Bulletin. 22 (11): 665–66. doi:10.1037/h0064571.
- Faris, E. (1930). "Review of Social Psychology of International Conduct by G.M. Stratton". American Journal of Sociology. 35 (5): 833. doi:10.1086/215200.
- Fliess, E. (1982). "Robert Fliess: A personality profile". American Imago. 39: 195–218.
- Goodspeed, T.H. (1923). "Activities of special committees: Psychological Investigations". Bulletin of the National Research Council. 5 (31).
- Leuba, J.H. (1912). "Book review:The Psychology of the Religious Life. George Malcolm Stratton". International Journal of Ethics. 23 (1): 137–39. doi:10.1086/206706. JSTOR 2377113.
- Meier, N.C. (1930). "Review of Social Psychology of International Conduct". Journal of Applied Psychology. 14 (5): 510–12. doi:10.1037/h0063883.
- Moore, K.G. (1949). "Knight Dunlap:1875–1949". Psychological Review. 46 (6): 309–10. doi:10.1037/h0061313.
- Myers, C.S. (1903). "The worth of experimental psychology". Nature. 68 (1768): 465. Bibcode:1903Natur..68..465M. doi:10.1038/068465a0.
- University Of California, Berkeley (1903). "Register 1902–1903". University of California Bulletin. 5 (1).
- Sandelius, W. (1931). "Reviews: The Evolution of War. by Maurice R. Davie; Social Psychology of International Conduct. By George Malcolm Stratton". Political Science Quarterly. 46 (1): 137–39. doi:10.2307/2143122. JSTOR 2143122.
- Michels, John (1919). "Scientific notes and news". Science. 50 (1301): 523. doi:10.1126/science.50.1301.522-a.
- Wade, N.J. (2000). "An upright man" (PDF). Perception. 29 (3): 253–57. doi:10.1068/p2903ed. PMID 10889936. S2CID 5156460. Archived from the original (PDF) on 2012-04-26.
- Wade, N.J. (2009). "Beyond body experiences: Phantom limbs, pain and the locus of sensation". Cortex. 45 (2): 243–55. doi:10.1016/j.cortex.2007.06.006. PMID 18621367. S2CID 13440761.
- Yerkes, R.M. (1919). "Report of the psychology committee of the National Research Council". Psychological Review. 26 (2): 97. doi:10.1037/h0070673. hdl:2027/mdp.39015039724847.

Newspapers and magazines

- "George M. Stratton, taught psychology". New York Times. October 10, 1957.
- "Give ideas for new city". San Francisco Chronicle. May 6, 1906.
- Kelly, F.F. (February 23, 1936). "Review: What starts wars". New York Times. p. BR26.
- Lord, M.G. (February 2006). "Reviews: Whatever the eyes see the brain turns bottoms up". Discover.
- "Obituary: James M. Stratton, Jr". Sierra Sun. January 6, 2010.
- "Title unknown". Oakland Tribune. May 6, 1924.
- "To study emotions of human beings: Psychologists will meet at Wittenberg College". New York Times. August 18, 1927. p. 20.

Web sources

- "APA presidential addresses". American Psychological Association. September 11, 2012.
- "Berkeley: Departments and programs: Psychology". University of California digital archives. June 18, 2004.
- "Biographical history: Frederick Smith Stratton (1858–1915)". The Social Network and Archival Context Project.
- "Biographical history: James T. Stratton". Bancroft Library: James T. Stratton Papers, 1857–1903.
- "Florence Stratton Reinke (1907–91)". AskArt Academic.
- Green, C.D. (August 2011). "Classics in the history of psychology: Institutions of early experimental psychology: Laboratories, courses, journals, and associations". Archived from the original on June 23, 2010.
- "Online Archive of California: The George Malcolm Stratton papers, 1911–56". University of California, Berkeley: Bancroft library. 2009.
- US Census Bureau (1940). "US Census, 1940: California: J Malcolm Stratton". United States National Archives and Records Administration. "Entry can be cross-checked more easily at the ancestry.com site"
