= Upside down goggles =

Eyewear that inverts the wearer's view

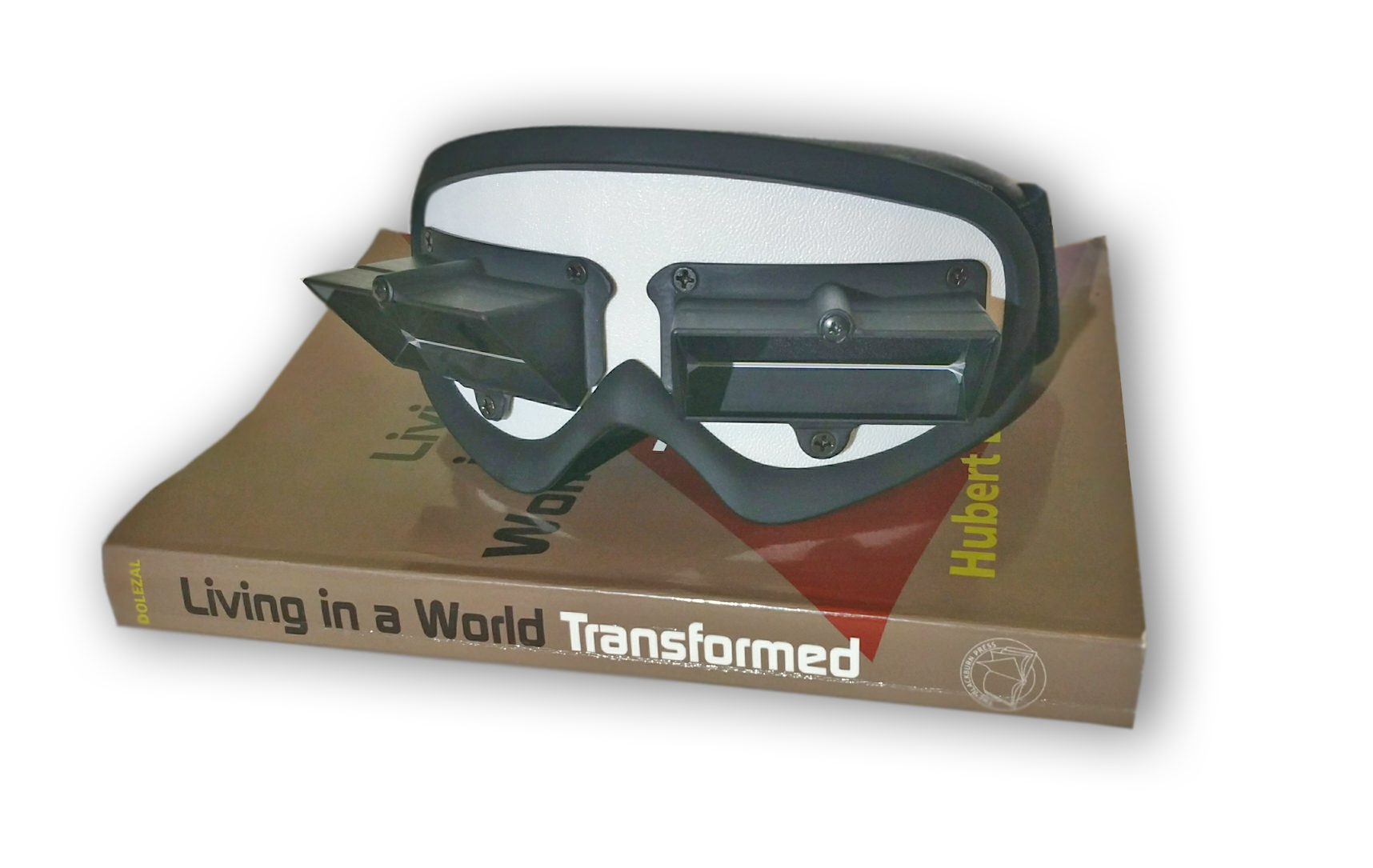
Modern wide angle upside down goggles (140° x 60° field of view)

Upside down goggles, also known as "invertoscopes" by Russian researchers, are optical instruments that invert the image received by the retinas upside down. They are used to study human visual perception, particularly psychological process of building a visual image in the brain. Objects viewed through such a device appear upside down and mirrored. They are constructed using sets of optical right-angle prisms, concave mirrors, or a mirror plus right-angle prisms with unequal cathethus.

== Purpose ==
Upside down goggles can be used to demonstrate human adaptation to inverted vision, and as a method of preventing motion sickness. Hubert Dolezal recommended using upside down goggles for "nausea adaptation" for space travel.

They can also be used to train spatial abilities and possibly cognitive functions. (Note: Patent RU2008802 "Training of spatial abilities of human")

== Effect ==
How a human looks blinking in upside down goggles

Under normal circumstances, an inverted image is formed on the retina of the eye. With the help of upside down goggles, the image on the retina of the observer's eyes is turned back (straightened) and thus the space around the observer looks upside down.

== History ==
George M. Stratton designed the first upside down goggles for a psychological experiment. His device used short-focus lenses. Stratton used a one-tube, monocular device because this also reverses left and right and he wished to set up an experiment without distortion of depth perception.

In 1931 Theodor Erismann and Ivo Kohler conducted a series of experiments using mirror-prismatic upside down goggles employing only one mirror.

After experimenting since 1984, in 1991 Hubert Dolezal procured a US patent for comfortable light weight upside down goggles. (Note: US Patent 5,042,910 "Prismatic image transposing optical system")

Modern upside down goggles consist of two prisms fixed onto a comfortable ski mask-like base.
