= Adaptive system =

System that can adapt to the environment

An adaptive system is a set of interacting or interdependent entities, real or abstract, forming an integrated whole that together are able to respond to environmental changes or changes in the interacting parts, in a way analogous to either continuous physiological homeostasis or evolutionary adaptation in biology. Feedback loops represent a key feature of adaptive systems, such as ecosystems and individual organisms; or in the human world, communities, organizations, and families. Adaptive systems can be organized into a hierarchy.

Artificial adaptive systems include robots with control systems that utilize negative feedback to maintain desired states.

== The law of adaptation ==
The law of adaptation may be stated informally as:

Every adaptive system converges to a state in which all kind of stimulation ceases.

Formally, the law can be defined as follows:

Given a system $S$, we say that a physical event $E$ is a stimulus for the system $S$ if and only if the probability $P(S \rightarrow S'|E)$ that the system suffers a change or be perturbed (in its elements or in its processes) when the event $E$ occurs is strictly greater than the prior probability that $S$ suffers a change independently of $E$:

$$P(S \rightarrow S'|E)>P(S \rightarrow S')$$

Let $S$ be an arbitrary system subject to changes in time $t$ and let $E$ be an arbitrary event that is a stimulus for the system $S$: we say that $S$ is an adaptive system if and only if when t tends to infinity $(t\rightarrow \infty)$ the probability that the system $S$ change its behavior $(S\rightarrow S')$ in a time step $t_0$ given the event $E$ is equal to the probability that the system change its behavior independently of the occurrence of the event $E$. In mathematical terms:

1. - $P_{t_0}(S\rightarrow S'|E) > P_{t_0}(S\rightarrow S') > 0$
2. - $\lim_{t\rightarrow \infty} P_t(S\rightarrow S' | E) = P_t(S\rightarrow S')$

Thus, for each instant $t$ will exist a temporal interval $h$ such that:

$$P_{t+h}(S\rightarrow S' | E) - P_{t+h}(S\rightarrow S') < P_t(S\rightarrow S' | E) - P_t(S\rightarrow S')$$

== Benefit of self-adjusting systems ==
In an adaptive system, a parameter changes slowly and has no preferred value. In a self-adjusting system though, the parameter value “depends on the history of the system dynamics”. One of the most important qualities of self-adjusting systems is its “adaptation to the edge of chaos” or ability to avoid chaos. Practically speaking, by heading to the edge of chaos without going further, a leader may act spontaneously yet without disaster. A March/April 2009 Complexity article further explains the self-adjusting systems used and the realistic implications. Physicists have shown that adaptation to the edge of chaos occurs in almost all systems with feedback.

== Practopoietic theory ==
According to practopoietic theory, creation of adaptive behavior involves special, poietic interactions among different levels of system organization. These interactions are described on the basis of cybernetic theory in particular, good regulator theorem. In practopoietic systems, lower levels of organization determine the properties of higher levels of organization, but not the other way around. This ensures that lower levels of organization (e.g., genes) always possess cybernetically more general knowledge than the higher levels of organization—knowledge at a higher level being a special case of the knowledge at the lower level. At the highest level of organization lies the overt behavior. Cognitive operations lay in the middle parts of that hierarchy, above genes and below behavior. For behavior to be adaptive, at least three adaptive traverses are needed.

== See also ==
- Autopoiesis
- Adaptive immune system
- Artificial neural network
- Complex adaptive system
- Diffusion of innovations
- Ecosystems
- Gaia hypothesis
- Gene expression programming
- Genetic algorithms
- Learning
- Neural adaptation
