= Johannes Gräff =

Swiss neuroscientist (born 1978)

Johannes Gräff Associate Professor
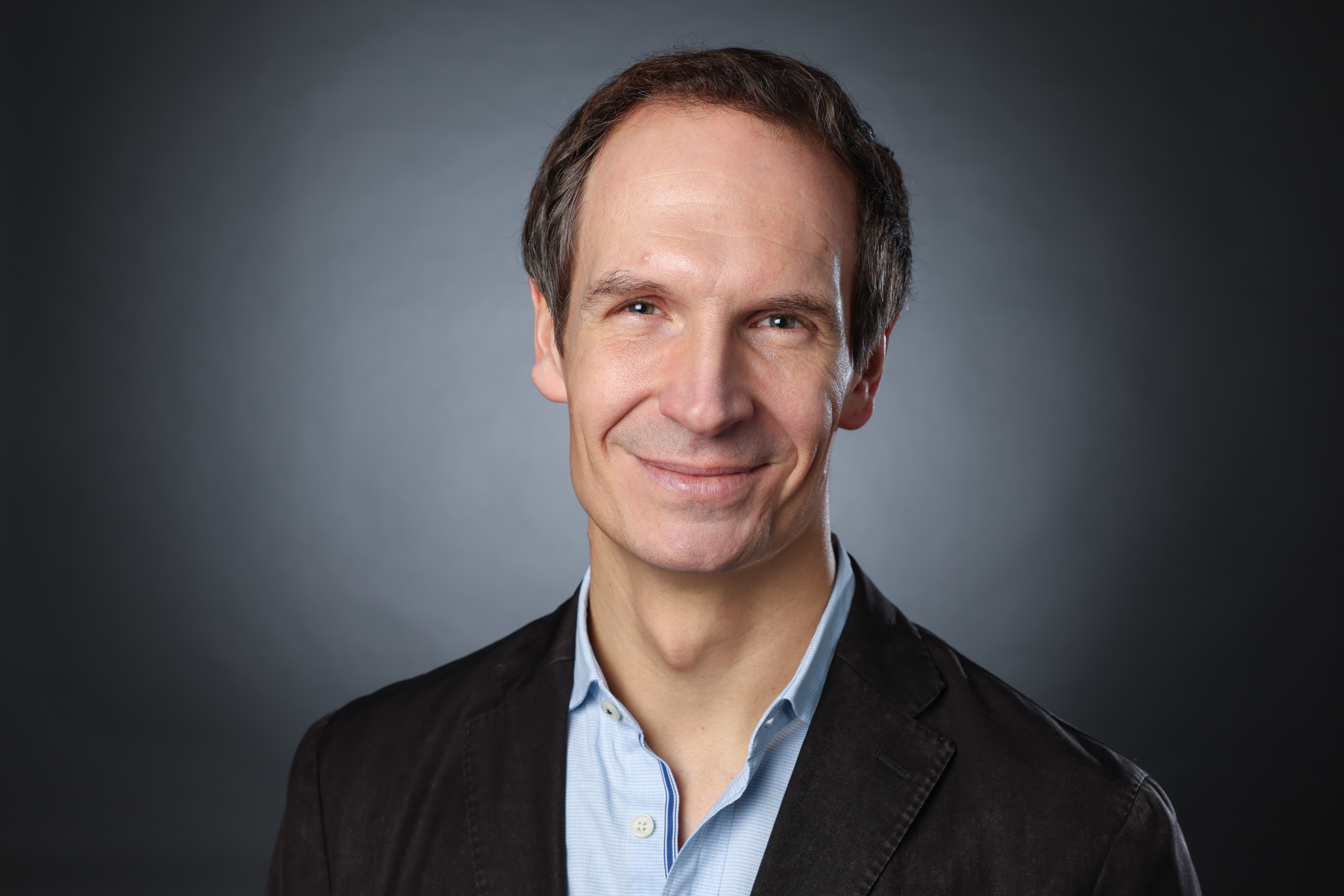
- Gräff in 2025
- Born: 11 June 1978 (age 48); St. Gallen, Switzerland
- Citizenship: Switzerland
Education
- Scientific career
- Fields: Neuroscience, Epigenetics
- Workplaces: École Polytechnique Fédérale de Lausanne (EPFL)
- Website: https://www.epfl.ch/labs/graefflab/

Johannes Gräff (born in St. Gallen, Switzerland, 11 June 1978) is a Swiss neuroscientist. He currently works as an associate professor at the École Polytechnique Fédérale de Lausanne (EPFL). His research focuses on the neuroepigenetic bases of physiological and pathological memory formation.

== Education and career ==
Johannes Gräff was born and raised in St.Gallen, Switzerland, where he attended high school at the Kantonsschule am Burggraben. He completed his undergraduate studies in biology at the University of Lausanne. During this time, he also spent one year at the University of British Columbia, where he started to become interested in neuroscience and psychology. His M.Sc. thesis, conducted with Laurent Keller in 2005, focused on the molecular causes of aging in ants. From 2005 to 2009, he completed his PhD at the Swiss Federal Institute of Technology in Zürich (ETHZ) in the lab of Isabelle Mansuy working on neuroepigenetic mechanisms that regulate learning and memory. In 2009, he moved to the Massachusetts Institute of Technology to start his postdoctoral work under the supervision of Li-Huei Tsai at the Picower Institute for Learning and Memory, focussing on a better understanding of the epigenetic processes underlying Alzheimer's disease and post-traumatic stress disorder (PTSD).

Johannes Gräff was appointed assistant professor on tenure track at the Brain Mind Institute of the School of Life Sciences at EPFL in 2013. He was promoted to associate professor with tenure in 2020.

== Research ==
As a PhD student in Isabelle Mansuy's laboratory, Johannes Gräff identified the first protein phosphatase to regulate epigenetic mechanisms during learning and memory and demonstrated that epigenetic modifications accompany the spatiotemporal dynamics of memory consolidation.

During his postdoctoral work in Li-Huei Tsai's laboratory, he went on to show that epigenetic mechanisms are causally involved in cognitive decline linked to neurodegeneration, and uncovered epigenetic pathways that enable the attenuation of long-term traumatic memories in a mouse model of post-traumatic stress disorder.

Since establishing his laboratory at EPFL’s Brain Mind Institute, Johannes Gräff's laboratory has led groundbreaking work including the discovery of the first methylation quantitative trait locus associated with Alzheimer's disease, and the identification of the neural circuits and engram cells that govern the attenuation of long-lasting traumatic memories.

More recently, his lab has made significant conceptual advances in the understanding of epigenetic mechanisms in mnemonic processes: his group revealed that before memory encoding, epigenetic plasticity pre-determines the selection of neurons for memory trace formation; while after encoding, they showed that manipulating the epigenetic state of a single genomic locus in a defined cell population is both necessary and sufficient to bidirectionally control memory storage. Such malleability of epigenetic modifications also forms the basis for evaluating their translational potential to treat cognitive disorders, which the group pursues in both preclinical and clinical studies.

== Selected works ==
- Khalaf O., Resch S., Dixsaut L., Gorden V., Glauser L. and J. Gräff, "Reactivation of recall-induced neurons contributes to remote fear memory attenuation.", Science, 360, 1239-1242 (2018)
- Sanchez-Mut J.V., Heyn H., Silva B.A., Dixsaut L., Garcia-Esparcia P., Vidal E., Sayols S., Glauser L., Monteagudo-Sánchez A., Perez-Tur J., Ferrer I., Monk D., Schneider B., Esteller M. and J. Gräff, "PM20D1 is a methylation quantitative trait locus associated with Alzheimer's disease.", Nature Medicine, 24, 598-603 (2018)
- Silva B.A., Astori S., Burns A.M., Heiser H., van den Heuvel L., Santoni G., Martinez-Reza M.F., Sandi C., and J. Gräff, "A thalamo-amygdalar circuit underlying the extinction of remote fear memories", Nature Neuroscience, 24, 964-974 (2021)
- Burns A.M, Farinelli-Scharly M., Hugues-Ascery S., Santoni G., Sanchez-Mut J.V., and J. Gräff, "The HDAC inhibitor CI-994 acts as a molecular memory aid by facilitating synaptic and intracellular communication after learning", PNAS, 119 (22) e2116797119 (2022)
- Santoni G., Astori S., Leleu M., Glauser L., Zamora S.A., Schioppa M., Tarulli I., Sandi C., and J. Gräff, "Chromatin plasticity predetermines neuronal eligibility for memory trace formation", Science, 385(6707): eadg9982 (2024)
- Coda D.M., Watt L., Glauser L., Batiuk M., Burns A.B., Stahl C.L., Wong L.Y., and J. Gräff, "Cell type and locus-specific epigenetic editing of memory expression", Nature Genetics, 57, 2661-2668 (2025)

== Distinctions ==
Since setting up his own research group at EPFL in 2013, Johannes has become a Brain & Behavior Research Foundation Independent Investigator, an MQ fellow, a Vallee Scholar, a Chan Zuckerberg Initiative researcher and a founding member of the FENS-KAVLI Network of Excellence. He has received both a European Research Council Starting and Consolidator Grant, as well as the Young Investigator Award of the Swiss Society for Biological Psychiatry in 2014, the Boehringer Ingelheim Federation of European Neuroscience Societies Research Award in 2020, and the Robert Bing Prize in 2022. In 2022, he won the Polysphère Award for best teaching in Life Sciences at EPFL.

He is a member of research societies such as the Swiss Society for Neuroscience, the Molecular and Cellular Cognition Society, a founding member of the FENS-Kavli Network of Excellence and was an Executive Committee member of the European Brain and Behaviour Society from 2015 to 2018. Between 2016 and 2018 he also served on the Program Committee of the Federation of European Neuroscience Societies Forum 2018.

Currently, Johannes Gräff serves on the scientific advisory board for the Centre de Biologie Integrative in Toulouse, is a panel member of the Swiss National Science Foundation, director of EPFL’s doctoral program in neuroscience and of EPFL’s Synapsy Center for Mental Health Research.

== Extracurricular activities ==
Beyond his own research, Johannes Gräff has been a regular contributor to the science section of the Swiss newspaper Neue Zürcher Zeitung, where he writes on topics spanning neuroscience and psychology. He is also a frequent invited speaker during Brain Awareness Week and engages broad audiences through public lectures aimed at fostering a better understanding of memory and memory disorders.

Outdoor enthusiast, avid runner and mountaineer, Johannes Gräff has completed the Jungfrau Marathon in 2019, and participated in several trail races such as the Humani’Trail, the Transruinalta or the Course des Pavés. As mountaineer, he has summited multiple 4000m peaks in Switzerland such as the Finsteraarhorn, Nadelhorn or Mönch.

Johannes Gräff is married and has two children.
