= Elizabeth Quinlan =

Elizabeth Quinlan may refer to:

- Elizabeth Quinlan (sociologist)
- Elizabeth Quinlan (neuroscientist)

== See also ==
- Elizabeth C. Quinlan House, Minneapolis, Minnesota
