= Isabelle Mansuy =

Neuroscientist

Isabelle M. Mansuy
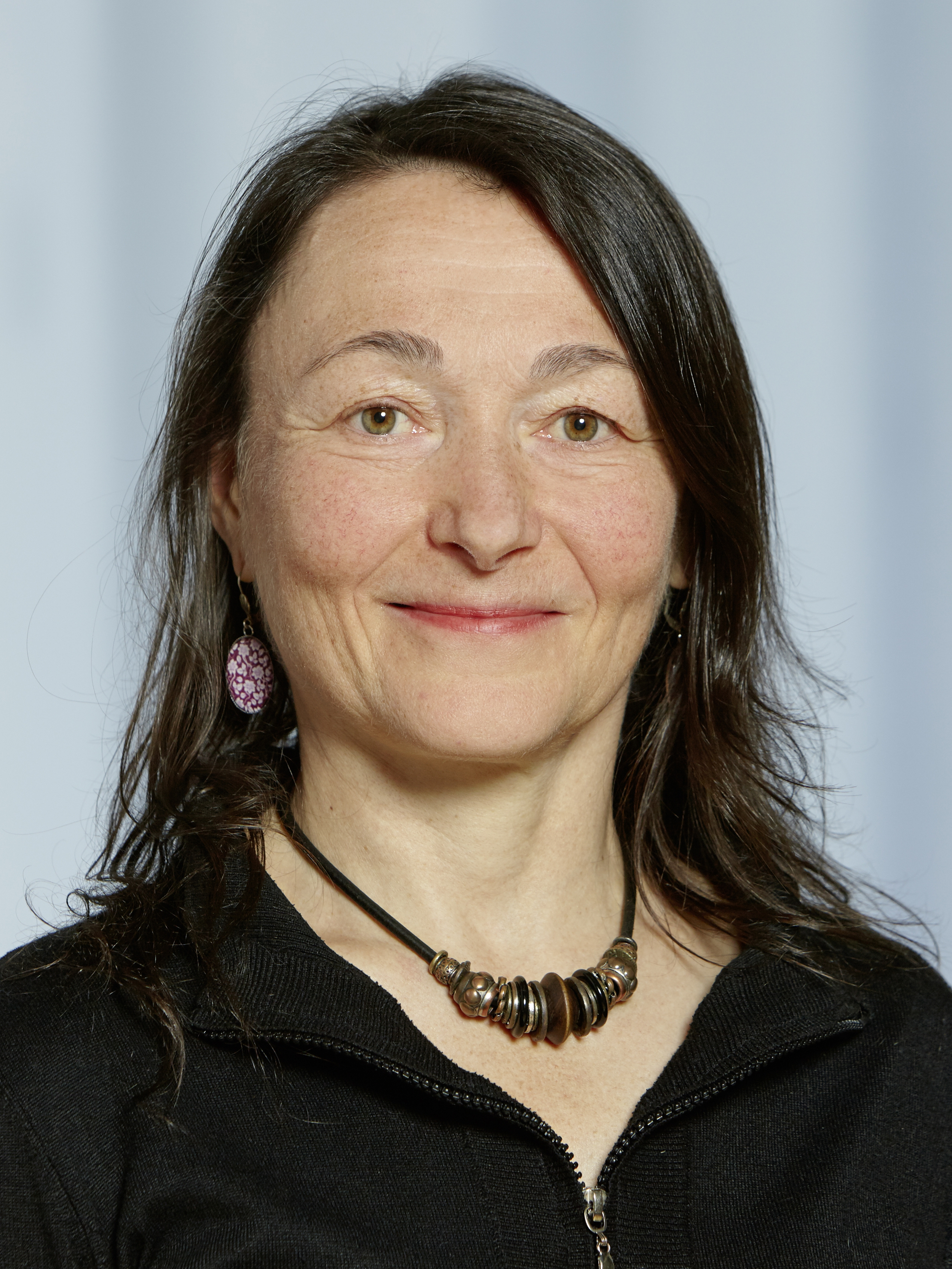
- Isabelle Mansuy in July 2019
- Born: December 5, 1965 (age 60); Cornimont, France
- Education: École supérieure de biotechnologie Strasbourg and University of Strasbourg (Masters), Friedrich Miescher Institute and University of Strasbourg (PhD), Columbia University (Post-doc)
- Known for: Protein phosphatases in memory, epigenetic inheritance, neuroepigenetics
- Scientific career
- Fields: Neuroepigenetics, Molecular psychiatry
- Workplaces: University of Zürich, Swiss Federal Institute of Technology Zürich
- Academic advisors: Eric Kandel (postdoctoral advisor)
- Website: https://www.mansuylab.ch/

Isabelle M. Mansuy (born December 5, 1965, in Cornimont, France) is a professor in neuroepigenetics in the Medical Faculty of the University of Zurich and the Department of Health Science and Technology of the Swiss Federal Institute of Technology Zurich. She is known for her work on the mechanisms of epigenetic inheritance in relation to childhood trauma.

== Education and career ==
Mansuy studied molecular biology and biotechnology at the University Louis Pasteur and the École Supérieure de Biotechnologie de Strasbourg. Mansuy went on to earn a PhD at the Friedrich Miescher Institute in Basel then a postdoc at Columbia University, where she gained expertise in neurobiology and in the design and use of transgenic mouse models. She established a lab as assistant professor at ETH Zürich at the end of 1998 and a few years later became professor in neuroepigenetics at the University of Zürich and ETH Zürich.

== Research ==
Mansuy initially worked on the molecular mechanisms of memory using mouse models. Her team revealed the specific molecules that allow the adult brain to forget through constraining memory formation and storage. It identified protein phosphatase 1 (PP1) and calcineurin as such molecular suppressors and demonstrated that these molecules need to be inhibited through training to relieve their suppressing action on neuronal activity necessary for memorisation. Her team was also able to demonstrate the detrimental effects of the excess of these molecules in the diseased and aged brain, highlighting their link to memory deficits and cognitive decline in aging. Another important finding was that PP1 is a key epigenetic regulator in neurons that controls the post-translational modification of histones and therefore genome activity. The role of such an enzyme in epigenetic regulation in relation to cognitive processes was not known before, these findings participated to found the new field of neuroepigenetics that emerged in late 2000, and opened unexpected therapeutic perspectives linking the epigenome to memory diseases.

Mansuy's current research examines the epigenetic basis of complex brain functions and physiological changes in mammals with a focus on the mechanisms of epigenetic inheritance. The goal is to determine how life experiences can influence mental and physical health across generations and what molecular mechanisms are involved. The research is focused on how adverse experiences in early life can lead to psychiatric and metabolic disorders. Mouse models and cellular systems are used to study non-coding RNAs, epigenetic factors and chromatin remodelling in the brain and germline, and elucidate how they are involved in the expression and subsequent transmission of environmentally-induced phenotypes. Her lab showed that the effects of traumatic stress in early life can be transmitted across multiple generations in mice and that RNA in sperm is a vector of transmission. Recent work showed that blood factors are involved in transmission mechanisms and have been validated in human subjects.

== Awards and honours ==
- 2017 Elected member of the European Academy of Sciences
- 2016 Knight in the Order of the Legion of Honour, France
- 2011 Elected member of the Research Council of the Swiss National Science Foundation
- 2011 Knight in the Order of Merit, France
- 2010 Elected member of the Swiss Academy of Medical Sciences
- 2008 Robert Bing Prize
- 2006 EMBO member
- 2004 FEBS Anniversary Award
- 2004 Boehringer Ingelheim FENS Research Award
- 2001 EMBO Young Investigator Program Award
- 1997 Fyssen Foundation Research Award

== Selected works ==
- Winder, Danny G; Mansuy, Isabelle M; Osman, Mona; Moallem, Theodore M; Kandel, Eric R (1998). "Genetic and pharmacological evidence for a novel, intermediate phase of long-term potentiation suppressed by calcineurin". Cell. 92 (1): 25–37. doi:10.1016/S0092-8674(00)80896-X. PMID 9489697. S2CID 18429683.
- Mansuy, Isabelle M; Mayford, Mark; Jacob, Betsy; Kandel, Eric R; Bach, Mary Elizabeth (1998). "Restricted and regulated overexpression reveals calcineurin as a key component in the transition from short-term to long-term memory". Cell. 92 (1): 39–49. doi:10.1016/S0092-8674(00)80897-1. PMID 9489698. S2CID 11586300.
- Franklin, Tamara B.; Saab, Bechara J.; Mansuy, Isabelle M. (2012). "Neural mechanisms of stress resilience and vulnerability". Neuron. 75 (5): 747–761. doi:10.1016/j.neuron.2012.08.016. PMID 22958817. S2CID 16257483.
- Gräff, Johannes; Mansuy, Isabelle M. (2008). "Epigenetic codes in cognition and behaviour". Behavioural Brain Research. 192 (1): 70–87. doi:10.1016/j.bbr.2008.01.021. PMID 18353453. S2CID 5788700.
- Franklin, Tamara B.; Russig, Holger; Weiss, Isabelle C.; Gräff, Johannes; Linder, Natacha; Michalon, Aubin; Vizi, Sandor; Mansuy, Isabelle M. (2010). "Epigenetic transmission of the impact of early stress across generations". Biological Psychiatry. 68 (5): 408–415. doi:10.1016/j.biopsych.2010.05.036. PMID 20673872. S2CID 15851484.
- Mansuy, Isabelle M.; Gurret, Jean-Michel; Lefief-Delcourt, Alix (2019). Reprenez le contrôle de vos gènes: Améliorez votre vie et celles de vos descendant avec l'épigénétique. Larousse. ISBN 978-2-03-595626-2.
