= Picower Institute for Learning and Memory =

Neuroscience institute at MIT

Coordinates: 42.362294°N 71.091626°W

Picopower Institute
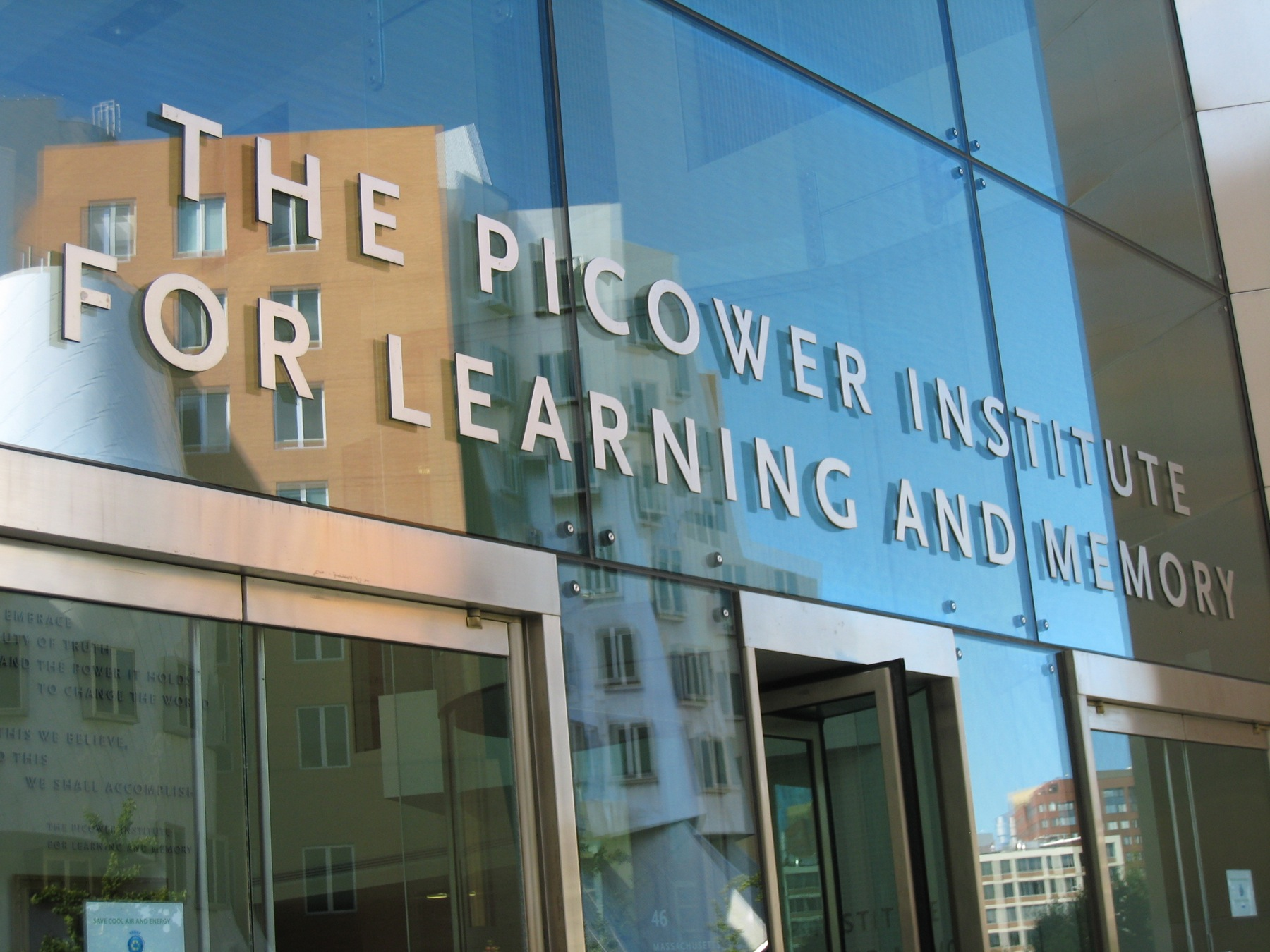
- Picower Institute reflecting the Stata Center.
- Named after: Jeffrey M. and Barbara Picower
- Formation: 1994; 32 years ago
- Founder: Susumu Tonegawa
- Headquarters: Cambridge, Massachusetts
- Director: Myriam Heiman
- Director (2009-2026): Li-Huei Tsai
- Director (2007-2009): Mark F. Bear
- Director (1998-2006): Susumu Tonegawa
- Website: https://picower.mit.edu
- Formerly called: MIT Center for Learning and Memory

The Picower Institute for Learning and Memory is one of the three neuroscience groups at MIT along with the McGovern Institute for Brain Research and the Department of Brain and Cognitive Sciences. The institute focuses on studying various aspects of learning and memory, including diseases such as Alzheimer's and schizophrenia. It has received over US$50 million for research in these areas.

== Research conference ==
In 2006, New York Times Magazine did an eight page story titled An Anti-Addiction Pill? on the invitation-only conference for neuroscientists, clinicians, and public policy makers that the institute had held in May of 2006 to address the neuroscience approach to solving addictions.

Establishment and Funding

The institute was established in 1994, primarily funded by:

- The Sherman Fairchild Foundation
- The RIKEN Brain Science Institute
- The National Institute of Mental Health

It was renamed after receiving a $50 million grant by the Picower Foundation in 2002.

Leadership

The directors of the institute were the following:

- Nobel Prize laureate Susumu Tonegawa, the founding director in 1994 of the MIT Center for Learning, which became the Picower Institute in 2002. Tonegawa resigned on December 31, 2006, believing that “a new generation of leadership is needed.”
- Professor Mark F. Bear (2007-2009)
- Professor Li-Huei Tsai, who became the director on July 1, 2009
- The current director is Myriam Heiman, who became director on July 1, 2026

== Gallery ==
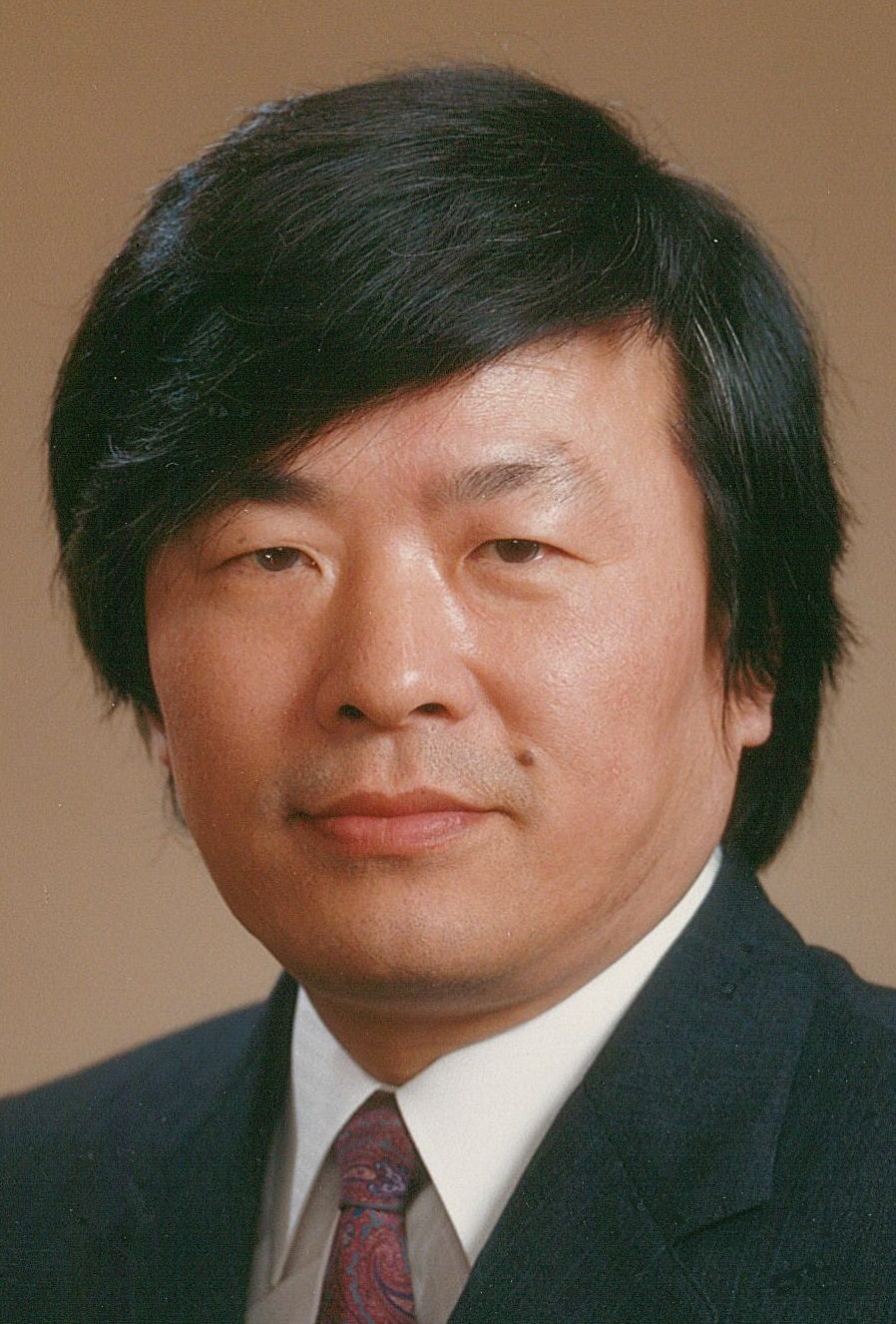
Susumu Tonegawa. Founder and first director of the institute from 1998-2006.

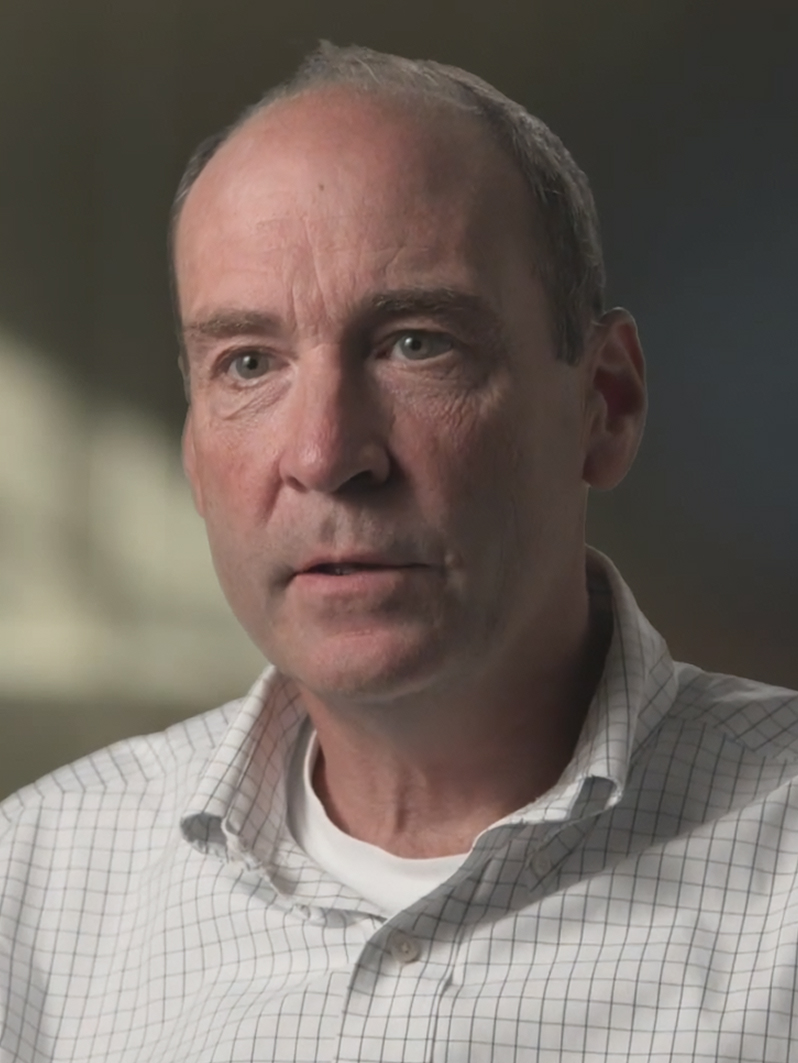
Mark Bear (2007-2009)

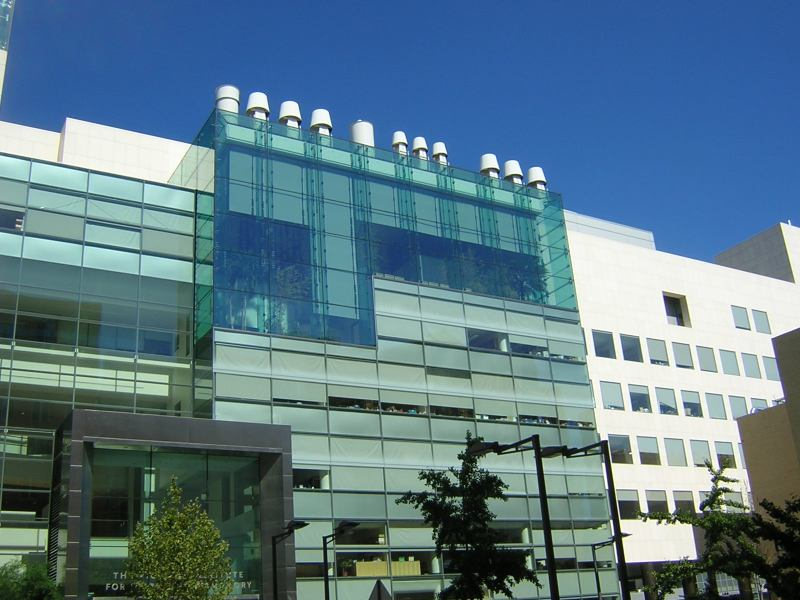
Exterior of building for the Picower Institute at MIT Brain and Cognitive Sciences complex.
