= Elizabeth Quinlan (neuroscientist) =

American neuroscientist

- Born: Chicago, Illinois
- Occupations: Professor at the University of Maryland, Clark Leadership Chair in Neuroscience, Director of the Brain and Behavior Institute (BBI)

Academic background
- Education: University of Iowa, University of Illinois at Chicago
- Academic advisor: Mark F. Bear

Academic work
- Discipline: Neuroscience
- Sub-discipline: Plasticity
- Website: https://biology.umd.edu/elizabeth-quinlan.html

Elizabeth Quinlan is an American neuroscientist and a professor at the University of Maryland. There she serves as the Clark Leadership Chair in Neuroscience and as the Director of the Brain and Behavior Institute (BBI). Her research focuses on understanding how the plasticity of juvenile and adult mammalian visual systems differ.

== Background and education ==
Quinlan was born in Chicago, Illinois. She attended Amos Alonso Stagg High School and later attended the University of Iowa, where she earned a B.S. in psychology and minor in biology. She then received her Ph.D. in physiology from the University of Illinois at Chicago. Quinlan completed her first postdoctoral training at the University of Virginia in cell biology. Later, she completed another postdoctoral training at Brown University, where she worked in Mark Bear's lab studying the mechanisms of experience-dependent brain modification in mammals.

== Career and research ==
In 1999, Quinlan alongside Benjamin D. Philpot, Richard L. Huganir, and Mark F. Bear conducted several experiments on the visual cortexes of rats in vivo. Their work has shown that the regulation of postsynaptic glutamate receptors is a mechanism of synaptic plasticity in the brain.

Quinlan began her lab in 2001, studying how experiences affect the juvenile and adult mammalian brains through visual system plasticity. Her research indicates that visual deprivation through dark exposure reactivates critical period plasticity in adults, which can be used to promote recovery of amblyopia, or lazy eye. Following her lab, Quinlan and Ben Backus from SUNY College of Optometry acquired enough funding from the National Institute of Health to begin a human trial. The trial included two human participants who were allowed to live together in the dark for ten days. Results from this study were inclusive, although the two participants self-reported an improvement in their vision. In 2016, Quinlan became the first director of the Physiological Systems graduate program at University of Maryland. She is one of three co-directors of the Brain and Behavior campus initiative at University of Maryland.
