= Ed Harlow =

American molecular biologist

- Known for: Retinoblastoma protein
- Scientific career
- Institutions: Harvard Medical School

Ed Harlow (born 1952) is an American molecular biologist.

== Biography ==
Harlow received the Ph.D. degree from the Imperial Cancer Research Fund Laboratories in London.

== Academic career ==
Harlow is professor of Biological Chemistry and Molecular Pharmacology at Harvard Medical School. He has been associate director of the Dana–Farber Cancer Institute as well as research director of the Massachusetts General Hospital Cancer Center and the National Cancer Institute. From 2009 to 2011 he was Chief Scientific Officer at Constellation Pharmaceuticals.

Among Harlow's discoveries was the demonstration that the retinoblastoma protein interacts with viral transforming proteins, thereby linking tumor viruses with the cell cycle. He is also the author, with David Lane, of "Using antibodies: a laboratory manual." (1999).

Dr. Harlow has trained scientists in the field of molecular biology and oncology, including Nicholas Dyson (Professor at Harvard Medical School and Scientific Director of the Massachusetts General Hospital Cancer Center), Jacqueline Lees (Professor of Biology at MIT and associate director of the Koch Institute), Joshua LaBaer (Virginia G. Piper Chair in Personalized Medicine at Arizona State University and Director of the Biodesign Institute), Matthew Meyerson (Professor of Pathology at the Dana–Farber Cancer Institute and Harvard Medical School and Senior Associate Member of the Broad Institute), Li-Huei Tsai (Picower Professor of Neuroscience at MIT and Director of the Picower Center for Learning and Memory), and Marc Vidal (Director of the Center for Cancer Systems Biology at the Dana–Farber Cancer Institute).

== Published works ==
- Dyson, Nicholas, et al. "The human papilloma virus-16 E7 oncoprotein is able to bind to the retinoblastoma gene product." Science 243.4893 (1989): 934–937.
- Whyte, Peter, et al. "Association between an oncogene and an anti-oncogene: the adenovirus E1A proteins bind to the retinoblastoma gene product." (1988): 124–129.
- LaBaer, Joshua, et al. "New functional activities for the p21 family of CDK inhibitors." Genes & development 11.7 (1997): 847–862.
- Buchkovich, Karen, Linda A. Duffy, and Ed Harlow. "The retinoblastoma protein is phosphorylated during specific phases of the cell cycle." Cell 58.6 (1989): 1097–1105.
- van den Heuvel, Sander, and Ed Harlow. "Distinct roles for cyclin-dependent kinases in cell cycle control." Science 262.5142 (1993): 2050–2054.
- Harlow, E. D., et al. "Monoclonal antibodies specific for simian virus 40 tumor antigens." Journal of Virology 39.3 (1981): 861–869.
- Tsai, Li-Huei, et al. "p35 is a neural-specific regulatory subunit of cyclin-dependent kinase 5." (1994): 419–423.
- Meyerson, Matthew, et al. "A family of human cdc2-related protein kinases." The EMBO Journal 11.8 (1992): 2909.
- Whyte, Peter, Nicola M. Williamson, and E. D. Harlow. "Cellular targets for transformation by the adenovirus E1A proteins." cell 56.1 (1989): 67–75.

== Awards and recognition ==
- National Academy of Sciences, Member
- Alfred P. Sloan, Jr. Prize
- American Academy of Arts and Sciences, Member
- Dickson Prize in Medicine
- National Academy of Medicine, Member
- American Cancer Society, Medal of Honor
