= Nicholas Dyson =

American geneticist

- Known for: E2F and pRB
- Scientific career
- Institutions: Massachusetts General Hospital Cancer Center
- Academic advisors: Ed Harlow
- Doctoral students: Simon Boulton; Adam Brook
- Website: www.massgeneral.org/cancer/research/researchlab.aspx?id=1166

Nicholas Dyson is Professor of Medicine at Harvard Medical School, the James and Shirley Curvey MGH Research Scholar and Scientific Director of the Massachusetts General Hospital Cancer Center.

== Research ==
The Dyson Lab studies the retinoblastoma protein.

Working as a post-doctoral fellow in the laboratory of Dr. Ed Harlow, Dyson demonstrated that the retinoblastoma protein can form complexes in vitro with the E7 oncoprotein of Human papilloma virus type-16. This result implicated pRB binding to E7 as a step in human papilloma virus-associated carcinogenesis.

More recently, Dyson's group has shown that the transcription factor E2F1 is a potent and specific inhibitor of beta-catenin/T-cell factor (TCF)-dependent transcription, and that this function contributes to E2F1-induced apoptosis.

As of 2015, Professor Dyson has 140 publications in leading peer-reviewed journals.
