= Adam Brook =

American thoracic surgeon

Adam Brook is an American thoracic surgeon who is a surgical attending at St. Joseph's Medical Center in New York.

== Biography ==
Dr. Brook received the A.B. degree in biology from Harvard University and the M.D. from Harvard Medical School. He also received the Ph.D. in genetics from the Harvard Graduate School of Arts and Sciences. Brook completed his doctoral research in the laboratory of Professor Nicholas Dyson of the Massachusetts General Hospital Cancer Center. Brook subsequently completed thoracic surgical training at the University of Tennessee Health Science Center and then served as Specialist Registrar in Cardiothoracic Surgery at Barts Health NHS Trust in London, under Mr. Alan Wood. Brook is currently an attending thoracic surgeon at St. Joseph's Medical Center and the Northport Veterans Administration Medical Center in New York.

== Academic work ==
Dr. Brook is a specialist in the treatment of lung cancer. His research has focused on molecular mechanisms of carcinogenesis and on the connections between the cell cycle and development. Brook showed that the cell cycle transcription factor E2F was required to activate differentiation in mammalian and Drosophila post-mitotic cells.

Dr. Brook has also conducted epidemiologic research demonstrating the causative inter-relationships between cigarette smoking, pulmonary disease and poverty.
