= Gentry Patrick =

American biologist

- Born: Gentry Namón Patrick; South Los Angeles
- Education: University of California, Berkeley (SB); University of California, San Francisco (MS); Harvard University (PhD)
- Scientific career
- Workplaces: University of California, San Diego; California Institute of Technology
- Thesis: Regulation of the p35/cdk5 kinase in neuronal development and neurodegenerative disease (1999)
- Doctoral advisor: Li-Huei Tsai
- Website: biology.ucsd.edu/research/faculty/gpatrick

Gentry Namón Patrick is an American biologist and Professor of Neurobiology at the University of California, San Diego. His research investigates the mechanisms that underpin synaptic activity in the central nervous system. He is interested in learning, the formation of memories and the processes that cause Alzheimer's disease and Parkinson's disease.

== Early life and education ==
Patrick grew up in South Los Angeles. He spent his childhood in Compton and Watts. He was first inspired to work in science after taking part in an experimental biology laboratory, and would become the first member of his family to attend college. He earned his undergraduate degree at the University of California, Berkeley. Patrick completed a master's degree at the University of California, San Francisco, where he studied Pho85, a cyclin-dependent kinase involved in cell cycle progression. Patrick earned his doctoral degree at Harvard University, where he worked with the neuroscientist Li-Huei Tsai.

== Research and career ==
After his PhD, Patrick was a postdoctoral researcher at the California Institute of Technology (Caltech). Patrick joined the University of California, San Diego (UCSD) in 2004. His research investigates the synthesis and degradation of proteins at synapses, the dynamic control of which is required for neuroplasticity and signalling cascades. Patrick focusses on the role of the ubiquitin proteasome pathway in synaptic plasticity, and how it regulates AMPA (α-amino-3-hydroxy-5-methyl-4-isoxazolepropionic acid)-type receptor trafficking neurons. He investigates how the activated synapses on a neuron become modified because of synaptic plasticity. Patrick makes use of fluorescence-based proteasome reporters and time-modulated microscopy. He is interested in the role of the ubiquitin proteasome pathway in neurodegenerative diseases.

Throughout his academic career he was involved with programmes to widen the participation in science and technology. He has led outreach schemes that welcomed students from underrepresented communities into the biomedical laboratories of UCSD and was a mentor to children on science enrichment programmes. In 2015 Patrick was appointed the UCSD Director of Mentorship and Diversity. He delivered the UCSD convocation speech in 2019. In 2019 PATHways to STEM, an educational programme launched by Patrick, was supported by the Chan Zuckerberg Initiative.

=== Selected publications ===
His publications include:

- Patrick, Gentry N.; Zukerberg, Lawrence; Nikolic, Margareta; de la Monte, Suzanne; Dikkes, Pieter; Tsai, Li-Huei (1999). "Conversion of p35 to p25 deregulates Cdk5 activity and promotes neurodegeneration". Nature. 402 (6762): 615–622. Bibcode:1999Natur.402..615P. doi:10.1038/45159. ISSN 1476-4687. PMID 10604467. S2CID 4414281.
- Zukerberg, Lawrence R; Patrick, Gentry N; Nikolic, Margareta; Humbert, Sandrine; Wu, Chin-Lee; Lanier, Lorene M; Gertler, Frank B; Vidal, Marc; Van Etten, Richard A; Tsai, Li-Huei (2000). "Cables Links Cdk5 and c-Abl and Facilitates Cdk5 Tyrosine Phosphorylation, Kinase Upregulation, and Neurite Outgrowth". Neuron. 26 (3): 633–646. doi:10.1016/S0896-6273(00)81200-3. hdl:1721.1/83489. ISSN 0896-6273. PMID 10896159. S2CID 15142577.
- Patrick, Gentry N.; Zhou, Pengbo; Kwon, Young T.; Howley, Peter M.; Tsai, Li-Huei (1998). "p35, the Neuronal-specific Activator of Cyclin-dependent Kinase 5 (Cdk5) Is Degraded by the Ubiquitin-Proteasome Pathway". Journal of Biological Chemistry. 273 (37): 24057–24064. doi:10.1074/jbc.273.37.24057. ISSN 0021-9258. PMID 9727024. S2CID 7427579.
