= Jacqueline Lees =

British biochemist

Jacqueline A. Lees
- Education: University of York; University of London
- Scientific career
- Fields: Biochemistry, cancer biology
- Workplaces: Koch Institute for Integrative Cancer Research, MIT

Jacqueline A. Lees is a British biochemist.

Lees is the Virginia and D.K. Ludwig Professor for Cancer Research and associate director of the Koch Institute for Integrative Cancer Research at Massachusetts Institute of Technology. She received her BSc degree from the University of York in 1986, and her PhD from the University of London in 1990, both in biochemistry. She was a postdoc in the laboratory of Ed Harlow, first at Cold Spring Harbor and then at Massachusetts General Hospital, before joining the faculty at MIT in 1994.

== Research ==
Lees’ research is focused on identifying the proteins and pathways that play a key role in tumorigenicity and establishing the mechanism of their action in both normal and tumor cells. Her lab at MIT uses a combination of molecular and cellular analyses and mutant mouse models. She is also known for her work with Nancy Hopkins on genetic screens in zebrafish. Lees studies how the E2F family of mammalian transcription factors contributes to the regulation of cellular proliferation during normal development and tumorigenesis. Her work has shown that certain E2Fs, despite substantial biochemical similarities, play radically different biological roles.
