= Simon Boulton =

British scientist

- Born: Simon Joseph Boulton
- Education: University of Cambridge (PhD); University of Edinburgh (BSc)
- Awards: Crick Lecture (2011); EMBO Gold Medal (2011); Colworth Medal; EMBO member (2009)
- Scientific career
- Workplaces: University of Dundee; Cancer Research UK, London Research Institute; University of Cambridge; University of Edinburgh; Gurdon Institute; Harvard Medical School; University College London
- Thesis: The functional characterisation of Ku in the budding yeast, Saccharomyces cerevisiae (1998)
- Website: www.london-research-institute.org.uk/research/simon-boulton

Simon Joseph Boulton FRS is a British scientist who has made important contributions to the understanding of DNA repair and the treatment of cancer resulting from DNA damage. He currently occupies the position of Senior Scientist and group leader of the DSB Repair Metabolism Laboratory at the Francis Crick Institute, London. He is also an honorary Professor at University College London.

== Early life and education ==
Boulton studied Molecular Biology at the University of Edinburgh, then studied for a Ph.D. at the University of Cambridge under Professor Steve Jackson of the Gurdon Institute from 1994 to 1998. It was at Cambridge that Boulton began researching mechanisms of DNA. He has described his first exposure to the research environment at Cambridge as "extremely influential."

== Research ==
The website of Cancer Research UK explains Boulton's work in this way: human DNA "is constantly under assault from chemical reactions taking place in our bodies and from things we're exposed to in our everyday lives....Most of the time, DNA damage is repaired successfully by the cell. But if the cell continues to grow whilst its DNA is already damaged, it can lead to cancer." Boulton is learning about DNA damage repair "by first studying it inside a microscopic worm called C. elegans and then extending these findings to human cells," an approach that has revealed "remarkable similarities between the genes and proteins used to repair DNA damage in the worm and in humans....By studying this fundamental process of DNA damage repair, the researchers have contributed to our understanding of how faults in the system can lead to cancer."

Boulton himself has explained his work at the DNA Damage Response Laboratory as follows: "DNA is a highly reactive molecule that is susceptible to damage. Fortunately, cells have evolved specialised repair processes that are remarkably efficient in correcting specific types of DNA damage. Failure to correctly repair DNA damage will lead to mutagenic change, which can contribute to ageing and cancer. Indeed, defects in genes that repair DNA damage are the underlying cause of a number of hereditary ageing/cancer predisposition syndromes such as Fanconi anemia and Blooms. The focus of my lab is to identify new DNA repair genes, understand how they work in DNA repair in mitotic and meiotic cells and determine how defects in these processes contribute to human disease such as cancer. We hope that our work will provide an improved understanding of how DNA repair works and how, when DNA repair is compromised, it contributes to cancer/ageing and or infertility disorders in humans." According to the Royal Society, Boulton's research has resulted in several major breakthroughs in understanding; these are viewed as highly promising with regard to the potential development of new cancer treatments.

=== DNA Damage Response Laboratory ===
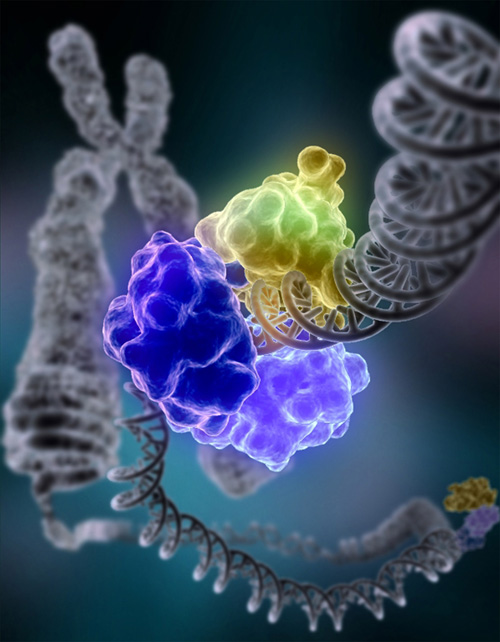
DNA damage, due to environmental factors and normal metabolic processes inside the cell. A special enzyme, DNA ligase (shown here in color), encircles the double helix to repair a broken strand of DNA. DNA ligase is responsible for repairing the millions of DNA breaks generated during the normal course of a cell's life. Without molecules that can mend such breaks, cells can malfunction, die, or become cancerous.

DNA is highly reactive and susceptible to damage from things we are exposed to in everyday life. Fortunately, DNA has evolved processes in which it has the ability to repair itself. If the damages are not repaired and it continues to grow, mutagenic changes occur causing ageing and cancer. Boulton is responsible for identifying these new DNA repair genes, understanding how these genes work in DNA, and determining how the defects in these processes contribute to human diseases. To fulfil these tasks, Boulton studies the DNA damage repair inside a specific worm called C. elegans, then extends these findings to human cells. Through this process, he has found "remarkable similarities between the genes and proteins used to repair DNA damage in the worm and in humans....By studying this fundamental process of DNA damage repair, the researchers have contributed to our understanding of how faults in the system can lead to cancer." Boulton's research has resulted in several major breakthroughs that are viewed as highly promising with regard to the potential development of new cancer treatments.

Boulton's papers about his work have appeared in a number of major scientific journals, such as Nature, Science, Cell, and Molecular Cell.

== Career ==
After receiving his Ph.D. from Cambridge, Boulton completed postdoctoral fellowships funded by the European Molecular Biology Organization and the Human Frontier Science Program at Harvard Medical School. He first worked under Professor Nicholas Dyson of the Massachusetts General Hospital Cancer Center, then under Professor Marc Vidal of the Dana Faber Cancer Institute at Harvard Medical School. In 2002, Boulton joined Cancer Research UK, working at its London Research Institute, Clare Hall Laboratories, in South Mimms, and in Hertfordshire. He established his own research group there, and was eventually promoted to Senior Scientist in 2007. He is a member of the Editorial Board for Genes & Development.

Boulton’s PhD supervisor, Stephen P. Jackson, has said that it is Boulton's distinctive combination of approaches that has allowed Boulton to make seminal contributions to DNA repair, genome instability, and cancer. Among Boulton's achievements is the discovery that the gene RTEL1 serves as an anti-recombinase that affects genome stability and cancer and counteracts toxic recombination. In addition, he and his team discovered the PBZ motif and determined that ALC1 (Amplified in Liver Cancer 1) is a poly(ADP-ribose)-activated chromatin-remodelling enzyme required for DNA repair, and that poly (ADP-ribosyl)ation (PAR) is a post-translational modification of proteins that play an important role in mediating protein interactions and the recruitment of specific protein targets.

Also, he has discovered that the Fanconi Anemia proteins FANCM and FAAP24 are required for checkpoint-kinase signalling (ATR) in response to DNA damage and established that DNA repair defects of Fanconi Anemia cells can be suppressed by blocking non-homologous end joining. He has also demonstrated that a newly identified helicase, RTEL1, plays a crucial role in repairing double-stranded DNA breaks by means of homologous recombination (HR) – a discovery that has great therapeutic significance and that has already led to the development of treatments, with a drug currently undergoing clinical tests.

The discoveries made in Boulton's laboratory have led to new therapeutic approaches. The findings about ALC1 may prove to have significant implications for the treatment of liver cancer. The discoveries about Fanconi Anemia proteins, moreover, suggest that NHEJ inhibitors might help suppress Fanconi Anemia patients' predisposition to cancer.

== Honours and awards ==
Boulton won the Colworth Medal from the Biochemical Society in 2006, and was selected to give the EACR Young Cancer Researcher of the Year award lecture in 2008. He was presented with the Eppendorf/Nature Young Investigator Award in 2008 for his research into DNA damage, specifically his work with RTEL1. He became a member of the European Molecular Biology Organization (EMBO) in 2009, and was awarded a Royal Society Wolfson Research Merit Award in 2010. He won the EMBO Gold Medal in 2011 for his research on DNA repair mechanisms. The election committee said that it was "particularly impressed by his pioneering role in establishing the nematode worm, C. elegans, as a model system to study genome instability." In 2011, Boulton was chosen to give the Royal Society Francis Crick Prize Lecture, an honour awarded annually by the Royal Society. He was selected for this honour in recognition of his achievements in the field of DNA repair. Boulton was elected as a Fellow of the Academy of Medical Sciences in 2012. In 2013, Boulton was the recipient of the Paul Marks Prize for Cancer Research, which recognises a new generation of leaders in cancer research who are making significant contributions to the understanding of cancer. He was elected a Fellow of the Royal Society in May 2022.
