= Li-Huei Tsai =

Taiwanese-American neuroscientist

- 蔡立慧
- Born: March 18, 1960 (age 66); Taiwan
- Education: University of Texas Southwestern Medical Center
- Scientific career
- Fields: Neuroscience
- Workplaces: Cold Spring Harbor Laboratory; Massachusetts General Hospital; Harvard Medical School; MIT
- Doctoral advisor: Ed Harlow
- Doctoral students: Gentry Patrick
- Website: tsailaboratory.mit.edu/li-huei-tsai/

Li-Huei Tsai (Chinese: 蔡立慧; born 18 March 1960) is an American neuroscientist and the director of the Picower Institute for Learning and Memory in the Department of Brain and Cognitive Sciences at the Massachusetts Institute of Technology.

She is known for her work on neurological disorders that affect learning and memory, particularly for her research on Alzheimer's disease and the role of CDK5 and chromatin remodeling in the progression of the disease. Additionally, her laboratory has innovated numerous applications of induced pluripotent stem cells for in vitro modeling of neurological diseases.

== Education and career ==
Tsai was born and raised in Taiwan. In 1984, she received a fellowship to pursue a master's degree in veterinary medicine at the University of Wisconsin-Madison. After attending a series of lectures delivered by Nobel Prize laureate and cancer researcher Howard Temin, she developed an interest in molecular cancer research. Tsai earned her PhD in 1990 from the University of Texas Southwestern Medical Center. In 1991, Tsai joined the laboratory of Ed Harlow at the Cold Spring Harbor Laboratory and then the Massachusetts General Hospital Cancer Center. In 1994, Tsai joined the faculty in the Department of Pathology at Harvard Medical School. She moved to MIT in 2006.

She was appointed director of the MIT Picower Institute for Learning and Memory in 2009, and is a founding member of its Aging Brain Initiative, with co-researchers Edward Boyden and Emery N. Brown, among others.

With fellow MIT professor Boyden, she co-founded MIT spinoff company, Cognito Therapeutics, in 2016. The company developed a non-invasive, investigative therapeutic platform and connecting neurostimulation device, Spectris, for individual Alzheimer's patient use, which received FDA Breakthrough Device Designation in 2021.

In 2019, Tsai became co-director of the Alana Down Syndrome Center at MIT.

== Research ==
Tsai has written or co-written over 500 academic articles, with a h-index of 146 in 2026.

In the Harlow laboratory, Tsai studied cyclin-dependent kinases in order to identify their role in cell division. Tsai became interested in CDK5, which she found was not only inactive in cancer cells, but inactive in all other tissue cells except for the brain. She also found that Cdk5 requires p35 to be active.

After moving to Harvard Medical School, she began to investigate the function of CDK5 and p35. Tsai found that mice lacking p35 displayed cortical lamination defects and were prone to seizures, and that CDK5-p35 activity was essential for neurite outgrowth during neuronal differentiation. Tsai also discovered that while Cdk5 activity is essential to proper brain development and function, overexpression of Cdk5 was associated with Alzheimer's disease. Tsai observed that a truncated version of p35 called p25 accumulated in diseased or damaged brain tissue in mice and in tissue samples from deceased Alzheimer's patients. In an experiment with genetically-engineered mice, Tsai found that increased expression of CDK5 led to the development of Alzheimer's-like symptoms such as a decline in learning and cognition, profound neural loss in the forebrain, and that amyloid plaques developed within weeks.

After moving to MIT in 2006, Tsai began to investigate how to ameliorate or reverse Alzheimer's symptoms. In a 2007 study, Tsai trained mice to find and remember a platform submerged in a murky pool. When she induced Alzheimer's-like symptoms, the mice could no longer find the platform; however, after spending some time in an enriched environment, those same mice could locate platform immediately, indicating their memories had returned. Tsai was able to replicate the same effects as the enriched environment by treating the mice with a drug that inhibited a chromatin-remodeling class of enzymes called histone deacetylases, or HDACs. In later studies, Tsai showed that HDAC2 creates an epigenetic blockade of genes that regulate structural and synaptic plasticity and that some cognitive function could be restored by inhibiting HDAC2 activity.

Tsai has elucidated the role of structural and epigenetic mechanisms in Alzheimer's disease, showing in two 2015 studies that the DNA breakage necessary to learning was also responsible for cognitive decline, due to decline in DNA repair systems with age, and that the genetic component of Alzheimer's primarily affects the regulatory circuitry of immune processes, rather than neuronal processes as expected.

In 2016, Tsai demonstrated that visual stimulation of mice with an LED flashing at 40 hertz substantially reduces the beta amyloid plaques associated with Alzheimer's disease, likely by inducing gamma oscillations. There are several caveats to consider in the study. No research has yet demonstrated that the effects will hold in humans. It is unlikely that light therapy would be effective, as the therapy did not affect the hippocampus, which is a major area of the brain affected in Alzheimer's disease. In the mice, the reduction in beta-amyloid was only found in the brain's visual cortex.

In more recent work, Tsai has created a lab-engineered model of the Blood-Brain Barrier to investigate how Alzheimer disease risk genes, namely APOE, contribute to breakdown of the brain's vasculature.

== Awards ==
- 1997 Investigator, Howard Hughes Medical Institute
- 2008 Academician, Academia Sinica
- 2010 Glenn Award for Research in Biological Mechanisms of Aging
- 2011 Member, National Academy of Medicine
- 2011 Fellow, American Association for the Advancement of Science
- 2016 Mika Salpeter Lifetime Achievement Award, Society for Neuroscience
- 2019 Fellow, National Academy of Inventors
- 2019 Hans Wigzell Research Foundation Science Prize

== See also ==
- Alzheimer's disease research § Research directions
- Neuroscience of ageing
