= Tamara Franklin =

Canadian Neuroscientist

Tamara Franklin is an associate professor in the Department of Psychology and Neuroscience at Dalhousie University. She obtained her Ph.D. at the Swiss Federal Institute of Technology and completed her postdoctoral fellowship in the Mouse Biology Unit at the European Molecular Biology Laboratories in Monterotondo. She was born in Montreal, Canada. Her neuroscience research focuses on the brain function required to drive social interactions, and the neural mechanisms responsible for social impairments in conditions such as Autism Spectrum Disorder and Alzheimer’s disease.

== Education ==
In 2003, Franklin received her Bachelor’s of Science in the Psychology and Neuroscience Program from Dalhousie University. She is a Board Member of the Canadian Association for Neuroscience and an Associate Editor of Journal for Neuroscience Research. She continued her education at this university and earned her Master’s of Science degree in the Department of Medical Neuroscience (formerly Department of Anatomy and Neurobiology). During her master’s degree, she focused her research on “environmental enrichment and the long term impact of environmental manipulation” in mice social behavior. Later, in 2009, at the Swiss Federal Institute of Technology, Franklin completed her Ph.D.

== Career ==
Franklin is currently an associate professor in the Department of Psychology and Neuroscience at Dalhousie University. In addition to her role as an educator, Franklin is involved in equity, diversity, and inclusion (EDI) work within universities and the neuroscience communities; at Dalhousie University, she has served on the Faculty of Science Equity Committee and has chaired the departmental Equity, Diversity, and Inclusion committee.

== Research ==
Franklin has published in peer-reviewed journals such as Nature Neuroscience. Her research focuses on how the brain generates appropriate social behaviors, and the neural mechanisms of social dysfunction related to diseases like Autism Spectrum Disorder and Alzheimer’s disease.

One of her studies focused on behavioral adaptation to social defeat in mice. This study defined a specific neural projection to the dorsal periaqueductal gray within a brainstem circuit by which the prefrontal cortex can control and adapt social defeat behavior.

Franklin has recently researched the epigenetic regulation of social hierarchy in mice to better understand the neural bases of dominant and subordinate behaviors. The study linked expression of HDAC2, associated with regulating synaptic plasticity genes related to learning and memory, with social status.

Dr. Franklin has studied how “repeated violent, competitive encounters drive changes in brain activity” to affect mice behavior in relation to the losing or winning status of the mice. She claims that these behaviors “can contribute to depression and/or anxiety.”

== Awards and honors ==
Franklin has received the following award:

2003 - Dr Carrie Best Scholarship

== Selected publications ==
- Franklin TB, Silva BA, Perova Z, Marrone L, Masferrer ME, Zhan Y, Kaplan A, Greetham L, Verrechia V, Halman A, Pagella S, Vyssotski AL, Illarionova A, Grinevich V, Branco T, Gross CT (January 9, 2017). "Prefrontal cortical control of a brainstem social behavior circuit". Nature Neuroscience. 20 (2), 260-270. Doi: 10.1038/nn.4470.
- Kosel F, Hamilton J, Harrison S, Godin V, Franklin TB (January 7, 2021). "Reduced social investigation and increased injurious behaviour in transgenic 5xFAD mice". Journal of Neuroscience Research. 99 (1), 209-222. doi:10.1002/jnr.24578.
- Kosel, F, Pelley, JMS, Franklin, TB (May 11, 2020). "Behavioural and psychological symptoms of dementia in mouse models of Alzheimer’s disease". Neuroscience and Biobehavioral Reviews 112: 634-647. doi:10.1016/j.neubiorev.2020.02.012
- Kosel F, Torres Munoz P, Yang JR, Wong AA, Franklin, TB (April 19, 2019). "Age-related changes in social behaviours in the 5xFAD mouse model of Alzheimer's disease". Behavioural Brain Research. 362, 160-172. doi:10.1016/j.bbr.2019.01.029.
- van Steenwyk G, Roszkowski M, Manuella F, Franklin TB, Mansuy IM (October 16, 2018). "Transgenerational inheritance of behavioral and metabolic effects of traumatic experiences in early postnatal life in mice: Evidence in the 4th generation". Environmental Epigenetics. 4 (2), dvy023. Doi: 10.1093/eep/dvy023.
- Spiteri Douglas, R., Hartley, M. R., Yang, J. R., & Franklin, T. B. (January 1, 2024). "Differential expression of Hdac2 in male and female mice of differing social status". Physiology & Behavior, 273, 114406. https://doi.org/10.1016/j.physbeh.2023.114406
- Torres Muñoz P, Franklin TB (August 26, 2022). "The anxiogenic effects of adolescent psychological stress in male and female mice". Behavioural Brain Research. 432, 113963. https://doi.org/10.1016/j.bbr.2022.113963
