= Mark Bear =

American neuroscientist

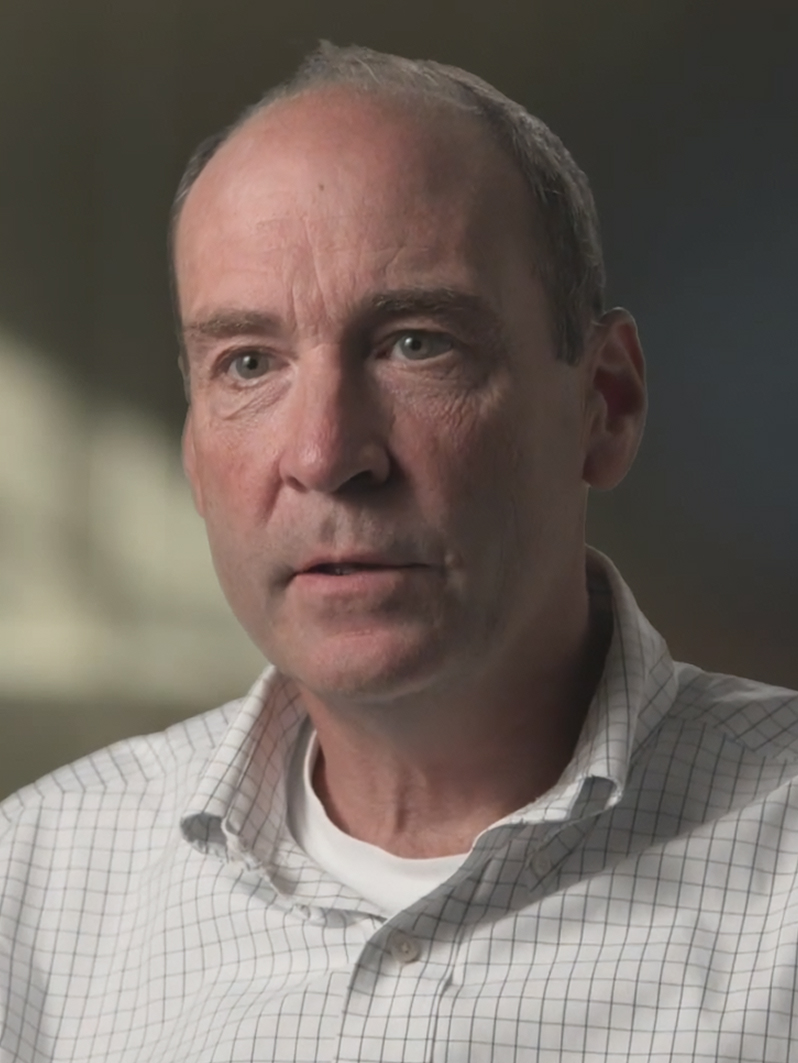
- Education: Duke University; Brown University
- Awards: National Academy of Medicine
- Scientific career
- Workplaces: Brown University (1985–2003); HHMI (1996–2015); MIT (2003–)

Mark Firman Bear is an American neuroscientist. He is currently the Picower Professor of Neuroscience at The Picower Institute for Learning and Memory at Massachusetts Institute of Technology. He is a former Howard Hughes Medical Institute Investigator; an Elected Fellow of the American Association for the Advancement of Science and the American Academy of Arts and Sciences; and a Member of the National Academy of Medicine.

== Education and career ==
Bear earned a B.Sc. degree from Duke University and received his doctorate in neurobiology at Brown University. As a postdoctoral fellow, he trained with Wolf Singer at the Max Planck Institute for Brain Research in Frankfurt, Germany, and with Nobel Laureate Leon Cooper at Brown.

Bear was the Sidney A. and Dorothy Doctors Fox Professor at Brown University's Alpert Medical School from 1996 to 2003, when he was appointed Picower Professor of Neuroscience at The Picower Institute for Learning and Memory in the Department of Brain and Cognitive Sciences at MIT. He subsequently served as Director of The Picower Institute from 2007 to 2009. Bear was an Investigator of the Howard Hughes Medical Institute from 1994 to 2015.

== Scientific focus ==
Bear's research focuses on the questions of how experience modifies the brain, and how this knowledge can be applied to overcome genetic or environmental adversity, with a special emphasis on amblyopia, autism, and fragile X syndrome. He has described the molecular mechanisms responsible for vision loss (amblyopia) caused by early life monocular deprivation, and uncovered a key pathophysiological basis for altered brain function in fragile X syndrome and autism. This work led to discovery of new approaches to correct these disorders in animal models. To advance these therapies into the clinic, Bear has been a scientific cofounder of several biotech companies, including Seaside Therapeutics, Allos Pharma, and Reboot Vision.

== Selected scientific discoveries ==
Bear's work has led to several significant contributions to science, which include:

- discovery of homosynaptic long-term depression
- the concept of metaplasticity as a means to maintain network homeostasis
- the molecular basis for amblyopia, a prevalent form of visual impairment, showing that the synaptic weakening is actively triggered by the noisy residual activity in the eye deprived of vision
- discovery of an essential synaptic mechanism for visual recognition memory
- formulation of the mGluR theory of fragile X and its experimental validation
- discovery that the GABA-B receptor agonist arbaclofen can reverse-related phenotypes in mouse models of the leading genetic causes of autism and intellectual disability
- demonstration that amblyopia can be reversed by “rebooting” the visual system

== Contributions to neuroscience education ==
Bear has received awards for teaching popular introductory neuroscience courses at Brown and MIT. He has mentored over 20 predoctoral and 25 postdoctoral trainees, many of whom are now distinguished independent investigators. With colleagues Barry Connors and Michael Paradiso, he co-authored the leading undergraduate introductory textbook in neuroscience, entitled Neuroscience: Exploring the Brain and now in its 5th edition. This book has introduced the field to hundreds of thousands of students worldwide over the lifetime of the title.

== Selected publications ==
- Bear, Mark F., Barry W. Connors, and Michael A. Paradiso, Neuroscience: Exploring the Brain. 5th Edition. Jones & Bartlett Learning, 2025.
- Stoppel LJ, Kazdoba TM, Schaffler MD, Preza AR, Heynen A, Crawley JN, Bear MF. R-Baclofen Reverses Cognitive Deficits and Improves Social Interactions in Two Lines of 16p11.2 Deletion Mice. Neuropsychopharmacology (2018)
- Stoppel LJ, Auerbach BD, Senter RK, Preza AR, Lefkowitz RJ, Bear MF. β-Arrestin2 Couples Metabotropic Glutamate Receptor 5 to Neuronal Protein Synthesis and Is a Potential Target to Treat Fragile X. Cell Rep. (2017)
- Fong MF, Mitchell DE, Duffy KR, Bear MF. Rapid recovery from the effects of early monocular deprivation is enabled by temporary inactivation of the retinas. Proc Natl Acad Sci U S A. (2016)
- Dölen G, Osterweil E, Rao BS, Smith GB, Auerbach BD, Chattarji S, Bear MF. Correction of fragile X syndrome in mice. Neuron (2007)
- Malenka, Robert C., and Mark F. Bear. "LTP and LTD: an embarrassment of riches." Neuron 44.1 (2004): 5-21.
- Bear, Mark F., Kimberly M. Huber, and Stephen T. Warren. "The mGluR theory of fragile X mental retardation." Trends in neurosciences 27.7 (2004): 370–377.
- Abraham, Wickliffe C., and Mark F. Bear. "Metaplasticity: the plasticity of synaptic plasticity." Trends in neurosciences 19.4 (1996): 126–130.
- Dudek, Serena M., and Mark F. Bear. "Homosynaptic long-term depression in area CA1 of hippocampus and effects of N-methyl-D-aspartate receptor blockade." Proceedings of the National Academy of Sciences 89.10 (1992): 4363–4367.
