= Troland Research Awards =

The Troland Research Awards are an annual prize given by the United States National Academy of Sciences to two researchers (preferably 45 years of age or younger) in recognition of psychological research on the relationship between consciousness and the physical world. The areas where these award funds are to be spent include but are not limited to areas of experimental psychology, the topics of sensation, perception, motivation, emotion, learning, memory, cognition, language, and action. The award preference is given to experimental work with a quantitative approach or experimental research seeking physiological explanations.

== Recipients ==
Source: NAS

- M. J. Crockett (2026) for pioneering contributions to a mechanistic theory of moral cognition.
- Jason D. Yeatman (2026) for advancing literacy understanding and improving evidence-based treatments for reading disorders.
- Evelina Fedorenko (2025) for groundbreaking contributions and insights into the language network in the human brain.
- Nicholas Turk-Browne (2025) for pioneering contributions advancing our understanding of learning and memory in the human brain.
- Christopher Harvey (2024) for pioneering work on neural circuits.
- Jennifer Trueblood (2024) for pioneering work on mathematical models of cognitive processing.
- Tim Buschman (2023) for groundbreaking contributions and insights into the neural mechanisms of cognitive control.
- Catherine Hartley (2023) for novel contributions to the understanding of the adolescent mind and brain.
- Roozbeh Kiani (2022) for seminal contributions to understanding visually-based decisions.
- Leah Somerville (2022) for pioneering research on how brain development shapes psychological functioning from childhood to adulthood.
- Michael J. Frank (2021) for groundbreaking discoveries in our understanding of learning, valuation, and cognitive control.
- Nicole C. Rust (2021) for fundamental contributions to the understanding of how the cortex makes use of complex visual information to guide intelligent behavior.
- Michael C. Frank (2020) for work revolutionizing our understanding of language acquisition by placing it in its social context.
- Nim Tottenham (2020) for innovative discoveries of critical windows of affective development during childhood and adolescence, their underlying neural basis at the circuit level and their disruption following early life stress.
- Adriana Galvan (2019)

For her experimental advances characterizing the neurobiological mechanisms underlying adaptive and risky adolescent behavior, elucidating theoretical models of adolescence and the impact of this research on decisions of juvenile justice.

- Tom Griffiths (2019)

For his pioneering work bringing the methods of Bayesian inference to bear on understanding a broad range of cognitive functions, from perception to language, decision making, reasoning, and cognitive control, and for bringing formal rigor to the notion of bounded rationality, explaining apparent irrationalities of behavior in rational terms.

- Josh McDermott (2018)

For groundbreaking research into how humans hear and interpret sound.

- Marlene Cohen (2018)

For her pioneering studies of how neurons in the brain process visual information.

- Tim Behrens (2017)

For his outstanding research into the neuroanatomical systems mediating learning and decision making.

- Sian Leah Beilock (2017)

For her fundamental contributions to our understanding of human skill learning and performance breakdowns in high-pressure and anxiety-provoking situations.

- David J. Freedman (2016)

For his innovative experimental and computational work revealing how neurons in cerebral cortex support the representation of visual categories.

- Geoffrey F. Woodman (2016)

For his artful blending of behavioral, electrophysiological and neurophysiological techniques in humans and nonhuman primates to reveal neural concomitants of attention, cognitive control and memory. His most recent work pairing transcranial electrical stimulation with error monitoring introduces an important new strategy for improving cognitive function in people with brain disorders.

- Lisa Feigenson (2015)

For her meticulous investigations of the origins and early development of representations of objects and numbers. Her research on cognition in infancy illuminates the foundations of young children's mathematical reasoning and learning.

- Yael Niv (2015)

For her studies at the confluence of theory and experiment that illuminate the behavioral and biological foundations of learning and decision-making.

- Ueli Rutishauser (2014)

For his innovative experimental and computational studies to understand human perception and memory.

- Rebecca Saxe (2014)

For discovering the part of the human brain specialized for understanding what other people are thinking.

- Asif A. Ghazanfar (2013)

For studies on the development and neural basis of primate communication that advance our understanding of human communication.

- Lori L. Holt (2013)

For studies advancing our understanding of the sensory and cognitive processes that are fundamental to the perception of speech.

- Jason P. Mitchell (2012)

For his insightful use of neuroimaging and behavioral methods to enrich our understanding of how people infer the thoughts, feelings, and opinions of others.

- Laura Schulz (2012)

For her fundamental contributions to our understanding of how children develop knowledge of the physical and social world.

- Elizabeth A. Buffalo (2011)

For innovative, multidisciplinary study of the hippocampus and the neural basis of memory.

- Joshua B. Tenenbaum (2011)

For formulating a groundbreaking new Bayesian model of human inductive learning and for using this model to generate innovative empirical studies of human perception, language, and reasoning.

- Michael J. Kahana (2010)

For innovative experimental, theoretical, and computational work leading to new insights regarding the dynamics of human episodic memory.

- Frank Tong (2010)

For pioneering the use of neural decoding techniques to explore mechanisms in the human brain mediating perception, attention, and object recognition.

- Tirin Moore (2009)

For fundamental and insightful contributions to our understanding of the neuronal mechanisms that control directed visual attention.

- Andrew J. Oxenham (2009)

For profound and rigorous contributions to our understanding of the relationship between auditory perception and its underlying physiological mechanisms.

- Miguel P. Eckstein (2008)

For sophisticated theoretical analysis and modeling that address fundamental issues in perception and cognition and their application to the practical problems of medical imaging.

- Isabel Gauthier (2008)

For seminal experiments on the role of visual expertise in the recognition of complex objects including faces and for exploration of brain areas activated by this recognition.

- Randy Buckner (2007)

For substantive contributions to understandings of the neural mechanisms of memory formation and retrieval.

- Pawan Sinha (2007)

For elucidating how humans learn to recognize visual objects, and for developing computational models of the mechanisms that mediate this learning.

- Marvin M. Chun (2006)

For creative use of behavioral, brain-imaging, and neuropsychological evidence to elucidate the interplay of conscious and unconscious processes in perception, memory, and learning.

- Frederick M. Rieke (2006)

For experimental and theoretical analyses of information coding in the central nervous system and its relation to perception.

- Gregory C. DeAngelis (2005)

For his fundamental contributions to understanding the neural mechanisms underlying stereoscopic vision: the discovery of a disparity mechanism and how it contributes to depth perception.

- Jacob Feldman (2005)

For his advancement of mathematical and computational approaches to perceptual organization in human vision and human concept learning.

- Robert L. Goldstone (2004)

For novel experimental analyses and elegant modeling that show how perceptual learning dynamically adjusts dimensions and boundaries of categories and concepts in human thought.

- Wendy A. Suzuki (2004)

For her fundamental work on the neuroanatomy, physiology, and function of brain structures important for memory.

- David C. Plaut (2003)

For his penetrating computational analyses of reading, language, and other aspects of cognition, which elucidate normal function and the consequences of brain injury.

- Michael J. Tarr (2003)

For his empirical and theoretical investigations of object recognition and for demonstrating the importance of expertise in organizing brain areas for faces and other objects.

- David J. Heeger (2002)

For his groundbreaking contributions to our understanding of the relation between perceptual experience and neural activity in visual cortex, using neuroimaging and computational methods.

- John K. Kruschke (2002)

For deep insights and empirical evaluations concerning concept formation and attention in learning and rigorous formalization of the underlying psychological principles in connectionist frameworks.

- Steven J. Luck (2001)

For his pathbreaking behavioral, psychophysical, and physiological studies of attention and visual memory.

- Karen Wynn (2001)

For her pioneering research on the foundations of quantitative and mathematical thinking in infants and young children.

- Elizabeth Gould (2000)

For her discoveries about neurogenesis in adult mammals and its modulation by hormones, neurotransmitters, and experience, which have radically altered our ideas regarding brain function.

- Earl K. Miller (2000)

For his pioneering research on working memory and its neurobiological basis in the prefrontal cortex.

- Nancy G. Kanwisher (1999)

For her innovative research on visual attention, awareness, and imagery, including the characterization of a face perception module and discovery of a place encoding module.

- Harold E. Pashler (1999)

For his many experimental breakthroughs in the study of spatial attention and central executive control and for his insightful theoretical analysis of human cognitive architecture.

- Virginia M. Richards (1998)

For her contributions to auditory perception, especially to the understanding of the envelope and energy cues that contribute to detecting signals in noise.

- Jeffrey D. Schall (1998)

For his contributions to our understanding of neural mechanisms of visual selective attention, the control of voluntary movements, and response time.

- Richard Ivry (1997)

For his innovative work with normal humans and neurological patients, showing the importance of the cerebellum for computations related to sensory and motor timing.

- Keith R. Kluender (1997)

For his empirical and theoretical contributions to our understanding of the perception of speech.

- Joseph E. Steinmetz (1996)

For his pioneering anatomical, physiological, and behavioral studies that identify pathways in the brain, subserving a basic form of learning, associating conditioned and unconditioned stimuli.

- Steven G. Yantis (1996)

For his insightful research on visual attention and perception, especially his studies on the capture and the interactions between attention and perceptual organization.

- Michael S. Fanselow (1995)

For his ingenious analysis of the mechanisms that enable stimuli to acquire the ability to produce fear and how fear translates into specifics behaviors.

- Robert M. Nosofsky (1995)

For his creative synthesis of information processing models and techniques of psychological measurement in the combined theoretical and experimental analysis of human categorization learning.

- Donald D. Hoffman (1994)

For advancing the formal and empirical study of human visual perception and for developing a general theoretical framework for the analysis of perceptual inference.

- David G. Lavond (1994)

For his pioneering application of the method of reversible cooling inactivation of regions of neural tissue to localize a memory trace in the mammalian brain.

- Steven Pinker (1993)

For his significant contributions to the fields of visual perception and the acquisition and evolutionary basis of language.

- Martha Farah (1992)

For her rigorous empirical and theoretical analysis of visual cognition, in which understanding of normal function and analysis of neurological deficits illuminate and strengthen one another.

- Daniel L. Schacter (1991)

For his investigations of the amnesic syndrome and of explicit versus implicit memory, major steps toward a neuro-psychological analysis of the functions of consciousness.

- Robert Desimone (1990)

For his outstanding work on the cortical and subcortical neuronal mechanisms underlying visual perception and attention.

- John T. Cacioppo (1989)

For his contributions to understanding the psychophysiological correlates of attitudes, cognition, and emotions, and for his use of non-invasive physiological measures to resolve basic theoretical questions regarding psychological processes.

- Eric I. Knudsen (1988)

For his elegant analysis—integrating behavior, neurophysiology, and neuroanatomy—which elucidated the role of experience in the development of directional hearing in the owl.

- Laurence T. Maloney and Brian A. Wandell (1987)

For their elegant account of how we preserve the inherent colors of surfaces despite wide variations in illumination, and of Wandell's other fundamental investigations of color vision.

- Roger Ratcliff (1986)

For his effectively combined mathematical and experimental analyses of human information processing.

- Keith D. White (1985)

For his psychophysical studies on visual guidance and discrimination through the selective perception of pattern, color, and movement.

- Edward N. Pugh (1984)

For his distinguished, quantitative psychophysical work on mechanisms of color adaptation and to encourage his physiological work on mechanisms of receptor transduction and sensitivity control.

== See also ==
- Troland
- Leonard T. Troland
- National Academy of Sciences
- List of awards named after people
- List of psychology awards
