= William Marslen-Wilson =

William Marslen-Wilson FBA, FAE
- Education: MIT
- Scientific career
- Institutions: University of Chicago; Max Planck Institute for Psycholinguistics; Birkbeck College, London; University of Cambridge
- Thesis: Speech shadowing and speech perception (1973)
- Doctoral advisor: Mary C. Potter

Professor William D. Marslen-Wilson FBA, FAE (born 1945) is a neuroscientist.

Marslen-Wilson obtained his PhD from Massachusetts Institute of Technology in 1973. He subsequently worked as an assistant professor at the University of Chicago.

In 1977, he took up a post in Nijmegen, the Netherlands at the Max Planck Institute for Psycholinguistics. This was followed by stints at the Department of Experimental Psychology Cambridge; as Director of the Max Planck Institute for Psycholinguistics; as a senior scientist at the Medical Research Council's Applied Psychology Unit, and as Professor of Psychology at Birkbeck College, London.

He returned to the Applied Psychology Unit as director from 1997 to 2010, during which time it changed name, to become the Cognition and Brain Sciences Unit.

From 2014-2016, he sat on the editorial board of the journal Philosophical Transactions of the Royal Society B.

As of June 2017, he is Honorary Professor of Language and Cognition at the University of Cambridge.
