= Andrew Coburn =

Andrew Coburn may refer to:

- Andrew Coburn (author) (1932–2018)
- Andrew Coburn (catastrophe modeller) (born 1956), catastrophe modeller
