= Molyneux's problem =

Philosophical thought experiment

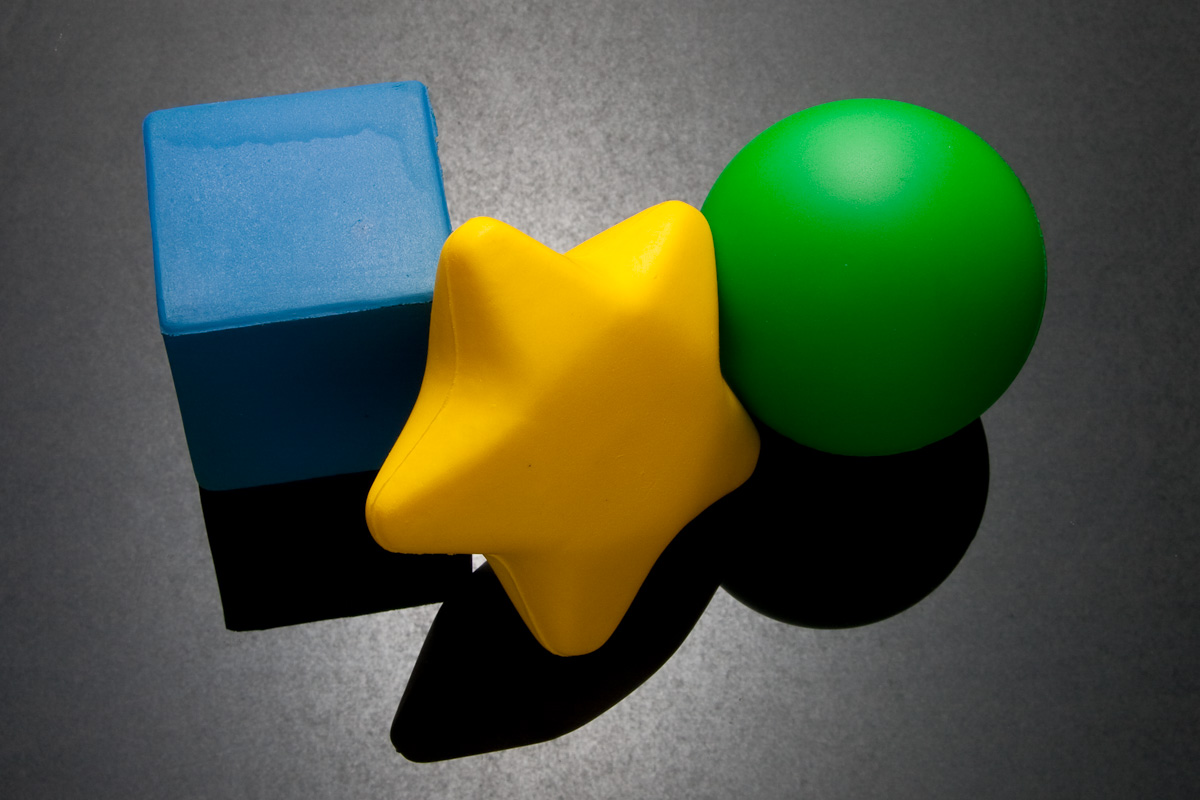
Different shaped stress balls, including a cube, a star, and a sphere

Molyneux's problem is a thought experiment in philosophy concerning immediate recovery from blindness. It was first formulated by William Molyneux, and notably referenced in John Locke's An Essay Concerning Human Understanding (1689). The problem can be stated in brief: "if a man born blind can feel the differences between shapes such as spheres and cubes, could he, if given the ability to see, distinguish those objects by sight alone, in reference to the tactile schemata he already possessed?"

== Molyneux and Locke ==
The question was originally posed to Locke by philosopher William Molyneux, whose wife was blind. It is known from the report of it in Locke's Essay Concerning Human Understanding, which is reproduced here:

I shall here insert a problem of that very ingenious and studious promoter of real knowledge, the learned and worthy Mr. Molineux, which he was pleased to send me in a letter some months since; and it is this:—"Suppose a man born blind, and now adult, and taught by his touch to distinguish between a cube and a sphere of the same metal, and nighly of the same bigness, so as to tell, when he felt one and the other, which is the cube, which the sphere. Suppose then the cube and sphere placed on a table, and the blind man be made to see: quaere, whether by his sight, before he touched them, he could now distinguish and tell which is the globe, which the cube?" To which the acute and judicious proposer answers, "Not. For, though he has obtained the experience of how a globe, how a cube affects his touch, yet he has not yet obtained the experience, that what affects his touch so or so, must affect his sight so or so; or that a protuberant angle in the cube, that pressed his hand unequally, shall appear to his eye as it does in the cube."—I agree with this thinking gentleman, whom I am proud to call my friend, in his answer to this problem; and am of opinion that the blind man, at first sight, would not be able with certainty to say which was the globe, which the cube, whilst he only saw them; though he could unerringly name them by his touch, and certainly distinguish them by the difference of their figures felt.

== Before Locke ==
A similar problem was also addressed earlier in the 12th century by Ibn Tufail (Abubacer), in his philosophical novel, Hayy ibn Yaqdhan (Philosophus Autodidactus). This version focused on colors rather than shapes, and gave the opposite solution:

If you want a comparison that will make you clearly grasp the difference between the perception, such as it is understood by that sect [the Sufis] and the perception as others understand it, imagine a person born blind, endowed however with a happy natural temperament, with a lively and firm intelligence, a sure memory, a straight sprite, who grew up from the time he was an infant in a city where he never stopped learning, by means of the senses he did dispose of, to know the inhabitants individually, the numerous species of beings, living as well as non-living, there, the streets and sidestreets, the houses, the steps, in such a manner as to be able to cross the city without a guide, and to recognize immediately those he met; the colors alone would not be known to him except by the names they bore, and by certain definitions that designated them. Suppose that he had arrived at this point and suddenly, his eyes were opened, he recovered his view, and he crosses the entire city, making a tour of it. He would find no object different from the idea he had made of it; he would encounter nothing he didn't recognize, he would find the colors conformable to the descriptions of them that had been given to him; and in this there would only be two new important things for him, one the consequence of the other: a clarity, a greater brightness, and a great voluptuousness.

== After Locke ==
=== Early modern period ===
In 1709, in §95 of An Essay Towards a New Theory of Vision, George Berkeley also concluded that there was no necessary connection between a tactile world and a sight world—that a connection between them could be established only on the basis of experience.

Leibniz (German philosopher, 1646–1716) also discussed this problem, but derived a different answer. He suggested that the two sets of experience have one element in common, that is, extension. Hence it is possible to infer from one type of idea to another.

Scottish philosopher Thomas Reid offered a conditional answer: newly sighted people could immediately recognize two-dimensional shapes like squares and circles, since these would appear the same whether seen or touched. However, three-dimensional objects like cubes and spheres would look different from how they felt. Reid argued that a "blind geometer" could still identify 3D shapes by using mathematical reasoning to calculate which visible forms correspond to familiar tactile ones.

In 1749, Denis Diderot wrote Letter on the blind for the benefit of those who see as a criticism of our knowledge of ultimate reality.

=== Current research on human vision ===
One reason that Molyneux's Problem could be posed in the first place is the extreme dearth of human subjects who gain vision after extended congenital blindness. In 1971, Alberto Valvo estimated that fewer than twenty cases have been known in the last 1000 years.

In 2003, Pawan Sinha, a professor at the Massachusetts Institute of Technology, set up a program in the framework of the Project Prakash and eventually had the opportunity to find five individuals who satisfied the requirements for an experiment aimed at answering Molyneux's question. Prior to treatment, the subjects (aged 8 to 17) were only able to discriminate between light and dark, with two of them also being able to determine the direction of a bright light. The surgical treatments took place between 2007 and 2010, and quickly brought the relevant subject from total congenital blindness to fully seeing. A carefully designed test was submitted to each subject within the next 48 hours. Based on its result, the experimenters concluded that the answer to Molyneux's problem is, in short, "no". Although after restoration of sight, the subjects could distinguish between objects visually almost as effectively as they would do by touch alone, they were unable to form the connection between an object perceived using the two different senses. The correlation was barely better than if the subjects had guessed. They had no innate ability to transfer their tactile shape knowledge to the visual domain. However, the experimenters could test three of the five subjects on later dates (5 days, 7 days, and 5 months after, respectively) and found that the performance in the touch-to-vision case improved significantly, reaching 80–90%.

Ostrovsky, et al., in 2006, studied a woman who gained sight at the age of 12 when she underwent surgery for dense bilateral congenital cataracts. They report that the subject could recognize family members by sight six months after surgery, but took up to a year to recognize most household objects purely by sight.

Regarding Molyneux's problem, the authors Asif A. Ghazanfar & Hjalmar K. Turesson (2008) have recently noted that there are not separate brain processes for motor outputs and individual sensory modalities, but rather that the brain uses all available context-specific information to act – that is, all information associated with a specific action. They suggest that this makes Molyneux's problem into an ill-posed question, from a neuroscientific perspective, since Molyneux does not suggest an action to be done with the cube and the globe.

Researchers have also explored Molyneux's question using sensory substitution devices that convert visual information into other sensory formats. For example, the Brainport device transfers visual information from a camera to electrical patterns felt on the tongue. Blind users can learn to recognize objects at a distance through these tongue sensations. Interestingly, brain scans show that when congenitally blind people use these devices, the visual processing areas of their brain become active but this doesn't happen when sighted people use the same device. This suggests the blind brain can adapt to process "visual" information through touch, offering a modern technological approach to testing cross-sensory recognition.

=== Research on chicken vision ===
In 2024, chickens were reared from incubation and hatching in total darkness, then exposed in said darkness to objects of either smooth or bumpy textures for 24 hours. They were then tested on visual recognition of the objects as they first experienced light. Upon first sight, chicks that touched the smooth objects approached the smooth objects much more often than chicks that touched bumpy objects did.

== See also ==
- Eşref Armağan
- Mike May (skier)
- Mary's room
