= Laura Schulz =

American psychologist

- Education: University of Michigan (BA); University of California, Berkeley (MA, PhD)
- Relatives: Kathryn Schulz (sister)
- Website: bcs.mit.edu/laura-schulz

Laura E. Schulz is an American psychologist who is professor of cognitive science at the brain and cognitive sciences department of the Massachusetts Institute of Technology (MIT). She is the principal investigator of the Early Childhood Cognition Lab at MIT. Schulz is known for her work on the early childhood development of cognition, causal inference, discovery, and learning.

== Education ==
Schulz received a Bachelor of Arts with a major in philosophy from the University of Michigan in 1992. She received a Master of Arts and a Doctor of Philosophy, both in psychology, from the University of California, Berkeley in 2002 and 2004, respectively.

== Career ==
While at Berkeley, she worked closely with Alison Gopnik, researching computational models of cognition. In 2005, Schulz joined the faculty at the Massachusetts Institute of Technology (MIT). There, alongside Pawan Sinha, she runs the post-baccalaureate Research Scholars Program in Brain and Cognitive Sciences, working to prepare disadvantaged students for graduate school.

Schulz is the principal investigator of the Early Childhood Cognition Lab at MIT, studying learning in early childhood.

== Research ==
Schulz's research focuses on children's cognition, specifically how children begin to form their world-views from the facets of information they obtain every day. Her work focuses on three main topics within children cognition. One of the topics is how children process the information they've gained in order to better infer, interact, and explain the world around them. Another topic is on the factors that allows children express curiosity and explore their environment, which also allows them to strengthen their cognition. Finally, how the information gained from the previous points will interact with one another to form their social cognition and ultimately build their sense of self and their interactions with others. Her data and observations come from two laboratories, one at the Boston Children's Museum and the other at the Discovery Center in the Museum of Science, Boston. At these laboratories she uses infant-looking time methods and free play paradigms, as well as other methods, to study babies and children. She chooses to observe these subjects in particular, because in order to understand the origins of knowledge and fundamental principles of learning in humans, one must start at the beginning when babies have limited prior knowledge.

As of 2020, she has 95 publications including articles, data, and papers, 20 of which were completed during her time at The Center for Brains, Minds and Machines (CBMM) at MIT. In March 2015 she gave a TED talk called "The surprisingly logical minds of babies", which has since had almost 2 million views.

== Personal life ==
Schulz is the daughter of teacher Margot Schulz and lawyer Isaac Schulz. Her sister, Kathryn Schulz, is a staff writer for The New Yorker. She is married to Sue Kaufman and has four children: Henry Philofsky, MJ Kaufman, Rachel Novick, and Adele Kaufman-Schulz.

== Awards and recognition ==
- American Psychological Association Distinguished Scientific Award for Early Career Contribution to Psychology, 2014
- MIT MacVicar Faculty Fellow, 2013
- National Academy of Sciences, Troland Research Award, 2012
- Society for Research in Child Development, Award for Early Career Research Contributions, 2011
- National Academy of Sciences, Kavli Fellow, 2011
- MIT Brain and Cognitive Science Award Angus MacDonald Award for Excellence in Undergraduate Teaching, 2011
- MIT Sigma Xi, Invited Speaker, 2011
- Marr Prize, Cognitive Science Society (student author: Hyowon Gweon), 2010
- NSF Presidential Early Career Award for Scientists and Engineers, 2009
- John Merck Scholars Foundation Award, 2009
- Class of 1943 MIT Career Development Professorship, 2009
- MIT Brain and Cognitive Science Award for Excellence in Undergraduate Advising, 2009
- NSF Faculty Early Career Development award, 2007
- MIT School of Science Prize for Excellence in Undergraduate Teaching, 2007
- Marr Prize, Cognitive Science Society (student author: Elizabeth Bonawitz), 2006
- American Association of University Women, American Dissertation Fellowship, 2004
- National Science Foundation Graduate Research Fellowship Award, 2001
- Hewlett Foundation Graduate Fellowship Award, 2000
