= Nim Tottenham =

American developmental psychologist

- Occupation: Professor of Psychology
- Awards: APA Award for Distinguished Scientific Early Career Contributions to Psychology (2015)

Academic background
- Education: Barnard College; University of Minnesota

Academic work
- Institutions: Columbia University

Nim Tottenham is a professor of psychology at Columbia University, where she leads the Developmental Affective Neuroscience Laboratory. Her research highlighted fundamental changes in amygdala-prefrontal cortex circuitry across childhood and adolescence and the influential role of early experiences on the developmental trajectories of these circuits.

Tottenham received the National Academy of Sciences Troland Research Award in 2020 for "her innovative discoveries of critical windows of affective development during childhood and adolescence, their underlying neural basis at the circuit level and their disruption following early life stress." She is a Fellow of the Association for Psychological Science and of the Society for Experimental Psychologists. Her scientific contributions in developmental neuroscience have also been recognized by the American Psychological Association's Distinguished Scientific Award for Early Career Contribution to Psychology (2015), the Flux Award (2022), and the American Psychosomatic Society (2020).

== Biography ==
Tottenham attended the Hopkins School, a private school in New Haven, Connecticut. Her teachers at Hopkins championed her to partake in laboratory experiences at nearby Yale University. At Yale, she learned about genetic signaling in drosophila in Spyros Artavanis-Tsakonas' lab and the role of neuropeptides in parental cognitions of their newborns in James Leckman's lab. She attended Barnard College, where she majored in Psychology and earned her B.A. in 1996. Following her graduation, she worked as a research assistant in the laboratory of Mary Jane Rotheram-Borus. She helped examine the development of children and adolescents in New York City whose parents were living with or had died from HIV-related illness. Working on these projects influenced her interest in early life experiences on emotional development.

She attended graduate school at the University of Minnesota and obtained a joint Ph.D. in Child Psychology and Neuroscience in 2005, under the supervision of Charles Nelson and Megan Gunnar. Chuck and Tottenham developed a face emotion stimulus set that is still widely used by colleagues. Her dissertation was titled The Development of Face Perception & Facial Expression Processing: Childhood to Young Adulthood. She also spent one summer training at the University of Pittsburgh. Here she was introduced to the study of psychopathology during the adolescent period under the mentorship of Ron Dahl.

Tottenham received postdoctoral training under the supervision of B.J. Casey from the Sackler Institute for Developmental Psychobiology at Weill Cornell Medical College in 2006. Casey was renowned for her work in developmental cognitive neuroscience and for performing fMRI studies on cognitive development in young children. She was invited by Casey to collaborate on a research project examining brain development following early parental deprivation. The duo continues to work on a regular basis.

During her time as an assistant professor at the University of California, Los Angeles Psychology Department in 2010, Tottenham received a National Institute of Mental Health Biobehavioral Research Award for Innovative New Scientists (BRAINS) to examine developmental change in amygdala-prefrontal cortex circuitry under normal conditions as well as following early adversity.

In 2017, Tottenham was selected to be the featured presenter for the Irene Jakob Memorial Lecture series, which was established at the University of Pittsburgh in honor of the late Irene Jakab, a psychiatrist and humanist who had achieved prominence for her use of art therapy in the diagnosis and treatment of learning disabilities and mental illness.

== Research ==
Tottenham studies the critical windows that affect how the brain develops. Her lab at Columbia uses various methods to understand the development of neural circuits that dictate behavior through childhood and adolescence and the effects of early-life caregiving and stress have on brain development. Tottenham found that children who spent extended amounts of time in institutionalized care developed an abnormal frontolimbic circuitry, both functionally and structurally, which reduced their ability to maintain eye contact and caused anxiety symptoms.

One of her most cited works includes The NimStim set of facial expressions: Judgments from untrained research participants. The NimStim Set of facial Expressions is a broad dataset comprising 672 images of unnaturally posed photographs by 43 professional actors. It is widely known in the literature, especially in the field of working memory, self-regulation, and even in the treatment of clinical disorders such as schizophrenia.

She is currently exploring the longitudinal development of the amygdala and its cortical connections, the impact of early life stress on brain development, and how children learn to respond to emotional or frustrating events from their parents.

== Representative publications ==
- Casey, B. J., Tottenham, N., Liston, C., & Durston, S. (2005). Imaging the developing brain: what have we learned about cognitive development?. Trends in Cognitive Sciences, 9(3), 104–110.
- Hare, T. A., Tottenham, N., Galvan, A., Voss, H. U., Glover, G. H., & Casey, B. (2008). Biological substrates of emotional reactivity and regulation in adolescence during an emotional go-nogo task. Biological Psychiatry, 63(10), 927–934.
- Durston, S., Tottenham, N. T., Thomas, K. M., Davidson, M. C., Eigsti, I. M., Yang, Y., ... & Casey, B. J. (2003). Differential patterns of striatal activation in young children with and without ADHD. Biological Psychiatry, 53(10), 871–878.
- Tottenham, N., Hare, T. A., Quinn, B. T., McCarry, T. W., Nurse, M., Gilhooly, T., ... & Casey, B. (2010). Prolonged institutional rearing is associated with atypically large amygdala volume and difficulties in emotion regulation. Developmental Science, 13(1), 46–61.
- Tottenham, N., Tanaka, J. W., Leon, A. C., McCarry, T., Nurse, M., Hare, T. A., ... & Nelson, C. (2009). The NimStim set of facial expressions: judgments from untrained research participants. Psychiatry Research, 168(3), 242–249.
