= Robert Goldstone =

American psychologist

- Title: Distinguished Professor and Chancellor's Professor

Academic background
- Education: Oberlin College (BA); University of Illinois Urbana-Champaign (MA); University of Michigan (PhD)

Academic work
- Discipline: Cognitive Science
- Sub-discipline: Cognitive Psychology
- Institutions: Indiana University
- Main interests: Concept learning Perceptual learning Collective behavior Neural networks Knowledge representation Visual cognition Pattern recognition

Robert Goldstone is a Distinguished Professor of psychology and cognitive science at Indiana University in Bloomington, Indiana. His research interests include concept learning and representation, perceptual learning, collective behavior, and computational modeling of human cognition. He has developed and empirically tested neural network models that simultaneously learn new perceptual and conceptual representations, with the learned concepts both affecting and being affected by perception. He has also developed computational models of how groups of people compete for resources, cooperate to solve problems, exchange information and innovations, and form coalitions.

== Biography ==
Goldstone earned his PhD from the University of Michigan, Ann Arbor. He was awarded two American Psychological Association Young Investigator awards in 1995 for articles appearing in Journal of Experimental Psychology, the 1996 Chase Memorial Award for Outstanding Young Researcher in Cognitive Science, a 1997 James McKeen Cattell Sabbatical Award, the 2000 APA Distinguished Scientific Award for Early Career Contribution to Psychology in the area of Cognition and Human Learning, a 2004 Troland Research Award from the National Academy of Sciences, and the 2024 Howard Crosby Warren Medal for Outstanding Achievement in Experimental Psychology from the Society of Experimental Psychologists. He was the editor of Cognitive Science from 2001 to 2005, and associate editor of Psychonomic Bulletin & Review from 1998 to 2000. He was elected as a fellow of the Society of Experimental Psychologists in 2004, a fellow of Cognitive Science Society in 2006, and a fellow of the American Academy of Arts and Sciences in 2016. He was Director of the Indiana University Cognitive Science Program from 2006 to 2011. Since 2020, he is the executive editor of Current Directions in Psychological Science.

He is married to the computer scientist, Katy Börner.
