= Lisa Feigenson =

Psychologist

- Occupations: Professor of Psychological and Brain Sciences
- Spouse: Justin Halberda
- Awards: 2015 National Academy of Sciences Troland Research Award 2010 Boyd McCandless Early Career Award from the American Psychological Association 2007 James S. McDonnell Foundation Scholar Award

Academic background
- Education: Cornell University, New York University

Lisa Feigenson is a Professor of Psychological and Brain Sciences at Johns Hopkins University and co-director of the Johns Hopkins University Laboratory for Child Development. Feigenson is known for her research on the development of numerical abilities, working memory, and early learning. She has served on the editorial board of Cognition and the Journal of Experimental Psychology: General.

== Awards ==
Feigenson is the recipient of the 2007 James S. McDonnell Foundation Scholar Award, 2010 Boyd McCandless Early Career Award from the American Psychological Association, and the 2015 Troland Research Award from the National Academy of Sciences.

== Biography ==
Feigenson received her Bachelor of Arts in psychology in 1997 at Cornell University under the tutelage of Elizabeth Spelke. She then pursued a doctoral degree in Cognitive Psychology at New York University and graduated in 2003, under the advisement of Susan Carey. Feigenson was a visiting graduate student fellow at the Department of Psychology at Harvard University from 2001 to 2003. She then became a postdoctoral fellow at Laboratoire de Sciences Cognitives et Psycholinguistique in Ecole Normale Supérieure (CNRS) in France.

Feigenson joined the Department of Psychological and Brain Sciences at Johns Hopkins University in 2004. She worked as an assistant professor from 2004 to 2010, Associate Professor from 2010 to 2014, and was appointed as a professor in 2014. She currently has a joint appoint in the Department of Cognitive Science. While at Johns Hopkins she received the 2011 Dean's Award for Excellence in Scholarship, and the 2016 Dean's Award for Excellence in Teaching and Service. In 2015 she became the Director of Graduate Studies at Department of Psychological and Brain Sciences.

Feigenson's research has received funding from organizations including the National Institute of Health, National Science Foundation, and the Overdeck Family Foundation. Her work has appeared in Science, Nature, and the Proceedings of the National Academy of Sciences.

== Research ==
Feigenson's research explores the fundamental processes of human cognition and memory using infants and young children to test the limitations of theories related to the understanding of numbers. Many of her studies are related to numerical cognition, object-based attention, and short-term memory. She primarily employs behavioural methods in her research.

One of Feigenson's studies involving a choice task with ten- and twelve-month-old infants examined how infants understand the concept of more and less. In this study, Feigenson concluded that these infants pay more attention to the total volume, or the surface area, of objects instead of viewing items individually. Feigenson watched infants crawl towards two containers containing crackers and choose crackers from one of the containers. She observed that infants tend to choose the container with more crackers or crackers with the larger surface area. Her study supports the hypothesis that infants are more likely to rely on object-file representations than one-to-one correspondence between the object files.

Feigenson's study involving approximate number sense suggests that there is a relationship between early sense of number and later mathematical ability. In this study, she gave three- to five-year-old children a task that did not require symbol use or arithmetic calculation, while also testing their math ability and vocabulary size. Feigenson found a correlation between children's approximate number sense and their mathematical ability even after controlling for children's vocabulary size and math ability before they received formal math education.

In another study, Feigenson examined the limits of infants' quantification of small object arrays, using a four-object array to examine how infants represent information. The study supports the three-item limit of parallel representation where infants tend to fail to discriminate arrays with greater than three items. There is an emphasis that infants depend on object-based attention and short-term memory to represent small numbers of objects. Feigenson concluded that the infants were knowledgeable about the array – realizing that the cracker exists, the cracker-material, and the size of the individual objects within the array – despite failing to represent the quantity "four".

== Representative publications ==
- Feigenson, L., & Carey, S. (2003). Tracking individuals via object‐files: evidence from infants’ manual search. Developmental Science, 6(5), 568–584.
- Feigenson, L., Carey, S., & Hauser, M. (2002). The representations underlying infants' choice of more: Object files versus analog magnitudes. Psychological Science, 13(2), 150–156.
- Feigenson, L., Carey, S., & Spelke, E. (2002). Infants’ discrimination of number vs. continuous extent. Cognitive Psychology, 44, 33–66.
- Feigenson, L., Dehaene, S., & Spelke, E. (2004). Core systems of number. Trends in Cognitive Sciences, 8(7), 307–314.
- Feigenson, L., Libertus, M. E., & Halberda, J. (2013). Links between the intuitive sense of number and formal mathematics ability. Child Development Perspectives, 7(2), 74–79.
- Halberda, J., & Feigenson, L. (2008). Developmental change in the acuity of the "Number Sense": The Approximate Number System in 3-, 4-, 5-, and 6-year-olds and adults. Developmental Psychology, 44(5), 1457–1465.
