= Rapid serial visual presentation =

Scientific method for studying the speed of visual processing

Rapid serial visual presentation (RSVP) is a scientific method for studying the timing of vision. In RSVP, a sequence of stimuli is shown to an observer at one location in their visual field. The observer is instructed to report one of these stimuli – the target – which has a feature that differentiates it from the rest of the stream. For instance, observers may see a sequence of stimuli consisting of gray letters with the exception of one red letter. They are told to report the red letter. People make errors in this task in the form of reports of stimuli that occurred before or after the target. The position in time of the letter they report, relative to the target, is an estimate of the timing of visual selection on that trial.

The term, and methodologies to study it, was first introduced by Mary C. Potter.

== Peripheral reading ==
Peripheral reading is vital to those suffering from central field loss, which is most commonly seen in the elderly. Factors that might limit one's peripheral reading rate include acuity, crowding, and eye movements. Many find difficulty making the correct eye movements for peripheral reading, but the dependence on eye movements can be minimized through the presentation format of RSVP.

The term "rapid serial visual presentation" is also used in information visualization to describe a computer interface technique proposed in 2002 by Robert Spence, in which a collection of images is presented sequentially and rapidly to help find an image of interest.

== Use in speed reading ==
Rapid serial visual presentation (RSVP) has been adapted as a method to increase the apparent speed of reading by presenting words (or short word groups) sequentially at a single, fixed location so that the reader does not need to make saccadic eye movements. Proponents of RSVP-based readers claim that removing the need for eye movements allows much higher words-per-minute rates than conventional reading.

In applied contexts, a number of commercial and experimental "one-word-at-a-time" readers (often referred to generically as Spritz-style readers) have been developed for mobile devices and e-readers. These apps allow users to set a high presentation rate and thereby read text more quickly than with ordinary left-to-right scanning. However, empirical studies testing such RSVP reading interfaces report mixed outcomes: while RSVP can increase measured reading speed, several experiments have observed reduced literal comprehension and increased visual fatigue at high presentation rates, and readers lose parafoveal preview and the ability to make regressions (re-reads), which can harm some types of comprehension.

RSVP also serves as a training and rehabilitation tool: studies that use RSVP in training protocols have reported substantial improvements in RSVP-measured reading speed (particularly in peripheral vision), suggesting potential benefits for people with central-field loss when combined with appropriate perceptual training.

== See also ==
- Attentional blink
