= Leonard T. Troland =

American physicist and psychologist

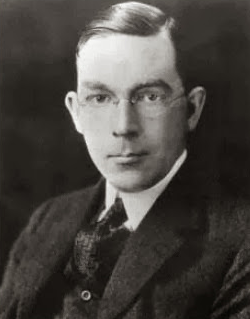
- Born: April 26, 1889; Norwich, Connecticut
- Died: May 1932 (aged 43)
- Scientific career
- Fields: Physics, psychology

Leonard Thompson Troland (26 April 1889– 27 May 1932) was an American physicist, psychologist and psychical researcher. A specialist on the perception of colors, he became chief engineer of Technicolor Corporation. Troland proposed that genes originated from enzyme-like autocatalysts, calling them "genetic enzymes" and that the earliest life forms were purely auto-catalytic substance.

== Life and work ==
Troland was born in Norwich, Connecticut. He graduated in 1912 from the Massachusetts Institute of Technology with a degree in biochemistry. He then studied psychology at Harvard University, where he obtained a Ph.D. in 1915 under Hugo Münsterberg. He also worked on book on physics for non physicists, The Nature of Matter and Electricity (1917), with Daniel Comstock. He worked for a year as a Harvard Travelling (Sheldon) fellow at the General Electric Nela research lab. During World War I, he worked on acoustic devices to detect submarines. He served as a member of committees of the National Research Council on vision and aviation psychology. In 1922 he wrote a book, The Present Status of Visual Science. At Harvard, he gave advanced courses in psychology, and he followed up his 1926 book The Mystery of Mind with Fundamentals in Human Motivation in 1928. At the same time, he was chief engineer of the Technicolor Motion Picture Corporation of California and was appointed director of research at Technicolor in 1925.

Troland was elected to serve as president of the Optical Society of America from 1922 to 1923. He gave his name to the troland (symbol Td), the unit of conventional retinal illuminance. It is meant as a method for correcting photometric measurements of luminance values impinging on the human eye by scaling them by the effective pupil size.

The National Academy of Sciences gives an award on his behalf.

In 1932, he fell, accidentally, to his death into a rocky canyon while hiking near the observatory at Pasadena CA, Mount Wilson.

== Psychical research ==
Troland took an interest in psychical research and had carried out experiments in telepathy at Harvard University which were reported in 1917. He was one of the first scientists to use a machine in this type of experiment instead of a human experimenter. The machine consisted of a lamp which when triggered would light either of two square blocks. The agent would attempt to perceive the light in one room while the receiver would use a switch to identify which lamp had been lit in the other room. Troland discovered that the subjects had produced below chance expectations.

== Publications ==
- A Technique for the Experimental Study of Telepathy and Other Alleged Clairvoyant Processes (1917)
- The Nature of Matter and Electricity: An Outline of Modern Views [with Daniel Frost Comstock] (1917)
- The Mystery of Mind (1926)
- The Fundamentals of Human Motivation (1928)

== See also ==
- Optical Society of America
- Troland Research Awards
