= Adriana Galván =

American psychologist

- Occupations: Professor of Psychology; Dean of Undergraduate Education at UCLA
- Awards: William T. Grant Foundation Young Scholars Award (2013); APA Division 7 Boyd McCandless Award (2014); Cognitive Neuroscience Society Young Investigator Award (2016); APA Early Career Distinguished Scientific Contribution Award (2016); National Academy of Sciences Troland Award (2019); Presidential Early Career Award for Scientists and Engineers (2019)

Academic background
- Education: Barnard College (BA); Weill Medical College (PhD)
- Thesis: Neural Substrates and Development of Reward-Related Behavior

Academic work
- Discipline: Behavioral neuroscience
- Institutions: University of California, Los Angeles

Adriana Galván is an American psychologist and expert on adolescent brain development. She is a professor of psychology at the University of California, Los Angeles (UCLA) where she directs the Developmental Neuroscience laboratory. She was appointed the Jeffrey Wenzel Term Chair in Behavioral Neuroscience and the Dean of Undergraduate Education at UCLA.

== Biography ==
Dr. Galván got a B.A in neuroscience from Barnard college, Colombia University in 2001, and a Ph.D from Cornell Medical School in 2006. she did her postdoctral research at UCLA. Galván continued her education in neuroscience under the guidance of B.J. Casey at the Weill Medical College of Cornell University, where she completed her PhD in 2006. She obtained post-doctoral training under the supervision of Russell Poldrack and Susan Bookheimer at the Semel Institute for Neuroscience and Behavior at UCLA from 2006 to 2008, prior to joining the UCLA faculty in 2008. She was the honored recipient of the UCLA Department of Psychology Distinguished Teaching Award (Senior Ladder) in 2015.

Galván is a Fellow of the Association for Psychological Science and a recipient of a U.S. Fulbright Scholarship. Her research program has been supported by grants from the National Institutes of Health, National Science Foundation, Russell Sage Foundation, Jacobs Foundation, and the California Tobacco-Related Disease Research Program. Galván is also a standing member of the National Institutes of Health (NIH) Child Psychopathology and Developmental Disabilities Study Section.

Galván's research team studies the development of the brain from childhood into adolescence and adulthood, using various neuroimaging techniques to study psychological and neurobiological functioning. Her studies have explored neural mechanisms underlying decision-making and risk-taking, the influences of stress and other experiences on behavior and brain functioning, and neurobiological factors associated with cigarette smoking in adolescence. Her research on the topic of adolescent development was used in a TEDx talk. Other influential work has focused on how sleep affects the developing brain. Galván co-leads UCLA's Center for the Developing Adolescent, and has said she trains newly appointed juvenile court judges on adolescent brain development.

In 2021, Galván received UCLA's 202 Gold Shield Faculty Prize, That recognized her for her teaching, research and services.

In 2024, Galvan's research and expert testimony about brain development were considered in a massachusetts court case about life sentences for young adults.

In October 2026, Galván spoke at the American Academy of Peditatrics National Conference in San Diego, where she discussed how loneliness, social isolation, and community connections affect asolescent brain development.

=== Fun-Fact! ===
- Galván, who described herself as “painfully shy” as a young child, became much more outgoing during high school at San Marcos High School in Santa Barbara. There, she joined the marching band, took part in student government, and served as a cheerleader.

== Awards ==
- William T. Grant Foundation Young Scholars Award (2013)
- American Psychological Association (APA)Division 7 Boyd McCandless Award (2014)
- Cognitive Neuroscience Society Young Investigator Award (2016)
- APA Early Career Distinguished Scientific Contribution Award in Developmental Psychology (2016)
- National Academy of Sciences Troland Award (2019)
- Presidential Early Career Award for Scientists and Engineers (PECASE) (2019)
- Gold Shield Alumnae of UCLA Gold Shield Faculty Prize (2021)

== Books ==
- Galván, A. (2017). The Neuroscience of Adolescence. Cambridge University Press.

== Representative publications ==
- Casey, B. J., Getz, S., & Galván, A. (2008). The adolescent brain. Developmental Review, 28(1), 62–77.
- Galván, A. (2010). Adolescent development of the reward system. Frontiers in Human Neuroscience, 4, 6.
- Galván, A. (2013). The teenage brain: Sensitivity to rewards. Current Directions in Psychological Science, 22(2), 88–93.
- Galvan, A., Hare, T. A., Davidson, M., Spicer, J., Glover, G., & Casey, B. J. (2005). The role of ventral frontostriatal circuitry in reward-based learning in humans. Journal of Neuroscience, 25(38), 8650–8656.
- Galván, A., Hare, T. A., Parra, C. E., Penn, J., Voss, H., Glover, G., & Casey, B. J. (2006). Earlier development of the accumbens relative to orbitofrontal cortex might underlie risk-taking behavior in adolescents. Journal of Neuroscience, 26(25), 6885–6892.
- Galván, A., Hare, T., Voss, H., Glover, G., & Casey, B. J. (2007). Risk-taking and the adolescent brain: Who is at risk? Developmental Science, 10(2), F8-F14.
