= Exemplar theory =

Psychological categorization proposal

Exemplar theory is a proposal concerning the way humans categorize objects and ideas in psychology. It argues that individuals make category judgments by comparing new stimuli with instances already stored in memory. The instance stored in memory is the "exemplar". The new stimulus is assigned to a category based on the greatest number of similarities it holds with exemplars in that category. For example, the model proposes that people create the "bird" category by maintaining in their memory a collection of all the birds they have experienced: sparrows, robins, ostriches, penguins, etc. If a new stimulus is similar enough to some of these stored bird examples, the person categorizes the stimulus in the "bird" category. Various versions of the exemplar theory have led to a simplification of thought concerning concept learning, because they suggest that people use already-encountered memories to determine categorization, rather than creating an additional abstract summary of representations.

== Exemplar and prototype theory ==
Exemplar Theory is often contrasted with prototype theory, which proposes another method of categorization. Recently the adoption of both prototypes and exemplars based representations and categorization has been implemented in a cognitively inspired artificial system called DUAL PECCS (Dual Prototypes and Exemplars based Conceptual Categorization System) that, due to this integration, has extended the categorization capabilities of classical categorization models. The two theories are similar in that they emphasize the importance of similarity in categorization: only by resembling a prototype or exemplar can a new stimulus be placed into a category. They also both rely on the same general cognitive process: we experience a new stimulus, a concept in memory is triggered, we make a judgment of resemblance, and draw a categorization conclusion. However, the specifics of the two theories are different. Prototype theory suggests that a new stimulus is compared to a single prototype in a category, while exemplar theory suggests that a new stimulus is compared to multiple known exemplars in a category. While a prototype is an abstract average of the members of a category, an exemplar is an actual member of a category, pulled from memory. While prototypes are economical—meaning they are more conducive to quick judgments—exemplars are less so. On the other hand, prototypes are less flexible than exemplars: exemplars can account more easily for atypical category members, such as a penguin being part of the "bird" category, because an exemplar does not average out the characteristics of a category like a prototype does. Exemplars can make sense of variable categories—those with less distinguished characteristics—such as "games", much more so than prototypes, which rely on typical characteristics to determine membership. Another difference, suggested by research, is that exemplars are more likely to be used than prototypes after long experience with a concept.

The categorization process for identifying which type of animal a dog is can be used to provide an example for the usage of exemplar theory. All of the traits of the dog would be taken into consideration and compared, separately, to other animals the individual has encountered before. The individual would eventually conclude that the animal is a dog as it has all of the traits previously associated with an example of a dog. The individual could come to this conclusion using the prototype theory if the dog were average looking, but what happens if the dog only has three legs and does not bark? Here prototype theory might not allow the individual to conclude that the animal is a dog because it doesn't have prototypic traits but exemplar theory would take into account previous examples of dogs that do not bark or dogs that have injuries and are therefore missing limbs. Exemplar-based categorization approaches carefully go through all encountered examples in a given category to allow for accurate categorization.

Contradictory statements have been made about the accuracy of the exemplar theory for categorization when it is compared to prototype theory. For example, one study at Arizona State University concluded that the exemplar theory is most accurate with minimal category experience and as experience is developed the prototype theory is more accurate. Another study though, shows evidence that the exemplar-based approach is more accurate as you become more familiar with a category because knowledge of the members is greater than that that can be represented by a single prototype. It is clear that there are some situations where the exemplar-based approach is most accurate and others where it may not be the most accurate. This being said, it is evident that the brain naturally uses a combination of categorization approaches in everyday life.

A study done at the University of Oregon found that prototypical averages are more likely to be forgotten than many specific examples. Relying only on prototypes does not allow for adequate consideration while relying only on examples can be inefficient. Exemplar theory is more flexible than prototype theory but less economical, a combination of the two balances the flexibility with the efficiency. Experience with various examples averages into an ever-changing, more accurate prototype – it is not that exemplar theory and prototype theory compete against each other but that they work together, in tandem.

== Typicality and exemplars ==
Typicality is an idea often associated with exemplar theory, where the best fitting exemplars, or those sharing the most characteristics with other exemplars of the category, are considered typical and lead to quicker categorization of new stimuli that are similar to these typical exemplars. Typical exemplars are more likely to generate an accurate match when categorizing a new item. For example, when one is asked to generate a list of fruits, apples, oranges and bananas will often come to mind first as they are considered more typical. Fruits such as starfruit or figs might appear on the list but would require a more extensive search through memory.

== Exemplar frequency and recency ==
It has been suggested by researchers that increased frequency of the presentation of a stimulus will positively influence the typicality of an exemplar. As exemplar theory relies on memory of specific instances or experiences, there will be more instances of that exemplar to call upon from memory when a new potential category member is encountered. Continuing with the example of fruit, apples and oranges are encountered at a higher frequency, contributing to their typicality. Stimuli encountered soon after an exemplar is encountered can increase the rate of category recognition, this is known as recency. Priming of the exemplar makes the memory more easily accessible and come to mind quicker—therefore seeming more typical.

== Research ==
One study comparing rule-based theories and exemplar-based theories found that individuals use rules when the new items are confusable and use exemplars when they are distinct. Initially, categorization is based on rules. During the learning process, appropriate features for discriminating items is learned over time. Then, new items can be stored as exemplars and used to categorize less important items without discrepancies between rules.

For example, a radiologist must classify a suspicious spot on an X-ray either as a tumor or as natural tissue variation. Exemplar-based theories suggest that the decision is reached by comparing the current X-ray to exemplars of X-rays in memory. If the X-ray appears more visually similar to X-rays of tumors than to those of normal tissue, the radiologist may classify the suspicious spot as a tumor. Rule-based theories suggest that the radiologist observe whether the specific properties of the X-ray meet the same criteria as tumors (i.e. the definition of tumor). The decision of whether or not the suspicious spot is a tumor is based on the criteria alone.

The frequency with which the item has been encountered is an important factor in influencing its typicality. Research suggests that the typicality of airplane as a vehicle was assessed before September 11, 2001 and then various times after that date. The publicity from the incidents of 9/11 caused an increase in the rated typicality of airplane from five hours to one month after the terrorist attack. Approximately four and a half months after 9/11, the typicality of airplane returned to its normal level. These findings suggest that because of the amount of media coverage surrounding the events of 9/11, the word airplane was so frequently used that it became as common as a typical vehicle. Exemplar models provide explanations for concepts’ typicality ratings, the effects of typicality on categorization time, and effects due to the variability of instances within a category.

The work of Kahneman and Tversky illustrated that people use exemplars when making categorizations and decisions. In one of their experiments, it was found that participants estimated the frequency of occurrence of different types of events by finding several exemplars to base their approximation on. For example, when participants were asked if there are more words in the English language that either start with "k" or have "k" as the third letter, most chose the first option (even though this is incorrect). Participants presumably did so because they could generate more exemplars of words starting with "k" than they could of words with "k" as the third letter in the word. (This particular experiment also ties to the availability heuristic, by which we guess probability by the ease with which an example comes to mind.)

In categorization studies, participants sometimes conclude that a new stimuli is not a member of a certain category by finding a counter exemplar. For example, participants based their disagreement with the statement, "all birds are eagles" on their retrieval of memories of birds that weren't eagles, such as robins. If participants used exemplars to make disagreeing decisions, they also use exemplars to make reaffirming decisions about category membership.

A study by Barsalou et al. asserts that the categorization of event exemplars differs from the categorization of individual exemplars. Feature frequency controls how events are categorized, adding to a more summarized exemplar grouping while individuals are more often categorized separately, creating a new group when a new individual is encountered.

There is evidence supporting that the exemplar-based approach can be more accurate than the prototype approach. Exemplar models are more successful when learning complex concepts rather than simple concepts.

== See also ==
- Robert Nosofsky
