= Nancy Kanwisher =

American neuroscientist

Nancy G. Kanwisher
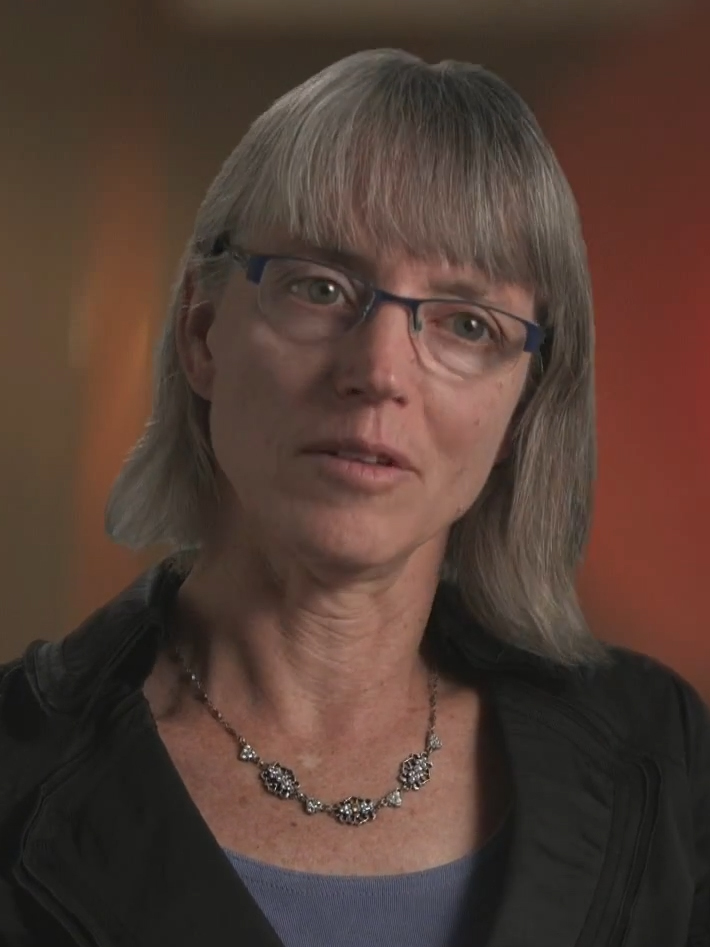
- Born: 1958 (age 67–68); Woods Hole, Massachusetts
- Education: Massachusetts Institute of Technology
- Known for: Fusiform face area
- Awards: Golden Brain Award; Heineken Prize; Kavli Prize
- Scientific career
- Fields: Cognitive psychology
- Workplaces: UCLA; Harvard University; Massachusetts Institute of Technology
- Thesis: Repetition blindness: type recognition without token individuation (1986)
- Doctoral advisor: Mary C. Potter
- Doctoral students: Frank Tong

Nancy Gail Kanwisher FBA (born 1958) is the Walter A Rosenblith Professor of Cognitive Neuroscience in the Department of Brain and Cognitive Sciences at the Massachusetts Institute of Technology and a researcher at the McGovern Institute for Brain Research. She studies the neural and cognitive mechanisms underlying human visual perception and cognition.

== Academic background ==
Nancy Kanwisher received her BS in biology from MIT in 1980 and her PhD in Brain and Cognitive Sciences from MIT in 1986. After obtaining her PhD working with Mary C. Potter, she then did her post-doctoral work with Anne Treisman at UC-Berkeley. Before returning to MIT as a faculty member in 1997 in the Department of Brain and Cognitive Sciences, Kanwisher served as a faculty member at both UCLA and Harvard University.

Kanwisher is a member and associate editor for journals in areas of cognitive science, including Cognition, Current Opinion in Neurobiology, Journal of Neuroscience, Trends in Cognitive Sciences, and Cognitive Neuropsychology. She has also written on other subjects, including an article in the Huffington Post and Proceedings of the National Academy of Sciences in 2010 about the Israeli-Palestinian conflict.

Kanwisher once shaved her head while teaching a lecture on neuroanatomy to point out the functional regions of the brain so her students could visualize the concepts.

== Achievements and awards ==
Kanwisher has received several accolades for her academic endeavors.

She was awarded the National Academy of Sciences Troland Research Award in 1999, awarded for achievement in investigations regarding relationships of consciousness and the physical world.

She received the MacVicar Faculty Fellow Award in 2002 and the 2016 National Institutes of Health Director's Pioneer Award.

In January 2021, she was awarded an honorary doctorate from University of York, England.

In 2002, she won the NAS Award in the Neurosciences.

In 2023, she won the Jean Nicod Prize.

In 2024, Kanwisher was one of three recipients of the Kavli Prize in neuroscience "for the discovery of a highly localized and specialized system for representation of faces in human and non-human primate neocortex".

Also in 2024, she was awarded the Rosenstiel Award of the Brandeis University.

Kanwisher founded the McGovern Institute for Brain Research at MIT and is the Walter A. Rosenblith Professor in the Department of Brain and Cognitive Sciences.

She serves as a member of the National Academy of Sciences (since 2005), American Academy of Arts and Sciences (since 2009), and received a MacArthur Foundation Fellowship in Peace and International Security (1986).

In July 2017, Kanwisher was elected a Corresponding Fellow of the British Academy (FBA), the United Kingdom's national academy for the humanities and social sciences.

== Research ==
Kanwisher has training in cognitive psychology, which is investigating how the mind works by observing its outward behavior. She is credited with co-discovering and characterizing the fusiform face area (FFA) in the human brain, a region whose function appears to be the recognition of fine distinctions between well-known objects and, in particular, faces. She also co-discovered the parahippocampal place area (PPA), a region of the brain that recognizes environmental scenes. These two discoveries are now widely discussed in the cognitive field and provide a gold standard for clarity in search for primitives of human cognition. In her research, she uses functional MRI, behavioral methods, and transcranial magnetic stimulation. She also uses ECOG to study audition, language processing, and social perception. She gave a 2014 TED Talk entitled "A Neural Portrait of the Human Mind".
