= Irene Jakab =

Hungarian-born psychiatrist (1919–2011)

Irene Jakab MD, PhD
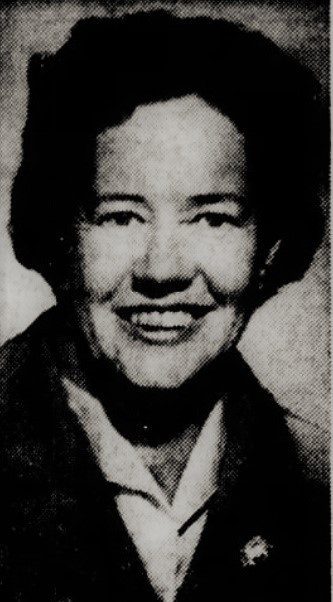
- Irene Jakab, MD, PhD, 1963
- Born: July 15, 1919; Hungary
- Died: June 18, 2011 (aged 91); Brookline, Massachusetts, U.S.
- Occupation(s): Psychiatrist and humanist
- Medical career
- Institutions: Professor of psychiatry emerita, University of Pittsburgh; Lecturer on Psychiatry, Harvard University School of Medicine; Attending psychiatrist, McLean Hospital

Irene Jakab (Hungarian: Jakab Irén; July 15, 1919 – June 18, 2011) was a psychiatrist and humanist who was a member of the Harvard University School of Medicine faculty prior to designing and directing "the John Merck program for mentally retarded emotionally disturbed children at Western Psychiatric Institute and Clinic (WPIC)" at the University of Pittsburgh in Pittsburgh, Pennsylvania from 1974 to 1982.

A native of Hungary and acting head of the psychiatry department at the University of Pécs, she defected while in Paris, France to present a lecture at the Sorbonne University. Subsequently hired as an academic by the Neurological Hospital at the University of Zurich in Switzerland, she worked there for two years prior to emigrating to the United States, where she performed three years of psychiatric residency at the Kansas Neurological Institute for Retarded Children in Topeka, Kansas (now known as the Menninger Foundation), beginning in 1963, to earn her certification from the American Board of Psychiatry and Neurology. She was then hired by Harvard in 1966.

Still classified, at the time of her death in 2011, as a Harvard lecturer in psychiatry and an honorary staff psychiatrist at the McLean Hospital in Belmont, Massachusetts, Jakab was also known for her advocacy of the use of art therapy to improve the quality of life of individuals with learning disabilities or mental illness.

== Formative years ==
Born on July 15, 1919, Jakab was a native of Hungary and a daughter of Ödön (Edmund) Jakab. In 1932, she entered Notre Dame de Sion High School in Arad, Romania, graduating in 1937. Awarded a medical degree in 1944 by Franz Joseph University in Kolozsvár (Cluj), she graduated cum laude with a degree in psychology, education and philosophy from Bolyai University in Cluj, Romania in 1947, and was then awarded a doctor of philosophy degree in psychology, education and general literature, summa cum laude, at Pázmány Péter University in Budapest in 1948.

== Academic and healthcare career ==
Employed as an academic and psychiatrist by the psychiatry department at the University of Pécs during the early years of her career, she was subsequently appointed acting head of that university's psychiatry department. While representing the university in Paris, France as a lecturer at the Sorbonne University, she defected. She then performed academic work at the Neurological Hospital at the University of Zurich in Switzerland for two years prior to emigrating to the United States, where she initially settled in Topeka, Kansas in 1963, and performed three years of psychiatric residency at the Kansas Neurological Institute for Retarded Children (now the Menninger Foundation) in order to earn her certification from the American Board of Psychiatry and Neurology.

In 1966, she was appointed to the faculty of Harvard University’s School of Medicine. As an assistant professor of psychiatry at Harvard and an associate psychiatrist at the McLean Hospital in Belmont, Massachusetts during the mid-1970s, Jakab was a frequent featured speaker at conferences and symposia across the United States. In June 1968, she directed a three-day, art therapy professional development workshop for staff at the University of Hawaiʻi’s Counseling and Testing Center. In April 1974, she presented a lecture about the "use of art as therapy for emotionally disturbed children."

It was also during this time that she helped her parents to emigrate from Hungary; in 1972, they made their new home in Brookline, Massachusetts, the city where Jakab was living at the time.

Shortly thereafter, Jakab, who had developed a growing list of contacts within academia and the healthcare industry, was persuaded to leave Massachusetts and relocate to Pittsburgh, Pennsylvania during the early 1970s, by Thomas Detre, a fellow native of Hungary who was director and chair of the department of psychiatry at the Western Psychiatric Institute and Clinic (WPIC) at the University of Pittsburgh. It was here that Jakab designed, and then directed "the John Merck program for mentally retarded emotionally disturbed children" from 1974 to 1982, using pilot program funding from Serena Merck, the widow of the former chief executive officer of Merck Pharmaceuticals, George W. Merck, whose son had been diagnosed with cerebral palsy, depression and learning disabilities. Initially created as an inpatient program for ten children, it grew to become a healthcare initiative with the capacity to deliver inpatient care to thirty-three patients at a time; it was then expanded further to provide care for individuals with "neurodevelopmental disabilities and co-occurring psychiatric diagnoses, across the lifespan." The staff who worked at the clinic under Jakab were called "Merckies."

In 1977, she analyzed artwork created by Jack Ruby, the man who murdered Lee Harvey Oswald, the 1963 assassin of United States President John F. Kennedy. Ruby's drawing, which was included as part of art exhibits at the World Congress of Psychiatry meeting in Waikiki, Hawaii and the University of Hawaii in late August and early September 1977, was completed while Ruby was in jail, and conveyed Ruby's "repressed aggression and secretiveness," according to Jakab, who added:

"Notice how he really constricts himself so as not to reveal himself. He hides behind all those geometrical lines and pointed edges. You can feel his controlled aggression."

Appointed as the director of the University of Pittsburgh's medical student education programs in child psychiatry in 1982, she continued to serve in that capacity until 1989, when she was named professor emerita.

=== Publications ===
Jakab authored multiple academic journal articles and fourteen books related to the fields of child psychiatry, neurology, neuropsychology, and psychiatry, including the following:

- Jakab I. "The history of the founding of Societe de Psychopathologie de L'Expression (SIPE) and the early development," in Psychiatry Hungary. 2010;25(4):276-90. PMID 20938055
- Jakab, Irene. "'Scribbling' in Art Therapy," Journal of Music Therapy, Vol. 2, Issue 1, March 1965, pp. 3–7 doi:10.1093/jmt/2.1.3
- Jakab, Irene, ed. "Transcultural aspects of psychiatric art." Boston, Massachusetts: International Congress of Psychopathology of Expression, 1973 and Basel, Switzerland and New York: S. Karger, 1975. ISBN 978-3-8055-2138-3

== Professional affiliations ==
A member of multiple academic and healthcare societies related to arts therapy, psychiatry and psychology throughout her career, Jakab was a member, from 1977 to 1981, of the University of Pittsburgh's University Senate organization and procedures committee and of the expressive therapies planning group in the School of Health Related Professions.

Chair of the educational resources committee at the Western Psychiatric Institute and Clinic from 1981 to 1983 and of the children's services leadership group of the University of Pittsburgh committee that oversaw the program operations for children with developmental disorders, Jakab was also a past president of the American Society of Psychopathology of Expression.

== Awards and other recognition ==
In 1989, Jakab was named one of five “Real Pittsburghers” by Pittsburgh Magazine for her contributions to the city. The next year, she was recognized by the United States Department of Veterans Affairs with its physician's award for her efforts to improve clinical care for military veterans.

In addition, an annual award bearing Jakab's name was created at the McLean Hospital in Massachusetts in recognition of her work there as a psychiatrist. In 2006, she was awarded the title of honorary staff psychiatrist by the hospital in recognition of her forty years of service.

== Later years ==
Following her appointment as professor of psychiatry emerita by the University of Pittsburgh and her retirement from that university, Jakab returned to her home in Brookline, Massachusetts, but remained active as a clinician and educator. In 1989, she was the featured speaker at a seminar hosted by Bethesda Hospital in Ohio. Entitled, "Through the Looking Glass: Patient Art as a Diagnostic Tool," the professional development program was designed to teach hospital staff how to use patient art as methods of assessment and treatment to help improve medical care for rape survivors and patients with mental health or terminal illnesses.

At the age of ninety-one, she was still listed on faculty rosters as a psychiatry lecturer at Harvard University's School of Medicine.

== Death and interment ==
Jakab died in Brookline at the age of ninety-one on June 18, 2011. Her funeral was held at the Saint Joseph Cemetery in West Roxbury, Massachusetts, where she was then interred.

== Legacy ==
During the resolution of Jakab's estate, a bequest was made to the University of Pittsburgh "to support a lecture by a pioneer in research focusing on developmental disorders." Pasko Rakic, MD, PhD, the Dorys McConnell Duberg professor of neuroscience and professor of neurology at Yale University, was chosen to be the inaugural speaker for the new lecture series, which began on March 27, 2015. Chair of Yale's Department of Neurobiology at the time, he was also director of the Yale Kavli Institute for Neuroscience, and was investigating "developmental neurobiology, particularly cellular and molecular mechanisms of neuronal proliferation, migration and synaptogenesis during development and evolution of the cerebral and cerebellar cortex." Nim Tottenham, PhD, an associate professor of psychology at Columbia University and developmental affective neuroscientist who was investigating mature human emotion regulation, was chosen to be the speaker for the Irene Jakab Memorial Lecture, which took place on April 28, 2017.
