= Lori L. Holt =

American psychologist

- Awards: Troland Research Awards (2013), James McKeen Cattell Fund Fellowship (2015–2016), Fellow of the Acoustical Society of America (2022)

Academic background
- Education: University of Wisconsin–Madison (B.S., Ph.D.)

Academic work
- Discipline: Psychology, speech perception, auditory cognition
- Institutions: Carnegie Mellon University, University of Texas at Austin

Lori L. Holt is Chair and Professor of Psychology at The University of Texas at Austin. She specializes in speech perception, focusing on how general perceptual and cognitive mechanisms contribute to speech perception and how speech can be used to broadly understand auditory cognition. In pursuit of these research areas, she has employed human perceptual and learning paradigms as well as animal behavioral experiments and computational models. Holt received a B.S. in psychology from the University of Wisconsin–Madison in 1995 and a Ph.D. in cognitive psychology with a minor in neurophysiology from UW–Madison in 1999. She was faculty in the Department of Psychology and the Center for the Neural Basis of Cognition at Carnegie Mellon University before taking a position as professor of psychology at The University of Texas at Austin. Holt served as co-director of the Center for the Neural basis of Cognition and was one of two recipients of the Troland Research Awards in 2013. She was also one of three recipients awarded the James McKeen Cattell Fund Fellowship for 2015-2016. In 2022, she was elected a fellow of the Acoustical Society of America (ASA) for her research into the neural processing and perception of complex auditory phenomena.
