= Catherine Hartley =

American psychologist

- Education: Stanford University; New York University; Weill Cornell Medical College
- Known for: Developmental changes in decision-making and motivated behavior in humans
- Awards: 2020 Cognitive Neuroscience Society Young Investigator Award, 2019 Early Career Award Society for Neuroeconomics, 2018 Association for Psychological Science Janet Taylor Spence Award
- Scientific career
- Fields: Psychology, neuroscience
- Workplaces: New York University

Catherine Hartley is an American psychologist and a Professor of Psychology within the Department of Psychology and Center for Neural Science at New York University in New York City. Hartley's research explores how brain development impacts the evaluation of negative experiences, decision-making, and motivated behavior. Her work has helped to elucidate how uncontrollable aversive events affect fear learning and how learning to control aversive stimuli can improve emotional resilience.

== Early life and education ==
Hartley has been interested in how experiences guide decision making and behaviors for as long as she can remember. In her high school AP Psychology class, she read a book by Oliver Sacks and this was one pivotal moment in her decision to pursue a career in academic psychology. She pursued her undergraduate degree at Stanford University, majoring in Symbolic Systems. During her undergrad, she joined the lab of John Gabrieli and worked under the mentorship of a graduate student in the lab, Noam Sobel. She conducted her undergraduate research in Cognitive Neuroscience and became a co-author on three publications exploring human olfaction. Her work helped elucidate that the anterior cerebellum plays a role in regulating sniff volume in relation to odour concentration and that the human brain is activated by odourants at undetectably low concentrations.

After graduating from Stanford in 1999 with a Bachelors of Science, Hartley decided to pursue work in industry as a software engineer at a small artificial intelligence startup in New York City. She worked with the startup for two years, building intelligent machines into software systems. Hartley later used this training in AI where she learned to think about the basic ingredients of intelligence, in her own independent research program. She then joined her former colleagues to work on algorithmic financial market predictions.

By 2006, Hartley was ready to return to academia, and pursued her graduate work at the New York University in the Department of Psychology. She worked under the mentorship of Elizabeth A. Phelps studying Individual differences in the expression and control of conditioned fear. Hartley had her first child during her PhD.

Hartley's PhD work to elucidate the neural circuits underlying emotional regulation and expression of fear began with an exploration of how individual variations in brain structure correlate to fear responses in humans. She found that the thickness of the ventromedial prefrontal cortex was correlated with fear-related arousal and that increased thickness of the posterior insula was correlated with larger conditioned responses during fear acquisition. She then explored how serotonin signalling impacts fear memories. Her article in the Proceedings of the National Academy of Sciences showed that specific risk alleles in the human serotonin transporter are associated with spontaneous fear recovery after extinction and heightened depression and anxiety. This work highlighted the role that individual differences in serotonin signalling might play in the propensity for depression and anxiety.

Hartley completed her PhD in 2011, and then pursued her postdoctoral work at the Sackler Institute for Developmental Psychobiology at Weill Cornell Medical College. She worked under the mentorship of B.J. Casey. During this time, she continued to publish many papers from her graduate work and also had her second child. The work she published from her graduate studies explored how control of an aversive experience is related to the behavioral consequences and fear responses. She found that when stressors were controllable, fear extinction was improved and spontaneous recovery of fear associations was limited. Her new postdoctoral further work began to explore the relation of stress to fear learning throughout development. Along with several collaborators, Hartley explored when anxiety-related treatments might be most effective throughout development. They found that lack of synaptic plasticity in the prefrontal cortex in adolescent mice was associated with blunted fear extinction.

== Career and research ==
Hartley was then recruited to join the faculty at Weill Cornell Medical College in 2014. As an assistant professor in the Sackler Institute for Developmental Psychobiology and as a principal investigator of the Hartley Lab, she focused on exploring how learning and decision making change throughout development and how adverse experiences and uncontrollable events in adolescence contribute to aberrations in cognitive and emotional processing and how the ability to control stressors might enhance emotional resilience and improve goal-directed cognition.

In 2016, Hartley returned to NYU and became an assistant professor in the Department of Psychology and the Center for Neural Science. She also became an investigator in the Max Planck - NYU Center for Language, Music, and Emotion (CLaME). In 2020, Hartley received tenure at NYU. In 2020, Hartley was also elected to become a Board Member of the Flux Society to advance research in the understanding of human brain development.

=== Developmental changes in decision making and motivated behavior ===
Hartley was interested in exploring how decision-making strategies are employed and change throughout development. She found that model-free strategies were employed across all age groups while model-based strategies began to be recruited in adolescents and strengthened in adults suggesting that the development and recruitment of model-based valuation system, and development of goal directed behavior. h

Following this study, Hartley probed the cognitive mechanisms by which the memories of reinforced and unreinforced aversive events are enhanced across adults and adolescents. She found that, in both adults and adolescents, autonomic arousal and reinforced exemplars enhanced recognition. Her work in humans supported the findings from rodents that acquisition of Pavlovian conditioned aversive responses is compared across adolescents and adults.

=== Behavioral control and threat responses ===
A large component of Hartley's research pertains to exploring how exerting behavioral control over threatening stimuli changes the response to threats in the environment. It is known in rodents that fear responses diminish when rodents are able to exert control over threatening stimuli, so Heartley and her team sought to determine if this was also true in humans. Using fMRI they found that active avoidance is more important than extinction in leading to long term changes in fear responses in humans.

== Awards and honors ==
- 2023 Troland Research Award
- 2020 Cognitive Neuroscience Society Young Investigator Award
- 2019 Early Career Award Society for Neuroeconomics
- 2018 Association for Psychological Science Janet Taylor Spence Award
- 2018 Jacobs Foundation Early Career Fellowship
- 2016 Faculty Early Career Development Award from the National Science Foundation
- 2017 Klingenstein-Simons Fellowship in Neuroscience
- 2016 Elected one of the Rising Stars by the Association for Psychological Science

== Select publications ==
- Heller AS, Shi TC, Ezie CEC, Reneau TR, Baez LM, Gibbons CJ, Hartley CA. 2020. Association between real-world experiential diversity and positive affect relates to hippocampal-striatal functional connectivity. Nature Neuroscience. PMID 32424287 DOI: 10.1038/s41593-020-0636-4
- Rosenbaum GM, Hartley CA. 2019. Developmental perspectives on risky and impulsive choice. Philosophical Transactions of the Royal Society of London. Series B, Biological Sciences. 374: 20180133. PMID 30966918 DOI: 10.1098/rstb.2018.0133
- Gee DG, Bath KG, Johnson CM, Meyer HC, Murty VP, van den Bos W, Hartley CA. 2018. Neurocognitive Development of Motivated Behavior: Dynamic Changes across Childhood and Adolescence. The Journal of Neuroscience: the Official Journal of the Society For Neuroscience. 38: 9433–9445. PMID 30381435 DOI: 10.1523/JNEUROSCI.1674-18.2018
- Boeke EA, Moscarello J, LeDoux JE, Phelps EA, Hartley CA. 2017. Active avoidance: Neural mechanisms and attenuation of Pavlovian conditioned responding. The Journal of Neuroscience: the Official Journal of the Society For Neuroscience. PMID 28408411 DOI: 10.1523/JNEUROSCI.3261-16.2017
- Gershman SJ, Hartley CA. 2015. Individual differences in learning predict the return of fear. Learning & Behavior. 43: 243–50. PMID 26100524 DOI: 10.3758/s13420-015-0176-z
- Hartley CA, Lee FS. 2015. Sensitive periods in affective development: nonlinear maturation of fear learning. Neuropsychopharmacology : Official Publication of the American College of Neuropsychopharmacology. 40: 50–60. PMID 25035083 DOI: 10.1038/npp.2014.179
- Hartley CA, Gorun A, Reddan MC, Ramirez F, Phelps EA. 2014. Stressor controllability modulates fear extinction in humans. Neurobiology of Learning and Memory. 113: 149–56. PMID 24333646 DOI: 10.1016/j.nlm.2013.12.003
- Hartley CA, McKenna MC, Salman R, Holmes A, Casey BJ, Phelps EA, Glatt CE. 2012. Serotonin transporter polyadenylation polymorphism modulates the retention of fear extinction memory. Proceedings of the National Academy of Sciences of the United States of America. 109: 5493–8. PMID 22431634 DOI: 10.1073/pnas.1202044109
- Hartley CA, Phelps EA. 2012. Anxiety and decision-making. Biological Psychiatry. 72: 113–8. PMID 22325982 DOI: 10.1016/j.biopsych.2011.12.027
- Hartley CA, Fischl B, Phelps EA. 2011. Brain structure correlates of individual differences in the acquisition and inhibition of conditioned fear. Cerebral Cortex (New York, N.Y. : 1991). 21: 1954–62. PMID 21263037 DOI: 10.1093/cercor/bhq253
- Hartley CA, Phelps EA. 2010. Changing fear: the neurocircuitry of emotion regulation. Neuropsychopharmacology : Official Publication of the American College of Neuropsychopharmacology. 35: 136–46. PMID 19710632 DOI: 10.1038/npp.2009.121
- Sobel N, Prabhakaran V, Hartley CA, Desmond JE, Zhao Z, Glover GH, Gabrieli JD, Sullivan EV. 1998. Odorant-induced and sniff-induced activation in the cerebellum of the human. The Journal of Neuroscience: the Official Journal of the Society For Neuroscience. 18: 8990–9001. PMID 9787004
