= Yael Niv =

Neuroscientist

- יעל ניב
- Occupations: Professor of Psychology and Neuroscience
- Awards: 2012 Presidential Early Career Award for Scientists and Engineers; 2015 National Academy of Sciences Troland Research Award

Academic background
- Education: Tel-Aviv University; Hebrew University of Jerusalem

Academic work
- Institutions: Princeton University

Yael Niv (Hebrew: יעל ניב) is a neuroscientist who studies human and animal reinforcement learning and decision making. She is Professor of Psychology and Neuroscience at Princeton University. Niv is known for her research contributions and for her visible advocacy work fighting against gender bias in neuroscience. Niv is founder of biaswatchneuro.com, a website that tracks statistics in an effort to combat sexism in science.

Niv was the recipient of the 2015 National Academy of Sciences Troland Research Award, and the 2012 Presidential Early Career Award for Scientists and Engineers. She was a recipient of an Alfred P. Sloan Research Fellowship in 2010 and an Ellison Medical Foundation Scholar in 2011.

== Biography ==
Niv completed a Master of Arts degree at Tel-Aviv University in 2001. Her Master's thesis, was supervised by Daphna Joel and Eytan Ruppin and titled Evolution of Reinforcement Learning in Uncertain Environments. Niv received a Ph.D. in neuroscience at the Hebrew University of Jerusalem in 2008, where she worked under the supervision of Peter Dayan on studies of behavioral control. Her dissertation was titled The Effects of Motivation on Habitual Instrumental Behavior.

After a post-doctoral fellowship at Princeton, Niv joined the faculty of the Princeton Neuroscience Institute and Psychology Department in 2008.

Niv investigates the neural and computational processes underlying reinforcement learning—the ongoing day-to-day processes by which we learn from trial and error to maximize reward and minimize punishment. She studies signals in the brain that may reflect dual-control mechanisms underlying decision making, including an attention system in the prefrontal cortex and a reinforcement learning system in the basal ganglia. Niv is interested in normative explanations of behavior and in developing neurocognitive models that offer principled explanations of brain mechanisms and their underlying computational algorithms. She asks in what sense, if at all, neurocomputational algorithms yield optimal decisions. From her perspective, the main goal of computational neuroscience is not to simulate the system, but rather to understand what higher-level computations are instantiated in the brain, and the functionality of these neural computations.

== Representative publications ==
- Niv, Y. (2009). Reinforcement learning in the brain. Journal of Mathematical Psychology, 53(3), 139–154.
- Niv, Y. (2019). Learning task-state representations. Nature Neuroscience, 22(10), 1544–1553.
- Niv, Y. (2021). The primacy of behavioral research for understanding the brain. Behavioral Neuroscience, 135(5), 601–609.
- Niv, Y., Daniel, R., Geana, A., Gershman, S., Leong, Y. C., Radulescu, A., & Wilson, R. (2015). Reinforcement learning in multidimensional environments relies on attention mechanisms. Journal of Neuroscience, 35(21), 8145–8157.
- Niv, Y., Daw, N. D., Joel, D., & Dayan, P. (2007). Tonic dopamine: opportunity costs and the control of response vigor. Psychopharmacology, 191(3), 507–520.
- Niv, Y., Edlund, J. A., Dayan, P., & O'Doherty, J. P. (2012). Neural prediction errors reveal a risk-sensitive reinforcement-learning process in the human brain. Journal of Neuroscience, 32(2), 551–562.
