= BJ Casey =

American psychology professor

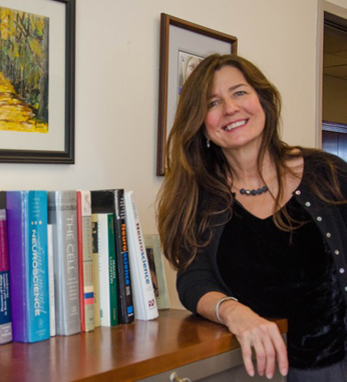
- Occupation: Professor of Neuroscience
- Awards: 2017 Social & Affective Neuroscience Society Distinguished Scholar Award; 2019 Flux: The Society for Developmental Cognitive Neuroscience Huttenlocher Award; 2021 Association for Psychological Science Lifetime Achievement Mentor Award; 2021 Elected to the American Academy of Arts and Sciences; 2022 American Psychological Association Distinguished Scientific Contribution Award; 2023 Mika Saltpeter Lifetime Achievement Award, Society for Neuroscience; 2025 Elected to the National Academy of Sciences

Academic background
- Education: Appalachian State University; University of South Carolina

Academic work
- Institutions: Barnard College of Columbia University

Betty Jo "BJ" Casey is an American cognitive neuroscientist and expert on adolescent brain development and self control. She is the Christina L. Williams Professor of Neuroscience at Barnard College of Columbia University where she directs the Fundamentals of the Adolescent Brain (FAB) Lab and is an Affiliated Professor of the Justice Collaboratory at Yale Law School, Yale University.

Casey has served on several national and international advisory boards and has won numerous honors and awards for her scientific discoveries that have been featured in several media outlets such as National Geographic, Time, and NPR.

== Biography ==
Casey was born in Kinston, North Carolina and grew up on a small family farm. She was the first in her family to obtain an advanced degree, earning her bachelor's and master's degrees in psychology from Appalachian State University and her doctorate in experimental psychology and behavioral neuroscience from the University of South Carolina. During her postdoctoral fellowship at the National Institute of Mental Health, Casey learned about functional magnetic resonance imaging (fMRI), which offered a glimpse into the functioning human brain non-invasively. She was among the first scientists to use fMRI in children, laying the groundwork for a new field of study: developmental cognitive neuroscience.

Following her postdoc, she was an assistant professor at the University of Pittsburgh Medical Center and a Visiting Research Collaborator at Princeton University. She was then recruited by Michael Posner to direct the Sackler Institute for Developmental Psychobiology. During this time, she held the position of associate professor and professor of psychology in Psychiatry and Neuroscience at Weill Cornell Medicine and Visiting Researcher at Rockefeller University. Casey also served as the Director of the Neuroscience Graduate Program at Weill Cornell for five years. In 2016, Casey moved to Yale University as a professor in the Department of Psychology, an affiliate professor of Interdepartmental Neuroscience Program of Yale School of Medicine and affiliate professor of the Justice Collaboratory at Yale Law School. Casey returned to New York in 2022 as the Christina L. Williams Professor of Neuroscience at Barnard College of Columbia University where she currently directs the Fundamentals of the Adolescent Brain (FAB) lab.

Casey has served on several national advisory boards, including the National Institute of Mental Health (NIMH) Board of Scientific Counselors and NIMH Council, the Scientific Advisory Board for the National Alliance for Research on Schizophrenia & Depression (NARSAD), Advisory Board for the Human Connectome Project - Life Span Study, the National Research Council Board on Children, Youth and Families, and National Research Council and Institute of Medicine committees of the National Academies on the Science of Adolescent Risk Taking, Assessing Juvenile Justice Reform, and Sports Related Concussions in Youth.

== Research ==
External videos
- CNS 2022: BJ Casey, PhD, "Cognitive Neuroscience in an Age of Discovery", 2022

Casey is one of the most cited scientists in developmental neuroscience, with over 250 publications and over 80,000 citations.

Over the course of her career, her work has spanned a range of topics across human development from visual attention in infants, to adolescent development, and the subsequent transition into early adulthood. In addition to using fMRI to examine typical and atypical brain and behavioral development, Casey has studied both humans and genetically altered mice in her research. Her work has demonstrated similar patterns of behavior and brain activity during adolescence across species. Casey proposed a prominent model of adolescent neurobiology known as the imbalance model, a foundational theory for many developmental neuroscience studies in humans and in animals. This model posits that dynamic changes in brain structure and function during adolescence lead to transient imbalances in how brain areas communicate that impact emotion reactivity and regulation during adolescence, relative to earlier and later developmental stages. In collaboration with the late Walter Mischel, Casey studied the original participants of Mischel's famous 1972 Stanford Bing Nursery School "Marshmallow Experiment" 40 years later. The study's findings suggested that individual differences in self-control seen in early childhood may be predictive of motivational processes and cognitive control in adulthood.

During Casey's 15-year tenure as the director of the Sackler Institute for Developmental Psychobiology, she cultivated the institute's world-renowned reputation, bringing in numerous training and center grants from the National Institutes of Health, National Science Foundation, the John Merck Fund, the Dana Foundation, and the MacArthur Foundation. Among these are two approximately $10 million grants from the National Institutes of Health. From 2008 to 2013, one of these awards funded the Center for Brain, Gene, and Behavioral (CBGB) Research Across Development, which aimed to examine how brain-derived neurotrophic factor (BDNF) influenced learning and responses to stress across development. In 2015, the National Institutes of Health funded the Adolescent Brain Cognitive Development (ABCD) Study®, the largest long-term study of child and adolescent health and brain development in the United States. Casey was awarded a grant of over $20 million as Principal Investigator of the ABCD Study Yale University site.

== Mentoring and training ==
Casey directed the John Merck Fund Summer Institute on the Biology of Developmental Disabilities from 2001 to 2010 and then the Mortimer D. Sackler, M.D. Summer Institute on Translational Developmental Neuroscience from 2012 to 2016, both specialized training courses in developmental science for graduate students, postdocs, and early career faculty.

Casey has formally mentored over 30 pre and post doctoral trainees. Her trainees include Adriana Galván, Catherine Hartley, Leah Somerville, and Nim Tottenham. She has received lifetime achievement awards for her scientific discoveries and mentoring, especially of women in science from the Association of Psychological Science in 2021 and from the Society of Neuroscience in 2023.

== Public engagement ==
Casey is a member of the MacArthur Foundation Research Network on Law and Neuroscience and has been called upon as an expert in adolescent brain development in both the scientific and legal arenas. Her research was included in amicus briefs presented to the U.S. Supreme Court to argue against the death penalty in juveniles (Roper v. Simmons, 2005) and mandatory life without parole (Graham v. Florida, 2010; Miller v. Alabama, 2012).

== Awards and honors ==
- 2014, Honorary doctorate, Utrecht University
- 2015, Ruane Prize for Outstanding Achievement in Child and Adolescent Psychiatric Research, Brain & Behavior Research Foundation
- 2016, Healthcare and Life Sciences 50, Irish America magazine
- 2017, Distinguished Scholar Award, Social Affective Neuroscience Society
- 2019, Flux Huttenlocher Award, The Society for Developmental Cognitive Neuroscience
- 2021, Association for Psychological Science Lifetime Achievement Mentor Award
- 2021, Elected to the American Academy of Arts and Sciences
- 2022, American Psychological Association Distinguished Scientific Contribution Award
- 2022, George A. Miller Prize in Cognitive Neuroscience, Cognitive Neuroscience Society
- 2023, Mika Salpeter Lifetime Achievement Award, Society for Neuroscience
- 2025, Elected to the National Academy of Sciences

== Selected publications ==
- Casey, BJ; Cohen, JD; Jezzard, P; Turner, R; Noll, D; Trainor, R; Giedd, J; Kaysen, D; Hertz-Pannier, L; Rapoport, JL (September 1995). "Activation of PFC in children during a non-spatial working memory task with functional MRI". NeuroImage. 2 (3): 221–9. doi:10.1006/nimg.1995.1029. PMID 9343606. S2CID 7257192.
- Casey, BJ; Castellanos, FX; Giedd, JN; Marsh, WL; Hamburger, SD; Schubert, AB; Vauss, YC; Vaituzis, AC; Dickstein, DP; Sarfatti, SE; Rapoport, JL (March 1997). "Implication of right frontostriatal circuitry in response inhibition and attention-deficit/hyperactivity disorder". Journal of the American Academy of Child and Adolescent Psychiatry. 36 (3): 374–83. doi:10.1097/00004583-199703000-00016. PMID 9055518.
- Casey, BJ; Trainor, RJ; Orendi, JL; Schubert, AB; Nystrom, LE; Giedd, JN; Castellanos, FX; Haxby, JV; Noll, DC; Cohen, JD; Forman, SD; Dahl, RE; Rapoport, JL (November 1997). "A Developmental Functional MRI Study of Prefrontal Activation during Performance of a Go-No-Go Task". Journal of Cognitive Neuroscience. 9 (6): 835–47. doi:10.1162/jocn.1997.9.6.835. PMID 23964603. S2CID 10082889.
- Casey, BJ; Giedd, JN; Thomas, KM (October 2000). "Structural and functional brain development and its relation to cognitive development". Biological Psychology. 54 (1–3): 241–57. doi:10.1016/s0301-0511(00)00058-2. PMID 11035225. S2CID 18314401.
- Casey, BJ; Tottenham, N; Liston, C; Durston, S (March 2005). "Imaging the developing brain: what have we learned about cognitive development?". Trends in Cognitive Sciences. 9 (3): 104–10. doi:10.1016/j.tics.2005.01.011. PMID 15737818. S2CID 6331990.
- Casey, BJ; Getz, S; Galvan, A (2008). "The adolescent brain". Developmental Review. 28 (1): 62–77. doi:10.1016/j.dr.2007.08.003. PMC 2500212. PMID 18688292.
- Casey, BJ; Somerville, LH; Gotlib, IH; Ayduk, O; Franklin, NT; Askren, MK; Jonides, J; Berman, MG; Wilson, NL; Teslovich, T; Glover, G; Zayas, V; Mischel, W; Shoda, Y (6 September 2011). "Behavioral and neural correlates of delay of gratification 40 years later". Proceedings of the National Academy of Sciences of the United States of America. 108 (36): 14998–5003. doi:10.1073/pnas.1108561108. PMC 3169162. PMID 21876169.
- Casey, B. J. (3 January 2015). "Beyond Simple Models of Self-Control to Circuit-Based Accounts of Adolescent Behavior". Annual Review of Psychology. 66 (1): 295–319. doi:10.1146/annurev-psych-010814-015156. ISSN 0066-4308. PMID 25089362.
- Casey, B.J.; Simmons, C.; Somerville, L.H.; Baskin-Sommers, A. (13 January 2022). "Making the Sentencing Case: Psychological and Neuroscientific Evidence for Expanding the Age of Youthful Offenders". Annual Review of Criminology. 5 (1): 321–343. doi:10.1146/annurev-criminol-030920-113250. ISSN 2572-4568. S2CID 238693956.
- Casey, B.J.; Conhen, A.O.; Galvan, A (2025). "The beautiful adolescent brain". Annals of the New York Academy of Sciences. doi:10.1111/nyas.15314. PMC 11998480.
- Casey, B.J.; Lin, Y.; Meyer, H. (2025). "Examining threat responses through the lens of development". Cerebral Cortex. doi:10.1093/cercor/bhae449.
