= Marlene Cohen =

American neuroscientist

Marlene R. Cohen
- Education: Stanford University; Harvard University; Massachusetts Institute of Technology
- Known for: Study of relationships between the activity of groups of neurons, cognitive state, and behavior.
- Awards: McKnight Scholar Award (2015)
- Scientific career
- Fields: Neuroscience
- Workplaces: University of Chicago

Marlene R. Cohen is an American neuroscientist and Professor of Neurobiology at the University of Chicago. She studies how populations of neurons encode visual information and cognitive states such as attention, and how those neural representations guide behavior. She is recognized for pioneering use of multielectrode array recording to determine that the improved behavioral performance associated with redirecting spatial attention has a neural correlate in the brain that is reflected by reduced correlated activity between neurons. Cohen has also demonstrated that this same mechanism happens during learning. She has received several awards for her work, including the Troland Research Award from the National Academy of Sciences in 2018

== Early life and education ==
- Cohen received bachelor’s degrees in Mathematics and Brain & Cognitive Sciences from the Massachusetts Institute of Technology.
- She earned her Ph.D. from Stanford University, where she investigated how interactions between neurons depend on behavioral and attentional states, working in collaboration with William Newsome’s lab.
- She conducted postdoctoral research in John Maunsell’s lab at Harvard Medical School, using attention as a tool to probe which aspects of population codes are behaviorally relevant.

== Academic Positions ==
- Cohen joined the University of Pittsburgh faculty in 2011, where she continued her work on population coding in visual cortex.
- In 2022, she moved to the University of Chicago, where she holds appointments as Professor of Neurobiology and is affiliated with the Neuroscience Institute.
- She serves on the Committee on Computational Neuroscience and the Committee on Neurobiology at the University of Chicago.

== Selected Awards ==
- Klingenstein Fellowship Award in the Neurosciences (2012).
- Eppendorf & Science Prize for Neurobiology, grand prize winner (2012).
- McKnight Scholar Award (2015).
- Troland Research Award from the National Academy of Sciences (2018).
- In 2025, she was named the inaugural recipient of the Robert H. Wurtz Award and Lecture in Systems Neuroscience.
