= Elizabeth A. Buffalo =

American physiologist and academic

- Education: Wellesley College; University of California, San Diego
- Occupations: Professor, University of Washington School of Medicine
- Awards: Troland Research Award (2011)

Elizabeth A. Buffalo is the Wayne E. Crill Endowed Professor and Chair of Physiology and Biophysics at the University of Washington School of Medicine and chief of the neuroscience division at the Washington National Primate Research Center. She is known for her research in the field of neurophysiology pertaining to the role of the hippocampus and medial temporal lobe structures in learning and memory and in spatial representation and navigation.

Buffalo received the Troland Research Award from the National Academy of Sciences in 2011 for "innovative, multidisciplinary study of the hippocampus and the neural basis of memory.” She is a member of the Scientific Advisory Board of Caesar, a neuroscience research institute associated with the Max Planck Society, and the Dana Alliance for Brain Initiatives.

She was elected a member of the National Academy of Sciences in 2022.

== Biography ==
Buffalo attended Wellesley College where she received her bachelor's degree in philosophy in 1992. She completed a research internship in at the National Center for Toxicological Research, Jefferson, Arkansas, where she studies the effects of caffeine and other chemical agents (MK-801) on operant learning in monkeys. Buffalo continued her education at the University of California, San Diego, where she obtained her master's degree in philosophy in 1995, working under the supervision of Patricia Churchland, and her doctorate in neuroscience in 1998, working under the supervision of Stuart Zola and Larry Squire.

Buffalo completed postdoctoral training in neuropsychology at the National Institute of Mental Health, where she worked with Robert Desimone from 1999 to 2005. Buffalo joined the faculty of the department of neurology at the Emory University School of Medicine in 2005 and was appointed to the core faculty of the Division of Neuropharmacology and Neurologic Diseases at the Yerkes National Primate Research Center in 2009.

Buffalo moved to the University of Washington School of Medicine in 2013 with a joint appointment to the Division of Neuroscience of the Washington National Primate Research Center. Her research has been supported by grants from the National Institutes of Health, DARPA, the Simons Foundation, the Charles A. Dana Foundation, and Pfizer.

== Research ==
Buffalo uses a variety of research methods to explore the neural basis of learning and memory, including the innovative use of video games to study the process of memory formation in monkeys. One of her goals has been to elucidate the role of the hippocampus in the development of cognitive maps and other forms of spatial representation and its role in episodic and declarative memory. Her collaborative work with other neuroscientists indicates that the hippocampus encodes a broad range of contextual cues, including temporal and situational information, to support memory for events as well as navigation skills.

Some of Buffalo and her colleagues' work used lesion techniques with monkeys to better understand the role of the hippocampus in recognition and declarative memory. Monkeys subjected to lesions caused by ischemic damage, stereotaxic radio-frequency waves, or selective neurotoxins, like ibotenic acid, that took place at the hippocampus demonstrated impairments of recognition memory, as assessed using the visual paired-comparison task and the delayed non-matching to sample task. The authors concluded that the hippocampus play an essential role in recognition memory, with further work addressing how the hippocampus coordinates its function with other structures, especially the perirhinal cortex. Other work on memory function aims is to identify how changes associated with aging or disease can interfere with memory encoding and retrieval, and how visual processing might provide clues to understanding early cognitive impairment.

== Representative publications ==
- Buffalo, E. A., Bellgowan, P. S., & Martin, A. (2006). Distinct roles for medial temporal lobe structures in memory for objects and their locations. Learning & Memory, 13(5), 638–643.
- Buffalo, E. A., Fries, P., Landman, R., Buschman, T. J., & Desimone, R. (2011). Laminar differences in gamma and alpha coherence in the ventral stream. Proceedings of the National Academy of Sciences, 108(27), 11262–11267.
- Buffalo, E. A., Fries, P., Landman, R., Liang, H., & Desimone, R. (2010). A backward progression of attentional effects in the ventral stream. Proceedings of the National Academy of Sciences, 107(1), 361–365.
- Buffalo, E. A., Reber, P. J., & Squire, L. R. (1998). The human perirhinal cortex and recognition memory. Hippocampus, 8(4), 330–339.
- Killian, N. J., Jutras, M. J., & Buffalo, E. A. (2012). A map of visual space in the primate entorhinal cortex. Nature, 491(7426), 761–764.
- Schmolck, H., Buffalo, E. A., & Squire, L. R. (2000). Memory distortions develop over time: Recollections of the OJ Simpson trial verdict after 15 and 32 months. Psychological Science, 11(1), 39–45.
