= Troland =

Unit of conventional retinal illuminance

The troland (symbol Td), named after Leonard T. Troland, is a unit of conventional retinal illuminance. It is meant as a method for correcting photometric measurements of luminance values impinging on the human eye by scaling them by the effective pupil size. It is equal to retinal illuminance produced by a surface whose luminance is one nit when the apparent area of the entrance pupil of the eye is 1 square millimeter.

The troland unit was proposed in 1916 by Leonard T. Troland, who called it a photon.

The troland typically refers to the ordinary or photopic troland, which is defined in terms of the photopic luminance:

$$T = L \times p ,$$

where L is the photopic luminance in cd⋅m^{−2} and p is pupil area in mm^{2}.

A scotopic troland is also sometimes defined:

$$T' = L' \times p ,$$

where L′ is the scotopic luminance in cd⋅m^{−2} and p is pupil area in mm^{2}.

Although named "retinal illuminance" (and originally named "photon" by Troland), trolands do not measure the actual photon flux incident on the retina; that quantity depends on the specific wavelengths of light that constitute the luminance used in the calculation.

== Units conversion ==
Troland does not directly convert to other units, being a retinal luminance per unit area of a pupil.

However Troland is linked to retinal illuminance in lux = lm/m^{2} as follows. Assuming the corneal luminance L from an extended source, the pupil diameter p and the focal length of the eye F, the retinal luminance is:

Lr [lm/m^{2}] = π ⋅ L / 4 / (f/#)^{2} ≈ π ⋅ L ⋅ p^{2} / 4 / F^{2}.

Multiplying by the pupil area: Trolands [cd/m^{2} ⋅ mm^{2}] = L ⋅ π ⋅ p^{2}/4 = F^{2} ⋅ L_{r} ≈ 289 ⋅ L_{r}.

Alternatively, the retinal illuminance L_{r} [lm/m^{2}] = Trolands / 289 [mm^{2}].

As provided by a more accurate optical calculations, the conversion factor is 278 rather than 289 as demonstrated by simplified considerations above.

Sometimes (by convention only, although not rigorously accurate by definition), retinal luminance is expressed in [cd/m^{2}] = [lm/sr/m^{2}]. Assuming a Lambertian surface, 1 cd/m^{2} = π lm/m^{2} = π lux. That is, 1 [cd/m^{2}] = 289/π [Troland] ≈ 92 [Troland]

== Physical quantities ==
- luminance
- equivalent luminance

== Unit system ==
centimeter–gram–second (CGS)

== Basic unit dimensions ==
[length]^{−2} [luminous intensity]

== Comparisons ==
- ≈ 0.8 × luminance of a kerosene candle (≈ 12000 cd/m^{2} )
- ≈ luminance of a sperm candle (≈ 10000 cd/m^{2} )
- ≈ luminance of an average daytime clear sky (≈ 8000 cd/m^{2})

== See also ==
- Leonard T. Troland
- Troland Research Awards
