= Frank Tong =

Cognitive neuroscientist

Frank Tong is a cognitive neuroscientist and centennial professor of psychology at Vanderbilt University. He grew up in Toronto, Canada. Tong is recognized for his research on the neural bases of human visual perception, visual consciousness, attentional selection, face and object recognition, and visual working memory. In more recent work, he is developing deep neural network models of the human visual system.

== Education ==
Tong received his B.S. in Psychology at Queen's University in Kingston, Canada in 1995, where he worked with Barrie Frost. Tong completed his Ph.D. at Harvard University in 1999 working with Ken Nakayama and Nancy Kanwisher. He completed one year of postdoctoral research with Stephen Engel at the University of California, Los Angeles before beginning his first faculty position as an assistant professor at Princeton University (2000-2004). He moved to Vanderbilt University in 2004 to continue his pursuits of fMRI research, where he is now a Centennial Professor of Psychology.

== Awards and recognition ==
Tong has received the Scientific American 50 Award (2005), Young Investigator Awards from the Cognitive Neuroscience Society (2006) and the Vision Sciences Society (2009), and the Troland Research Award from the National Academy of Sciences "for pioneering the use of neural decoding techniques to explore mechanisms in the human brain mediating perception, attention, and object recognition."

== Representative Publications ==
Tong, F., Nakayama, K., Vaughan, J. T., & Kanwisher, N. (1998). Binocular rivalry and visual awareness in human extrastriate cortex. Neuron, 21, 753-759.

Tong, F., & Engel, S. A. (2001). Interocular rivalry revealed in the human cortical blind-spot representation. Nature, 411, 195-199.

Kamitani, Y., & Tong, F. (2005). Decoding the visual and subjective contents of the human brain. Nature Neuroscience, 8, 679-685.

Harrison, S. A., & Tong, F. (2009). Decoding reveals the contents of visual working memory in early visual areas. Nature, 458, 632-635.

Cohen, E. C., & Tong, F. (2015). Neural mechanisms of object-based attention. Cerebral Cortex, 25(4), 1080-1092.

Ling, S., Pratte, M. S., & Tong, F. (2015). Attention alters orientation processing in the human lateral geniculate nucleus. Nature Neuroscience, 18(4), 496-498.

Jang, H., McCormack, D., & Tong, F. (2021). Noise-trained deep neural networks effectively predict human vision and its neural responses to challenging images. PLoS Biology, 19(12):e3001418, 1-27.
