= Mary C. Potter =

American cognitive scientist

- Born: 1930 (age 95–96); Beirut, Lebanon
- Other name: Molly Potter
- Citizenship: American
- Education: Swarthmore College; Radcliffe College
- Known for: Rapid serial visual presentation
- Spouse: David Potter (1952-2019)
- Awards: Fellow, American Psychological Association; Fellow, Association for Psychological Science; Fellow, Cognitive Science Society; Fellow, Society of Experimental Psychologists; Speaker, Psychonomic Society (2006)
- Scientific career
- Fields: Psychology
- Workplaces: Massachusetts Institute of Technology
- Thesis: Decision-making in a psychophysical situation (1961)
- Doctoral advisor: Jerome Bruner
- Doctoral students: Rhonda Friedman; Nancy Kanwisher; Daphne Bavelier; William Marslen-Wilson
- Website: mollylab-1.mit.edu

Mary Crawford Potter (born 1930) is an American psychologist and emerita professor of cognitive science at the Massachusetts Institute of Technology. She is a Fellow of the American Psychological Association, the Cognitive Science Society, and the Society of Experimental Psychologists.

== Career ==
After gaining her BA degree in 1952, she attended Radcliffe College for her PhD with Jerry Bruner as her advisor. She received a National Science Foundation Graduate Research Fellowship in 1956 and spent two years at University College London. She completed her thesis in 1961, and continued as a part-time postdoctoral researcher at the Center for Cognitive Studies at Harvard with Bruner until 1967. She began to work on rapid serial visual presentation during this time. She was appointed to a full-time position as a lecturer at MIT's department of urban studies and planning and was promoted to associate professor in 1970. She remained at MIT for the rest of her career, transferring to the department of psychology (from 1985 called department of brain and cognitive sciences) in 1975 and later gaining tenure. She was a full professor from 1982. Potter retired in 2015.

Potter was among the scientists who discovered and initially studied Patient HM. Potter's research and the classes she taught at MIT focused on experimental methods to study human cognition, thereby revealing the implicit data structures and algorithms used by the human brain. She was particularly interested in rapid visual processing especially while reading or viewing pictures or scenes. She was the first to work on rapid serial visual presentation and developed the methodologies to study its first second. She discovered that people grasp the meaning of phrases and pictures within fractions of second, with pictures understood faster than writing. This is faster than memories can form and implies that this understanding is language-independent.

Potter was chair of the MIT faculty from 1985 until 1987 and was a member of the Committee of Women Faculty in the school of science between 1994 and 1998. In 1994, Potter was one of 16 women faculty in the School of Science at MIT who drafted and co-signed a letter to the then-Dean of Science (now Chancellor of Berkeley) Robert Birgeneau, which started a campaign to highlight and challenge gender discrimination at MIT.

== Early and personal life ==
Potter was born in Beirut, Lebanon, in 1930. Her father was a university administrator at the American University of Beirut and her mother was trained as a nurse. In 1941, she moved with her mother and two siblings to Sackville, New Brunswick, Canada, to stay with her mother's family until the Second World War ended. They travelled via Jerusalem, Sri Lanka, Australia and islands in the Pacific Ocean to Los Angeles, US. Her father remained in Cairo working for the Office of Strategic Services. She returned to Beirut for 10th grade and then spent two years of high school at Northfield School for Girls in Massachusetts, USA. She then attended Swarthmore College, USA for a BA in psychology.

While she was an undergraduate she met David Potter and married him in 1952. He was a postdoctoral researcher while she was a postgraduate at University College London for two years. Their first child, Camilla, was born in London in 1958 and a further three (Mark, Sarah and Robert) after they returned to the USA.

== Awards ==
In 2017 she received the Norman Anderson Lifetime Achievement Award from the Society of Experimental Psychologists "for her ground-breaking and impactful discoveries about the human mind's ability to rapidly extract meaning from words, images and visual scenes".

== Publications ==
Among Potter's most significant publications are:

- Potter, M.C., Wyble, B., Hagmann, C.E., & McCourt, E.S. (2014). Detecting meaning in RSVP at 13 ms per picture. Attention, Perception, and Psychophysics 76, 270–279.
- Potter, M. C., & Fox, L. F. (2009). Detecting and remembering simultaneous pictures in RSVP. Journal of Experimental Psychology: Human Perception and Performance, 35, 28-38.
- Meng, M., & Potter, M. C. (2008). Detecting and remembering pictures with and without visual noise. Journal of Vision, 30, 8(9):7, 1-10 .
- Potter, M. C., Staub, A., & O'Connor, D. H. (2004). Pictorial and conceptual representation of glimpsed pictures. Journal of Experimental Psychology: Human Perception and Performance, 30, 478-489.
