= Current Directions in Psychological Science =

- Discipline: Psychology
- Language: English
- Edited by: Robert Goldstone

Publication details
- History: 1992-present
- Publisher: SAGE Publications for the Association for Psychological Science (United States)
- Frequency: Bi-monthly
- Impact factor: 4.673 (2017)

Standard abbreviations
- ISO 4: Curr. Dir. Psychol. Sci.

Indexing
- ISSN: 0963-7214 (print); 1467-8721 (web)
- LCCN: 93660034
- OCLC no.: 25768799

Links
- Journal homepage; Online access; Online archive

Current Directions in Psychological Science is a bimonthly peer-reviewed scientific journal from the Association for Psychological Science (APS) that is published by SAGE Publications.

== Publication Scope ==
Current Directions in Psychological Science publishes concise reviews by leading experts spanning all of scientific psychology and its applications. The reviews published in this journal cover diverse topics such as language, memory and cognition, development, the neural basis of behavior and emotions, various aspects of psychopathology, and theory of mind. These articles allow readers to stay apprised of important developments across subfields beyond their areas of expertise and bodies of research they might not otherwise be aware of. The articles in Current Directions are also written to be accessible to non-experts, making them suitable for use in the classroom as teaching supplements. The current editor of the journal is Robert Goldstone at Indiana University Bloomington.

== Characteristics ==
Current Directions in Psychological Science is ranked among the top 10 psychology journals worldwide. Published bimonthly, the journal appears online and in print with online articles appearing weekly on the journal website. Manuscripts for this journal are accepted by invitation or pre-submission query only. In addition to a large number of institutional subscribers worldwide, the 25,000 members of the Association for Psychological Science receive the journal as part of their membership

== Past Editors ==
The journal was co-founded by Sandra Scarr of University of Virginia, and Charles R. Gallistel of Rutgers University. Other former editors include Harry Reis (University of Rochester); Alan E. Kazdin (Yale University); Milton D. Hakel (University of Memphis); Emanuel Donchin (University of South Florida); Randall Engle (Georgia Institute of Technology).

== Special Issues ==
Occasionally, special issues or sections of this journal are published to address specific topics or trends in psychological science.

- Psychology and Law
- Schizophrenia
- Neuroscience
- Teen Brain
