= Roozbeh Kiani =

Iranian-American neuroscientist

- Born: Amol, Iran
- Education: University of Washington; Stanford
- Awards: International Chemistry Olympiad Gold Medal (1995); Donald B. Lindsley Prize in Behavioral Neuroscience (2010); Sloan Research Fellowship (2014); Pew Scholar in Biomedical Sciences (2016); McKnight Scholar Award (2016); Troland Research Award (2022)
- Scientific career
- Fields: Neuroscience; Cognitive psychology
- Workplaces: NYU
- Thesis: Bounded accumulation of evidence in parietal cortex: A flexible neural mechanism for making decisions and estimating certainty (2009)
- Doctoral advisor: Michael Shadlen
- Other academic advisors: William Newsome; Hossein Esteky; Keiji Tanaka
- Website: https://as.nyu.edu/faculty/roozbeh-kiani.html

Roozbeh Kiani is an Iranian-American neuroscientist whose research focuses on how the brain makes decisions under uncertainty. He is a professor of Neural Science and Psychology at New York University (NYU), where he directs the Perceptual and Mnemonic Decision-Making Lab at the Center for Neural Science. Kiani's work has investigated how the brain integrates evidence over time, encodes decision confidence, and flexibly adapts decision-making strategies to changing contexts.

== Early life and education ==
Kiani was born and raised in Amol, Iran. He was awarded the top gold medal at the 27th International Chemistry Olympiad in Beijing, China. After completing high school, Kiani pursued medicine at Shahid Beheshti University of Medical Sciences in Tehran, while cultivating his interests in the neural basis of vision and cognition. He moved to the United States and joined the University of Washington, where he earned a Ph.D. under the mentorship of Michael Shadlen. Following his Ph.D., Kiani conducted postdoctoral research with William T. Newsome at Stanford University, further developing neurophysiological and behavioral paradigms to probe decision-making circuits in primates

== Academic career and research ==
Kiani joined the faculty at New York University in 2013 and is currently a professor in the Center for Neural Science, with an affiliated appointment with the Department of Psychology. His research explores how the brain accumulates information, estimates uncertainty, and makes decisions that are both flexible and robust in the face of environmental change. Kiani's work integrates electrophysiology, neurostimulation, psychophysics, and computational modeling.

His work on decision confidence has shown how cortical neurons encode internal estimates of choice reliability and use them to guide subsequent behavior. His studies of confidence-dependent hierarchical decision making have shown multiscale integration processes that interact to shape behavior and have revealed how contextual cues dynamically reshape population-level neural representations. Kiani has contributed to the development of causal perturbation methods to control neural population activity to shape behavior. Earlier in his career, he studied object recognition, demonstrating that neurons in inferotemporal (IT) cortex represent object categories.

Since 2024, Kiani has co-directed the Methods in Computational Neuroscience course at the Marine Biological Laboratory in Woods Hole.

From 2020 to 2025, Kiani was a member of the Board of Scientific Counselors at the National Eye Institute.

== Awards ==
- 1995, Gold Medal and Top Score, 27th International Chemistry Olympiad
- 2010, Donald B. Lindsley Prize in Behavioral Neuroscience
- 2014, Alfred P. Sloan Research Fellowship
- 2016, McKnight Scholar Award
- 2016, Pew Scholar in Biomedical Sciences
- 2022, Troland Research Award, National Academy of Sciences
- 2023, Pew Innovation Fund Award (2023)

== Personal life ==
Kiani advocates for academic freedom and human rights, and has contributed to conversations around global science and political risk.
