= Steven J. Luck =

American neuroscientist

- Education: University of California, San Diego
- Scientific career
- Fields: Neuroscience Psychology Human electrophysiology
- Thesis: (1993)

Steven J. Luck is an American cognitive neuroscientist and distinguished professor of psychology at The University of California, San Diego (UCSD).

== Education and Career ==
Steven Luck received a Bachelor's of Art in psychology from Reed College in 1986 and went on to earn a Master's of Science in neurosciences from UCSD in 1989 and a Ph.D. in Neurosciences in 1993 from UCSD. Luck continued as a research assistant until 1994 before accepting a professorship at the University of Iowa until 2006. Luck currently holds the position of distinguished professor at the University of California, Davis.

== Research ==
Luck's primary research focus is in cognitive neuroscience. Luck co-developed and maintains ERPLAB and hosts an annual 10-day ERP Boot Camp with Emily Kappenman, designed to train researchers at any level on the fundamentals of event-related potentials. Luck has published extensive academic literature with over 180 articles accumulating over 29,000 citations

== Awards ==
- "Steven J. Luck: Award for Distinguished Scientific Early Career Contributions to Psychology". American Psychologist. 54 (11): 904–907. November 1999. doi:10.1037/h0088194. ISSN 1935-990X.
- 2012 - Fellow of the American Association for the Advancement of Science (AAAS):For his work in attention and visual memory.
- 2001 - Troland Research Awards, United States National Academy of Sciences: For his pathbreaking behavioral, psychophysical, and physiological studies of attention and visual memory.

== Selected Publications ==
=== Books ===
- Luck, S. J. (2022). Applied event-related potential data analysis. LibreTexts, 10(1), 5.
- Luck, S. J. (2014). An introduction to the event-related potential technique. MIT press.
- Luck, S. J., & Kappenman, E. S. (Eds.). (2011). The Oxford handbook of event-related potential components. Oxford university press.

=== Software ===
- Lopez-Calderon, Javier; Luck, Steven J. (April 14, 2014). "ERPLAB: an open-source toolbox for the analysis of event-related potentials". Frontiers in Human Neuroscience. 8: 213. doi:10.3389/fnhum.2014.00213. ISSN 1662-5161. PMC 3995046. PMID 24782741.

=== Academic Papers ===
- Zhang, Weiwei; Luck, Steven J. (May 2008). "Discrete fixed-resolution representations in visual working memory". Nature. 453 (7192): 233–235. Bibcode:2008Natur.453..233Z. doi:10.1038/nature06860. ISSN 1476-4687. PMC 2588137. PMID 18385672.
- Vogel, Ek; Ek, S.J. (2000). "The visual N1 component as an index of a discrimination process". Psychophysiology. 37 (2): 190–203. doi:10.1111/1469-8986.3720190. PMID 10731769.
- Luck, Steven J.; Vogel, Edward K. (November 1997). "The capacity of visual working memory for features and conjunctions". Nature. 390 (6657): 279–281. Bibcode:1997Natur.390..279L. doi:10.1038/36846. ISSN 1476-4687. PMID 9384378.
