= Andrew Coburn (catastrophe modeller) =

Andrew William Coburn (born 1956 in Chester, England) is known in the discipline of catastrophe modeling and is the director of the external advisory board for the Centre for Risk Studies at the University of Cambridge. He is a senior vice president at Risk Management Solutions and oversees the model development carried out in the RMS LifeRisks team.

After training in architecture at Christ's College at the University of Cambridge, Coburn completed a PhD thesis in July 1987 on Seismic vulnerability and risk reduction strategies for housing in Eastern Turkey. Coburn has also worked extensively with Robert Spence (engineer), the director of CURBE (the Cambridge University Centre for Risk in the Built Environment).

Coburn has studied many natural and man-made catastrophe events, including earthquakes, volcanic eruptions, tsunamis, terrorist attacks and disease pandemics. He is one of the leading contributors to the creation of the class of catastrophe models that over the past 20 years has come to be an accepted part both of business management in financial services and of public policy making for societal risk.

Coburn's field damage surveys include Irpinia in Italy, the Spitak in Armenia, Mexico City, Erzurum-Kars in Turkey, San‘ā' (Arabic: صنعاء) in Yemen, Luzon, Philippines, Gujarat in India, Kobe in Japan, and New Orleans in the aftermath of Hurricane Katrina.

== Personal life ==
Coburn married Helen Mulligan in 1987; they have a son and a daughter and lives near Cambridge, England.

== Publications ==
- Earthquake Protection with Robin Spence, ISBN 0-470-84923-1
- Technical principles of building for safety with Richard Hughes, Antonios Pomonis and Robin Spence, ISBN 1-85339-182-4
- Gypsum Plaster: Its manufacture and use with Eric Dudley and Robin Spence, ISBN 1-85339-038-0

=== Consultations ===
- How to Survive Bird Flu, ISBN 978-0-7858-2180-9

==== Children's books ====
- Earthquakes and Volcanoes, ISBN 1-59223-379-1
- Earthquake!, ISBN 0-7496-6921-7
- Hurricane!, ISBN 0-7496-6924-1
