= Kathryn Schulz =

American journalist and author

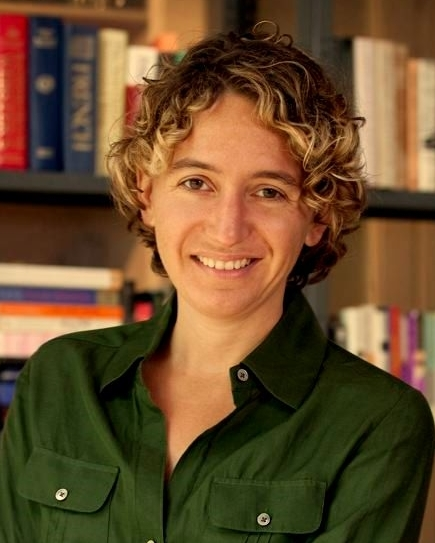
- Schulz in 2010
- Born: Shaker Heights, Ohio, U.S.
- Education: Brown University (BA)
- Occupation: Journalist
- Relatives: Laura Schulz (sister)
- Writing career
- Genre: Non-fiction
- Notable awards: Pulitzer Prize for Feature Writing (2016); Lambda Literary Award for Lesbian Memoir or Biography (2023)

Kathryn Schulz is an American journalist and author. She is a staff writer at The New Yorker. In 2016, she won the Pulitzer Prize for Feature Writing for her article on the risk of a major earthquake and tsunami in the Pacific Northwest. In 2023, she won the Lambda Literary Award for Lesbian Memoir or Biography.

== Biography ==
Schulz was born in Shaker Heights, Ohio, to teacher Margot Schulz and lawyer Isaac Schulz. Her sister is the MIT cognitive scientist Laura Schulz. Schulz has described her family as "a fiercely intellectual family that is very interested in ideas". Schulz graduated from Shaker Heights High School in 1992. She then attended Brown University, graduating with a Bachelor of Arts with a major in history in 1996.

After graduation Schulz planned to take a year off before pursuing a Ph.D.; she lived in Portland, Oregon briefly before moving to Costa Rica with her sister's family. Seeking to remain in Latin America and use her Spanish, Schulz became an editor and reporter at The Santiago Times. Through the experience she "realized that [her] attraction to ideas could be pursued without returning to academia." She returned to the United States in 2001, moving to New York City to work for Grist.

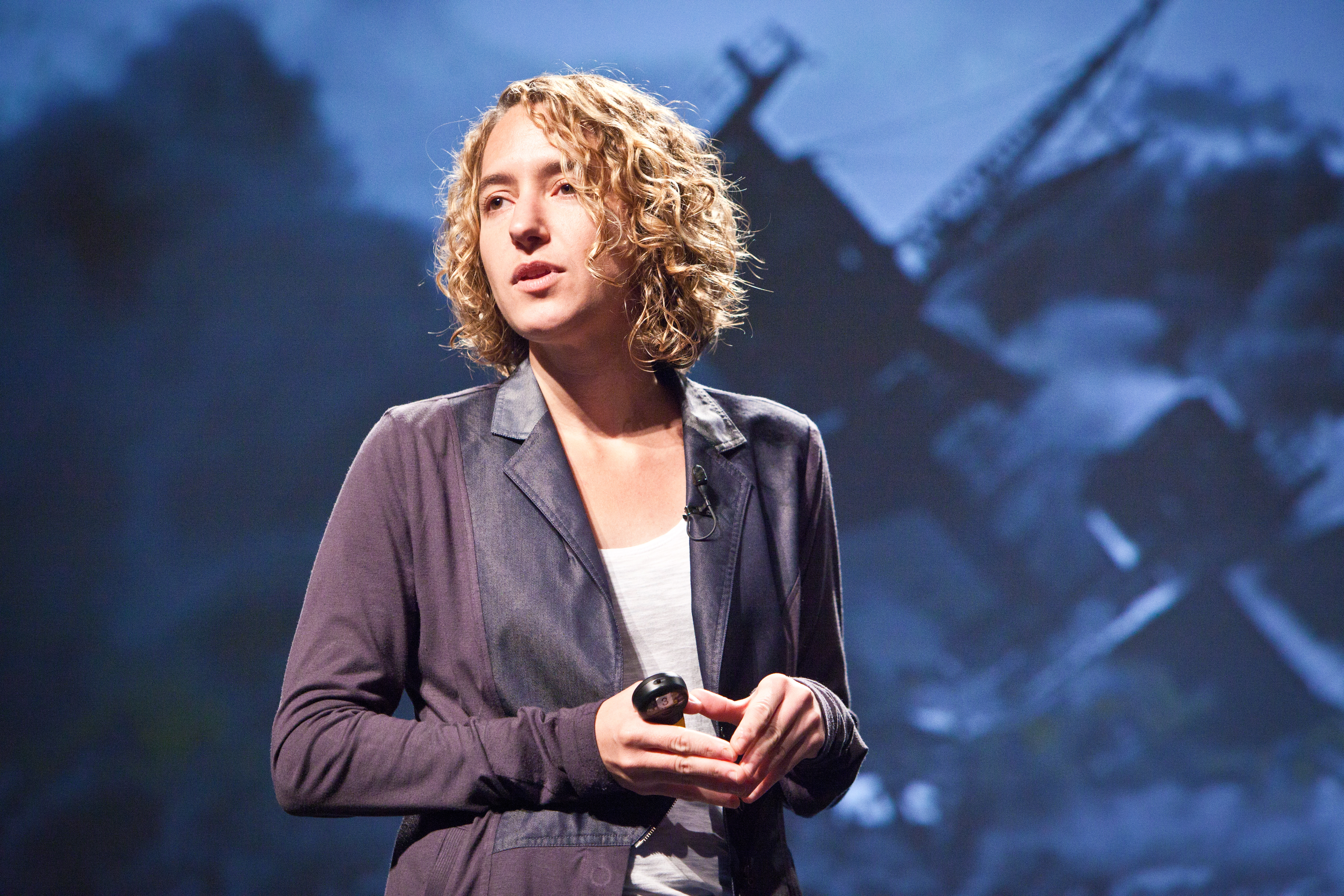
Schulz in 2010

In 2015, Schulz became a staff writer for The New Yorker, where she has written about everything from the legacy of an early Muslim immigrant in Wyoming to the radical life of civil rights activist Pauli Murray to Henry David Thoreau's Walden to brown marmorated stinkbugs. In 2016, she won the Pulitzer Prize for feature writing and a National Magazine Award for "The Really Big One", her story on seismic risk in the Pacific Northwest.

Previously, she was the book critic for the biweekly magazine New York.

She is the author of the book Being Wrong: Adventures in the Margin of Error. Her second book, Lost & Found, was published by Random House on January 11, 2022.

Schulz was a 2004 recipient of the Pew Fellowship in International Journalism (now the International Reporting Project), and has reported from throughout Central and South America, Japan and the Middle East.

== Reviews and honors ==
In 2016, Schulz won the Pulitzer Prize and the National Magazine Award for "The Really Big One", an article about seismic risk in the Pacific Northwest. She was also a finalist for the 2017 National Magazine Award for "When Things Go Missing", an essay about loss and the death of her father.

Reviewing her book Being Wrong: Adventures in the Margin of Error (2010), Dwight Garner wrote: "Ms. Schulz's book is a funny and philosophical meditation on why error is mostly a humane, courageous and extremely desirable human trait. She flies high in the intellectual skies, leaving beautiful sunlit contrails." Daniel Gilbert described her as "a warm, witty and welcome presence who confides in her readers rather than lecturing them. It doesn't hurt that she combines lucid prose with perfect comic timing".

Her writing has appeared in The Best American Essays, The Best American Travel Writing, The Best American Food Writing, and The Best American Science Writing.

== Personal life ==
Schulz is married to Casey Cep, a fellow staff writer at The New Yorker; Schulz wrote about falling in love with her in Lost & Found. They live with their two young daughters on the Eastern Shore of Maryland, near where Cep grew up.

== Bibliography ==
=== Books ===
- Being Wrong : Adventures in the Margin of Error. Ecco/HarperCollins. 2010.
- Lost & Found : A Memoir. Random House. 2022.

=== Essays and reporting ===
- “Did Antidepressants Depress Japan?”, The New York Times Magazine, August 22, 2004
- "Being Left: Reflections on Love and Politics", The Nation, December 20, 2004
- “Brave Neuro World”, The Nation, January 9, 2006
- “Billy Jean in Baghdad”, The Huffington Post, November 16, 2009
- “Life in Hell”, Foreign Policy, January 12, 2010
- “Thanks for Admitting the Blindingly Obvious”, The New York Times, June 8, 2010
- “The Bright Side of Wrong”, The Boston Globe, June 13, 2010
- The United Mistakes of America (July 28, 2010). The New York Times Freakonomics Blog.
- Schulz: Why I Despise The Great Gatsby (May 6, 2013) New York.
- A Visit With the Missoula Motel-Keeper Who Sheltered a Hemingway (June 3, 2014). New York.
- Final Forms (April 7, 2014). The New Yorker.
- On “Wintry Mix” (February 2, 2015). The New Yorker.
- How to Train Your Raptor (March 2, 2015) The New Yorker.
- A Beginner’s Guide to Invisibility (April 6, 2015) The New Yorker.
- What Part of "No, Totally?" Don't You Understand? (April 7, 2015). The New Yorker.
- "Sight unseen : the hows and whys of invisibility". The Critics. A Critic at Large. The New Yorker. 91 (8): 75–79. April 13, 2015.
- "Outside in : Nell Zink turned her back on the publishing world. It found her anyway". Life and Letters. The New Yorker. 91 (13): 38–45. May 18, 2015.
- "The really big one : an earthquake will destroy a sizable portion of the coastal Northwest. The question is when". Annals of Seismology. The New Yorker. 91 (20): 52–59. July 20, 2015. (Note: Title in the online table of contents is "The earthquake that will devastate the Pacific Northwest".)
- How to Stay Safe When the Big One Comes (July 28, 2015). The New Yorker.
- The Moral Judgments of Henry David Thoreau (October 15, 2015). The New Yorker.
- "Pond Scum", The New Yorker, October 19, 2015
- What We Think About When We Run (November 3, 2015). The New Yorker.
- "Writers in the Storm: How Weather Went from Symbol to Science and Back Again". A Critic at Large. The New Yorker. 91 (37): 105–110. November 23, 2015. (Note: Title in the online table of contents is "Talk about the weather".)
- "Dead Certainty: How ‘Making a Murderer’ goes wrong", The New Yorker, January 25, 2016
- The Perilous Lure of the Underground Railroad (August 15, 2016). The New Yorker.
- The Really Small Ones (November 4, 2016). The New Yorker.
- Citizen Kahn (June 6, 2016). The New Yorker.
- When Things Go Missing (February 13, 2017). The New Yorker.
- What Calling Congress Achieves (March 6, 2017). The New Yorker.
- The Many Lives of Pauli Murray (April 17, 2017). The New Yorker.
- "Polar expressed : what if an ancient story about the Far North came true?". The Critics. A Critic at Large. The New Yorker. 93 (10): 88–95. April 24, 2017. (Note: Online version is titled "Literature’s Arctic obsession".)
- How to be a Know-It-All (October 16, 2017). The New Yorker.
- "Fantastic beasts and how to rank them : they may not exist, but they tell us a lot about the human mind". Dept. of Speculation. The New Yorker. 93 (35): 24–28. November 6, 2017.
- The Lost Giant of American Literature (January 29, 2018). The New Yorker.
- When Twenty-Six Thousand Stinkbugs Invade Your Home (March 12, 2018). The New Yorker.
- Why Two Chefs in Small-Town Utah Are Battling President Trump (October 1, 2019) The New Yorker.
- My Father’s Stack of Books (March 18, 2019). The New Yorker.
- Oregon’s Tsunami Risk: Between the Devil and the Deep Blue Sea (July 1, 2019). The New Yorker.
- "How we became infected by chain e-mail : like a virus, its sole purpose is replication". Cultural Comment. The New Yorker. May 15, 2020. (Note: Available on website only.)
- "Where the wild things go : how animals navigate the world". Dept. of Science. The New Yorker. 97 (7): 22–27. April 5, 2021. (Note: Online version is titled "Why animals don't get lost".)
- "Good times : in Jonathan Franzen's 'Crossroads,' a minister and his family confront a crisis of faith—not in God but in one another". The Critics. Books. The New Yorker. 97 (31): 62–68. October 4, 2021. (Note: Online version is titled "The church of Jonathan Franzen".)

=== Book reviews ===
Date	Review article	Work(s) reviewed
18 November 2003	"Kathryn Schulz reviews Monster of God by David Quammen". Grist. 18 November 2003.	Quammen, David (2003). Monster of God : the man-eating predator in the jungles of history and the mind. New York: W. W. Norton.

———————
