= Geoffrey F. Woodman =

Neuroscientist

Geoffrey F. Woodman is a professor of psychology at Vanderbilt University and the E. Bronson Ingram Chair of Neuroscience. He is a member of the Vanderbilt Vision Research Center and Center for Integrative & Cognitive Neuroscience.

In 2016, Woodman received the Troland Research award from the National Academy of Sciences.
