= Leah Somerville =

American psychologist

Leah H. Somerville
- Education: University of Wisconsin–Madison; Dartmouth College
- Scientific career
- Workplaces: Harvard University
- Thesis: Physiological and neural mechanisms of anxiety, negativity, and threat. (2008)

Leah H. Somerville is an American psychologist who is a professor at Harvard University. She is a member of the Human Connectome Project. Somerville was awarded the 2022 National Academy of Sciences Troland Research Award.

== Early life and education ==
Somerville became interested in adolescent neurodevelopment due to her own experiences as a teenager. She spent four years volunteering as a teen crisis counsellor, and intended to pursue a career in social work. Whilst an undergraduate at the University of Wisconsin, she became interested in affective neuroscience. Somerville was eventually a doctoral student at Dartmouth College, where she studied the neural mechanisms of anxiety, negativity and threat. After earning her doctoral degree, Somerville joined the Sackler Institute for Developmental Biology. During her postdoc she looked to combine an appreciation of development into emotion.

== Research and career ==
In 2012, Somerville joined the Department of Psychology at Harvard University, where she leads the Affective Neuroscience & Development Laboratory in the Center for Brain Science. Her research considers human emotion and the factors that explain variability in how people respond to emotions. Somerville is interested in how brain development influences psychological functioning. She has also studied how brain and psychological development interact during human adolescence. She believes that dynamic trajectories of brain development shape the interplay between these processes.

Somerville was made an endowed Professor at Harvard University in 2021. Somerville was awarded a Troland Research Award from the National Academy of Sciences in 2022.

== Awards and honors ==
- 2014 American Psychological Foundation FJ McGuigan Early Career Research Prize for Understanding the Human Mind
- 2014 American Psychological Association Janet Taylor Spence Award for Transformative Early Career Contributions
- 2022 National Academy of Sciences Troland Research Award

== Selected publications ==
- Leah H Somerville; Rebecca M Jones; B J Casey (August 19, 2009). "A time of change: behavioral and neural correlates of adolescent sensitivity to appetitive and aversive environmental cues". Brain and Cognition. 72 (1): 124–133. doi:10.1016/j.bandc.2009.07.003. ISSN 0278-2626. PMC 2814936. PMID 19695759. Wikidata Q33624337.
- Paul J Whalen; Jerome Kagan; Robert G Cook; et al. (December 1, 2004). "Human amygdala responsivity to masked fearful eye whites". Science. 306 (5704): 2061. doi:10.1126/science.1103617. ISSN 0036-8075. PMID 15604401. Wikidata Q50983697.
- B J Casey; Leah H Somerville; Ian H Gotlib; et al. (September 6, 2011). "Behavioral and neural correlates of delay of gratification 40 years later". Proceedings of the National Academy of Sciences of the United States of America. 108 (36): 14998–5003. Bibcode:2011PNAS..10814998C. doi:10.1073/pnas.1108561108. ISSN 0027-8424. PMC 3169162. PMID 21876169. Wikidata Q24601241.
