= The Academy of Experts =

UK legal institute for expert witnesses

The Academy of Experts (TAE; formerly the British Academy of Experts) is a UK legal institute for expert witnesses. It was founded in 1987 with the objective of providing a professional body for experts to establish and promote high objective standards.

Although there is representation on the Academy’s Council from the legal profession the majority of the officers, including the Chairman, are practising Experts.

The President of The Academy is currently The Lord Neuberger of Abbotsbury. Past Presidents include The Lord Saville of Newdigate, the UK politician and former Chancellor of the Exchequer The Lord Howe of Aberavon and The Lord Slynn of Hadley.

As a multi-disciplinary body TAE works with professional bodies around the world advising and supporting their Expert Witness practices. In partnership with the Institute of Chartered Accountants in England and Wales TAE publishes the Register of Accredited Accountant Expert Witnesses.

The association awards four grades of membership the highest of which is Fellowship, which entitles the holder to use the post nominal letters FAE.

== Standards ==
In 2005 the Code of Practice for Experts was endorsed for by the Master of the Rolls, Lord Phillips of Worth Matravers. The code is cited in the Northern Ireland Rules on Expert Evidence PD 1 of 2015.
