= Pawan Sinha =

- Education: Massachusetts Institute of Technology, Indian Institute of Technology, Delhi, University of California, Berkeley
- Awards: Troland Research Awards in 2007, Presidential Early Career Award for Scientists and Engineers in 2012
- Scientific career
- Fields: Neuroscience, Cognitive Science, Artificial Intelligence
- Workplaces: Massachusetts Institute of Technology

Pawan Sinha is a Cambridge-based scientist who won the Presidential Early Career Award for Scientists and Engineers in 2012 . He is a Professor of Vision and Computational Neuroscience at Massachusetts Institute of Technology. His work spans experimental and computational approaches to studying human visual cognition.

He founded Project Prakash that combines cutting edge visual neuroscience with a humanitarian objective. Project Prakash sets up eye-care camps in some of the most habitually underserved regions of India, and since 2003 gives free eye-health screenings to more than 700 functionally blind children. The children are treated without charge, even those unsuitable for Sinha's research. His work has been featured in leading media, most notably for answering Molyneux's problem. He is one of the few scientists interviewed on Charlie Rose.
