= Asif A. Ghazanfar =

American neuroscientist (born 1972)

Asif A. Ghazanfar (born 20 April 1972) is an American neuroscientist. He received one of the two Troland Research Awards for 2013.

He was born in Pullman, Washington. He graduated from University of Idaho with a degree in philosophy in 1994 and received his Ph.D from Duke University in 1999.

He is a member of the Editorial Board for Current Biology, and co-director (with Gavin Steingo) of The Animal Song Collective. Based at Princeton University, the project brings together humanists and scientists to explore the very idea of “animal song” from a cross-disciplinary and collaborative perspective.

He was the head of the Princeton University residential college Yeh College.
