= Robert Spence (engineer) =

British engineer (1933–2024)

- Born: 11 July 1933; Hull, England
- Died: 20 September 2024 (aged 91)
- Occupation: Professor emeritus
- Known for: Work in the field of information visualization

Academic background
- Education: BSc, DIC, PhD, DSc, DrRCA
- Alma mater: University of London

Academic work
- Discipline: Information engineering
- Sub-discipline: Information visualization
- Institutions: Imperial College London
- Website: http://www.ee.ic.ac.uk/r.spence/

Robert Spence (11 July 1933 – 20 September 2024) was a British engineer who was a professor emeritus and senior research investigator at the Imperial College London, known for his work in the field of information visualization.

== Biography ==
Born in Hull, England, Spence received his BSc in engineer in 1954 from the University of London, his Diploma of Imperial College from Imperial College, London in 1955, and in 1959 his PhD in engineering from the University of London. In 1983, he obtained a DSc in engineering from the University of London, and in 1997 a higher doctorate from the Royal College of Art. He was awarded a second DSc from Imperial College London in 2018 for his work in Interactive Visual Artefacts.

Spence spent his academic career at the Department of Electrical Engineering of the Imperial College London, where he had started in 1958 as research assistant. In 1962, he became lecturer, in 1968 reader, and in 1984 professor of information engineering. From 2000 he was a professor emeritus and senior research investigator. He has been visiting professor at the University of Ljubljana, Yugoslavia; at the Nanjing Institute of Technology, China; at the University of Canterbury, New Zealand since 2002; and since 2003 at the Business School, University of Manchester. From 2007 he was also an honorary professor at the University of Waikato, New Zealand.

Notable contributions in the field of engineering included the generalized form of Tellegen's theorem and algorithms for improving the manufacturing yield of mass-produced circuits. In the field of human–computer interaction, Spence created the first focus+context technique called the Bifocal Display which later led to fisheye views used in information visualization. Spence's innovations include many novel tools for design. One example is the Influence Explorer which proposed and demonstrated an interactive way for designers to select parameters and evaluate hundreds of variant designs in a matter of minutes.

Interactive computer graphics contributions from the late 1960s include ways for electronic circuit designers to sketch a circuit diagram on a computer display. Another key research direction was the topic of rapid serial visual presentation, in which a collection of images is presented sequentially and rapidly to help users find an image of interest.

Spence died on 20 September 2024, at the age of 91.

== Awards ==
Spence was elected fellow of the Institute of Electrical and Electronics Engineers (IEEE) in 1976; fellow of the City and Guilds of London Institute in 1989; and fellow of the Royal Academy of Engineering in 1990. In 1995, he was awarded Officier dans l’Ordre des Palmes académiques bestowed by the French President, and in 1999 he received the Golden Jubilee Award from the IEEE Circuits and Systems Society. In 2020, he was elected to the IEEE Visualization Academy.

== Selected publications ==
- Penfield, Paul, Robert Spence, and Simon Duinker. Tellegen's theorem and electrical networks. Vol. 58. MIT Press (MA), 1970.
- Spence, Robert, and Randeep Singh Soin. Tolerance design of electronic circuits. Vol. 16. New York: Addison-Wesley, 1988.
- Spence, Robert, and A. Press. "Information visualization." (2000).

Articles, a selection:

- Spence, Robert, and Mark Apperley. "Data base navigation: an office environment for the professional." Behaviour & Information Technology 1.1 (1982): 43-54.
- Tweedie, L., Spence, R., Dawkes, H., & Su, H. (1996, April). "Externalising abstract mathematical models." In Proceedings of the SIGCHI Conference on Human Factors in Computing Systems (pp. 406-ff). ACM.
- Spence, Robert. "A framework for navigation." International Journal of Human-Computer Studies 51.5 (1999): 919-945.
