= Robert Nosofsky =

American physiologist (born 1958)

Robert M. Nosofsky
- Born: c. 1956 (age 69–70)
- Education: Binghamton University (B.A.), Harvard University (Ph.D.)
- Scientific career
- Fields: Cognitive science, psychology
- Workplaces: Indiana University, Bloomington
- Thesis: Attention, Similarity, and the Identification-Categorization Relationship (1984)
- Doctoral advisors: William Kaye Estes; R. Duncan Luce

Robert Mark Nosofsky (born c. 1956) is an American psychologist. He is a professor in the department of psychological and brain sciences at Indiana University Bloomington, who is known for his exemplar theory. His research interest are categorization, recognition memory, math modeling, combining formal modeling and FMRI Studies. His research is in the development and testing of formal mathematical models of perceptual category learning and representation.

== Life and education ==
Nosofsky was born in U.S.A. He graduated with a B.A. in psychology and mathematics at Binghamton University in 1978 and a Ph.D. in psychology at Harvard University in 1984.

== Exemplar theory ==
The exemplar theory, which was proposed by Robert Nosofsky is different from the prototype theory, proposed by Eleanor Rosch. According to the exemplar theory, the human cognition of concept categories is based on the use of exemplars of concepts. The exemplar theory explains how the human beings learn and use these concept categories.

== Awards and honors ==
Nosofsky received the first New Investigator Research Award of the Society of Mathematical Psychology (1987), APA's Distinguished Scientific Award for Early Career Contribution to Psychology (1993), and the Troland Award from the National Academy of Sciences (1995). He was elected to the Society of Experimental Psychologists, the leading honorary society in the field, in 1998. In January, he accepted the editorship of the Psychonomic Bulletin & Review.

== Works ==
- Nosofsky, R.M., Sanders, C., Meagher, B.J., & Douglas, B.J (2017). Toward the development of a feature-space representation for a complex natural category domain. Behavior Research Methods
- Nosofsky, R.M., Sanders, C., Gerdom, A., Douglas, B., & McDaniel, M. (2017). On learning natural science categories that violate the family-resemblance principle. Psychological Science, 28, 104-114
- Nosofsky, R.M., & Donkin, C. (2016). Qualitative contrast between knowledge-limited mixed-state and variable-resources models of visual change detection. Journal of Experimental Psychology: Learning, Memory, and Cognition, 42, 1507-1525
- Nosofsky, R. M. (2016). An exemplar-retrieval model of short-term memory search: Linking categorization and probe recognition. Psychology of Learning and Motivation, 65, 47-84

== See also ==
- Exemplar theory
- Prototype theory
