= List of TED speakers =

This is a partial list of people who have spoken or otherwise presented at official TED conferences such as TED, TED@, TEDActive, TEDCity, TED-Ed, TED-NY, TEDGlobal, TEDSummit, TEDIndia, TEDSalon, TEDWomen, TEDYouth, TED Fellows Retreat, and TED Talks Education. It also includes speakers at the independent TEDMED conferences. Talks from the independent TEDx conferences are not included since there are thousands of such events (over 11,000 held and over 1,100 upcoming as of January 2021) making them less notable. The TED.com website also hosts videos from conferences not affiliated with TED, but those talks and speakers are not included in this list.

== A ==
Speaker	Talk(s)
Trevor Aaronson	How this FBI strategy is actually creating US-based terrorists (TED2015)
Chris Abani	Telling stories from Africa (TEDGlobal 2007); On humanity (TED2008)
Hawa Abdi	Mother and daughter doctor-heroes (TEDWomen 2010)
Marc Abrahams	A science award that makes you laugh, then think (TEDMED 2014)
J. J. Abrams	The mystery box (TED2007)
José Antonio Abreu	The El Sistema music revolution (TED2009)
Chimamanda Ngozi Adichie	The danger of a single story (TEDGlobal 2009)
Newton Aduaka	The story of Ezra (TEDGlobal 2007)
Anant Agarwal	Why massive open online courses (still) matter (TED2013)
Shai Agassi	A new ecosystem for electric cars (TED2009)
Blaise Agüera y Arcas	How PhotoSynth can connect the world's images (TED2007); Augmented-reality maps (TED2010)
David Agus	A new strategy in the war on cancer (TEDMED 2009)
Omar Ahmad	Political change with pen and paper (TED2010)
Al-Mayassa bint Hamad bin Khalifa Al-Thani	Globalizing the local, localizing the global (TEDWomen 2010)
Manal al-Sharif	A Saudi woman who dared to drive (TEDGlobal 2013)
Madeleine Albright	On being a woman and a diplomat (TEDWomen 2010)
Zeresenay Alemseged	The search for humanity's roots (TEDGlobal 2007)
Joey Alexander	An 11-year-old prodigy performs old-school jazz (TED2015)
Isabel Allende	Tales of passion (TED2007); How to live passionately—no matter your age (TED2014)
Uri Alon	Why truly innovative science demands a leap into the unknown (TEDGlobal 2013)
Marco Alverà	The surprising ingredient that makes businesses work better (TED2018)
Grimanesa Amoros	Following the Lights (TEDGlobal 2014)
Anas Aremeyaw Anas	How I named, shamed and jailed (TED2013)
Lemon Andersen	Please don't take my Air Jordans (TEDYouth 2011)
Chris Anderson	TED's nonprofit transition (TED2002); How web video powers global innovation (TEDGlobal 2010); Questions no one knows the answers to (TED-Ed 2012)
Chris Anderson	Technology's long tail (TED2004)
Ray Anderson	The business logic of sustainability (TED2009)
Jack Andraka	A promising test for pancreatic cancer ... from a teenager (TED2013)
Simon Anholt	Which country does the most good for the world? (TEDSalon Berlin 2014)
Michael Anti	Behind the great firewall of China (TEDGlobal 2012)
Paola Antonelli	Treat design as art (TED2007); Why I brought Pac-Man to MoMA (TEDSalon NY2013)
Kwame Anthony Appiah	Is religion good or bad? (This is a trick question) (TEDSalon NY2014)
Alejandro Aravena	My architectural philosophy? Bring the community into the process (TEDGlobal 2014)
Dan Ariely	Our buggy moral code (TED2009); Beware conflicts of interest (TED2011); How equal do we want the world to be? You'd be surprised (TED2015)
Karen Armstrong	My wish: The Charter for Compassion (TED2008) TED Prize; Let's revive the Golden Rule (TEDGlobal 2009)
Yann Arthus-Bertrand	A wide-angle view of fragile Earth (TED2009)
Kristen Ashburn	The face of AIDS in Africa (TED2003)
Julian Assange	Why the world needs WikiLeaks (TEDGlobal 2010)
Anthony Atala	Growing new organs (TEDMED 2009); Printing a human kidney (TED2011)
George Ayittey	Africa's cheetahs versus hippos (TEDGlobal 2007)

== B ==
Speaker	Talk(s)
Iwan Baan	Ingenious homes in unexpected places (TEDCity2.0 2013)
Julia Bacha	Pay attention to nonviolence (TEDGlobal 2011)
Uldus Bakhtiozina	Wry photos that turn stereotypes upside down (TED2014)
Kevin Bales	How to combat modern slavery (TED2010)
Robert Ballard	The astonishing hidden world of the deep ocean (TED2008)
Daniella Ballou-Aares	How business leaders can renew democracy (TED Democracy 2023)
James Balog	Time-lapse proof of extreme ice loss (TEDGlobal 2009)
Chris Bangle	Great cars are great art (TED2002)
Marian Bantjes	Intricate beauty by design (TED2010)
Massimo Banzi	How Arduino is open-sourcing imagination (TEDGlobal 2012)
Richard Baraniuk	The birth of the open-source learning revolution (TED2006)
Benjamin Barber	Why mayors should rule the world (TEDGlobal 2013)
Dan Barber	How I fell in love with a fish (TED2010)
Thomas P. M. Barnett	Let's rethink America's military strategy (TED2005)
Keith Barry	Brain magic (TED2004)
Jake Barton	The museum of you (TEDSalon NY2013)
Bonnie Bassler	How bacteria "talk" (TED2009)
Ayah Bdeir	Building blocks that blink, beep and teach (TED2012)
Beardyman	The polyphonic me (TED2013)
Kiran Bedi	A police chief with a difference (TEDWomen 2010)
Eli Beer	The fastest ambulance? A motorcycle (TEDMED 2013)
Yves Béhar	Designing objects that tell stories (TED2008); A supercharged motorcycle design (TED2009)
Isabel Behncke	Evolution's gift of play, from bonobo apes to humans (TED2011)
Maya Beiser	A cello with many voices (TED2011)
Joe Belfiore (as "Joole Ferbie")	The Game (TED2004)
Arthur T. Benjamin	A performance of "Mathemagic" (TED2005); Teach statistics before calculus! (TED2009); The magic of Fibonacci numbers (TEDGlobal 2013)
Katie Bender	Conquering uncertainty with tenacity (TED2017)
Yochai Benkler	The new open-source economics (TEDGlobal 2005)
Amanda Bennett	We need a heroic narrative for death (TEDMED 2013)
Janine Benyus	Biomimicry's surprising lessons from nature's engineers (TED2005); Biomimicry in action (TEDGlobal 2009)
Eric Berlow	Simplifying complexity (TEDGlobal 2010); Mapping ideas worth spreading (TED2013) talk with Sean Gourley
Seth Berkley	HIV and flu — the vaccine strategy (TED2010)
Tim Berners-Lee	The next web (TED2009); The year open data went worldwide (TED2010); A Magna Carta for the web (TED2014)
Alexander Betts	Our refugee system is failing. Here's how we can fix it (TED2016)
Jeff Bezos	The electricity metaphor for the web's future (TED2003)
Harsha Bhogle	The rise of cricket, the rise of India (TEDIndia 2009)
Sanford Biggers	An artist's unflinching look at racial violence (TED2016)
David Binder	The arts festival revolution (TEDGlobal 2012)
Andrew Bird	A one-man orchestra of the imagination (TED2010)
Tim Birkhead	The early birdwatchers (TED2010)
Mina Bissell	Experiments that point to a new understanding of cancer (TEDGlobal 2012)
Susan Blackmore	Memes and "temes" (TED2008)
David Blaine	How I held my breath for 17 minutes (TEDMED 2009)
Sarah-Jayne Blakemore	The mysterious workings of the adolescent brain (TEDGlobal 2012)
Paul Bloom	The origins of pleasure (TEDGlobal 2011); Can prejudice ever be a good thing? (TEDSalon NY2014)
Kwabena Boahen	A computer that works like the brain (TEDGlobal 2007)
David Bolinsky	Visualizing the wonder of a living cell (TED2007)
Bono	My wish: Three actions for Africa (TED2005) TED Prize; The good news on poverty (Yes, there's good news) (TED2013)
Phil Borges	Photos of endangered cultures (TED2006)
Lera Boroditsky	How language shapes the way we think (TED2018)
Shukla Bose	Teaching one child at a time (TEDIndia 2009)
Penelope Boston	There might just be life on Mars (TED2006)
Nick Bostrom	A philosophical quest for our biggest problems (TEDGlobal 2005); What happens when our computers get smarter than we are? (TED2015)
Tabetha Boyajian	The most mysterious star in the universe (TED2016)
Laurel Braitman	Depressed dogs, cats with OCD — what animal madness means for us humans (TEDSalon NY2014)
Stewart Brand	The Long Now (TED2004); What squatter cities can teach us (TED2006); 4 environmental 'heresies' (TED@State 2009); Debate: Does the world need nuclear energy? (TED2010); The dawn of de-extinction. Are you ready? (TED2013)
Richard Branson	Life at 30,000 feet (TED2007)
Cynthia Breazeal	The rise of personal robots (TEDWomen 2010)
Rory Bremner	A one-man world summit (TEDGlobal 2009)
Kevin Briggs	The bridge between suicide and life (TED2014)
Larry Brilliant	My wish: Help me stop pandemics (TED2006) TED Prize
Sergey Brin	The genesis of Google (TED2004); Why Google Glass? (TED2013)
Heather Brooke	My battle to expose government corruption (TEDGlobal 2012)
Arthur C. Brooks	A conservative's plea: Let's work together (TED2016)
David Brooks	The social animal (TED2011); Should you live for your résumé ... or your eulogy? (TED2014)
Rodney Brooks	Robots will invade our lives (TED2003); Why we will rely on robots (TED2013)
Brené Brown	Listening to shame (TED2012)
Gordon Brown	Wiring a web for global good (TEDGlobal 2009); Global ethic vs. national interest (TEDGlobal 2009)
Sunni Brown	Doodlers, unite! (TED2011)
Erik Brynjolfsson	The key to growth? Race with the machines (TED2013)
Leah Buechley	How to "sketch" with electronics (TEDYouth 2011)
Bruce Bueno de Mesquita	A prediction for the future of Iran (TED2009)
Amanda Burden	How public spaces make cities work (TED2014)
Chris Burkard	The joy of surfing in ice-cold water (TED2015)
Nadine Burke Harris	How childhood trauma affects health across a lifetime (TEDMED 2014)
Larry Burns	The future of cars (TED2005)
Stephen Burt	Why people need poetry (TEDGlobal 2013)
Edward Burtynsky	My wish: manufactured landscapes and green education (TED2005) TED Prize; Photographing the landscape of oil (TEDGlobal 2009)
David Byrne	"(Nothing But) Flowers" with string quartet (TED2010)

== C ==
Speaker	Talk(s)
Susan Cain	The power of introverts (TED2012)
David Cameron	The next age of government (TED2010)
James Cameron	Before Avatar ... a curious boy (TED2010)
Thomas P. Campbell	Weaving narratives in museum galleries (TED2012)
Geoffrey Canada	Our failing schools. Enough is enough! (TED Talks Education 2013)
Homaro Cantu	Cooking as alchemy (TED2011)
Rufus Cappadocia	Blindfold origami and cello (TED2008)
David Carson	Design and discovery (TED2003)
Jimmy Carter	Why I believe the mistreatment of women is the number one human rights abuse (TEDWomen 2015)
Majora Carter	Greening the ghetto (TED2006 and TED2022)
Matthew Carter	My life in typefaces (TED2014)
Jamais Cascio	Tools for a better world (TED2006)
Vint Cerf	The interspecies internet? An idea in progress (TED2013)
David Chalmers	How do you explain consciousness? (TED2014)
Leslie T. Chang	The voices of China's workers (TEDGlobal 2012)
Ruth Chang	How to make hard choices (TEDSalon NY2014)
Patrick Chappatte	The power of cartoons (TEDGlobal 2010)
Robin Chase	The idea behind Zipcar (and what comes next) (TED2007); Excuse me, may I rent your car? (TEDGlobal 2012)
Tom Chatfield	7 ways games reward the brain (TEDGlobal 2010)
Jane Chen	A warm embrace that saves lives (TEDIndia 2009)
Tracy Chevalier	Finding the story inside the painting (TEDSalon London Spring 2012)
Jan Chipchase	The anthropology of mobile phones (TED2007)
Nicholas A. Christakis	The hidden influence of social networks (TED2010); How social networks predict epidemics (TED@Cannes 2010)
David Christian	The history of our world in 18 minutes (TED2011)
George M. Church	Synthetic Life (TED2010); Synthetic Personal Genomes (TEDMED 2010)
Jok Church	A circle of caring (TED2007)
Bill Clinton	My wish: Rebuilding Rwanda (TED2007) TED Prize
Paul Collier	The "bottom billion" (TED2008); New rules for rebuilding a broken nation (TED@State 2009)
Billy Collins	Everyday moments, caught in time (TED2012); Two poems about what dogs think (probably) (TED2014)
Francis Collins	We need better drugs — now (TEDMED 2012)
Chip Conley	Measuring what makes life worthwhile (TED2010)
Mick Cornett	How an obese town lost a million pounds (TEDMED 2013)
Fabien Cousteau	What I learned from spending 31 days underwater (TEDGlobal 2014)
Steven Cowley	Fusion is energy's future (TEDGlobal 2009)
Brian Cox	CERN's supercollider (TED2008); What went wrong at the LHC (TED2009); Why we need the explorers (TEDSalon London 2010)
Lee Cronin	Making matter come alive (TEDGlobal 2011); Print your own medicine (TEDGlobal 2012)
Catherine Crump	The small and surprisingly dangerous detail the police track about you (TEDGlobal 2014)
Teddy Cruz	How architectural innovations migrate across borders (TEDGlobal 2013)
Mihaly Csikszentmihalyi	Flow, the secret to happiness (TED2004)
Amy Cuddy	Your body language shapes who you are (TEDGlobal 2012)
Drew Curtis	How I beat a patent troll (TED2012)
Matt Cutts	Try something new for 30 days (TED2011)

== D ==
Speaker	Talk(s)
Raffaello D'Andrea	The astounding athletic power of quadcopters (TEDGlobal 2013); Meet the dazzling flying machines of the future (TED2016)
Antonio Damasio	The quest to understand consciousness (TED2011)
Peter Daszak	What diseases come from animals? (TEDMED 2010)
Tal Danino	Programming bacteria to detect cancer (and maybe treat it) (TED2015)
Adam Davidson	What we learned from teetering on the fiscal cliff (TEDSalon NY2012)
Joshua Davis	Organic (TED2005)
Wade Davis	Dreams from endangered cultures (TED2003); The World Wide Web of belief and ritual (TED2008); Gorgeous photos of a backyard wilderness worth saving (TED2012)
Abha Dawesar	Life in the "digital now" (TEDGlobal 2013)
Richard Dawkins	Militant atheism (TED2002); Why the universe seems so strange (TEDGlobal 2005)
Alain de Botton	A kinder, gentler philosophy of success (TEDGlobal 2009); Atheism 2.0 (TEDGlobal 2011)
Aubrey de Grey	A roadmap to end aging (TEDGlobal 2005)
Danielle de Niese	A flirtatious aria (TEDGlobal 2011)
Joachim de Posada	Don't eat the marshmallow! (TED2009)
Anna Deavere Smith	Four American characters (TED2005)
Christopher deCharms	A look inside the brain in real time (TED2008)
Carmen Agra Deedy	Once upon a time, my mother ... (TED2005)
Laura Deming	How can science and business team up for the long (health) haul? (TEDMED2013)
Daniel Dennett	Dangerous memes (TED2002); The illusion of consciousness (TED2003); Let's teach religion — all religion — in schools (TED2006); Cute, sexy, sweet, funny (TED2009)
Felix Dennis	Odes to vice and consequences (TED2004)
Joe DeRisi	Solving medical mysteries (TED2006)
Joseph DeSimone	What if 3D printing was 100x faster? (TED2015)
Brian Dettmer	Old books reborn as art (TEDYouth 2014)
David Deutsch	Chemical scum that dream of distant quasars (TEDGlobal 2005); A new way to explain explanation (TEDGlobal 2009)
Peter Diamandis	Our next giant leap (TEDGlobal 2005); Stephen Hawking's zero g flight (TED2008); Abundance is our future (TED2012)
Jared Diamond	Why do societies collapse? (TED2003); How societies can grow old better (TED2013)
Niels Diffrient	Rethinking the way we sit down (TED2002)
John Doerr	Salvation (and profit) in greentech (TED2007)
Thomas Dolby	Cape Breton fiddling in reel time (TED2002) "What You've Got" (TED2003) "La Vie en Rose" (TED2004) "Love Is a Loaded Pistol" (TED2010) "(Nothing But) Flowers" with string quartet (TED2010)
Liza Donnelly	Drawing on humor for change (TEDWomen 2010)
Peter Donnelly	How juries are fooled by statistics (TEDGlobal 2005)
Dale Dougherty	We are makers (TED@MotorCity 2011)
Marcus du Sautoy	Symmetry, reality's riddle (TEDGlobal 2009)
R. Luke DuBois	Insightful human portraits made from data (TED2016)
Angela Duckworth	The key to success? Grit (TED Talks Education 2013)
Gustavo Dudamel	El Sistema's top youth orchestra (TED2009)
Esther Duflo	Social experiments to fight poverty (TED2010)
Regina E. Dugan	From mach-20 glider to hummingbird drone (TED2012)
Benjamin B. Dunlap	The lifelong learner (TED2007)
Denis Dutton	A Darwinian theory of beauty (TED2010)
Freeman Dyson	Let's look for life in the outer solar system (TED2003)
George Dyson	The story of Project Orion (TED2002); The birth of the computer (TED2003)

== E ==
Speaker	Talk(s)
David Eagleman	Can we create new senses for humans? (TED2015)
Sylvia Earle	My wish: protect our oceans (TED2009) TED Prize
Mick Ebeling	The invention that unlocked a locked-in artist (TEDActive 2011)
Roger Ebert	Remaking my voice (TED2011)
Kenichi Ebina	My magic moves (TED2007)
Janet Echelman	Taking imagination seriously (TED2011)
Dave Eggers	My wish: once upon a school (TED2008) TED Prize
Ron Eglash	The fractals at the heart of African designs (TEDGlobal 2007)
Einstein the Parrot	A talking, squawking parrot (TED2006)
Jonathan Eisen	Meet your microbes (TEDMED 2012)
Shereen El Feki	Pop culture in the Arab world (TEDGlobal 2009); A little-told tale of sex and sensuality (TEDGlobal 2013)
Rana el Kaliouby	This app knows how you feel — from the look on your face (TEDWomen 2015)
May El-Khalil	Making peace is a marathon (TEDGlobal 2013)
Hasan M. Elahi	FBI, here I am! (TEDGlobal 2011)
Keren Elazari	Hackers: the Internet's immune system (TED2014)
Olafur Eliasson	Playing with space and light (TED2009)
Christopher Emdin	Teach teachers how to create magic (TED@NYC 2013)
Juan Enríquez	The life code that will reshape the future (TED2003); Using biology to rethink the energy challenge (TEDSalon 2007 Hot Science); The next species of human (TED2009); Your online life, permanent as a tattoo (TED2013)
Eve Ensler	Happiness in body and soul (TED2004); What security means to me (TEDGlobal 2005); Embrace your inner girl (TEDIndia 2009); Suddenly, my body (TEDWomen 2010)
David Epstein	Are athletes really getting faster, better, stronger? (TED2014)
Nancy Etcoff	Happiness and its surprises (TED2004)
Ethel	A string quartet plays "Blue Room" (TED2006) "(Nothing But) Flowers" with string quartet (TED2010)
Hugh Evans	What does it mean to be a citizen of the world? (TED2016)
Paul W. Ewald	Can we domesticate germs? (TED2007)
Corneille Ewango	A hero of the Congo forest (TEDGlobal 2007)

== F ==
Speaker	Talk(s)
Tony Fadell	The first secret of design is ... noticing (TED2015)
James H. Fallon	Exploring the mind of a killer (TED2009)
Brian Farrell	Building a Facebook of biodiversity for the island of Hispaniola (TED2005)
Negin Farsad	A highly scientific taxonomy of haters (TED2016)
Bruce Feiler	The council of dads (TEDMED 2010); Agile programming — for your family (TEDSalon NY2013)
Noah Feldman	Politics and religion are technologies (TED2003)
Niall Ferguson	The 6 killer apps of prosperity (TEDGlobal 2011)
Bran Ferren	To create for the ages, let's combine art and engineering (TED2014); Reading & writing is a fad (TED-NY); There's no bits like show bits (TED2)
America Ferrera	My identity is a superpower - not an obstacle (TED2019)
Harvey V. Fineberg	Are we ready for neo-evolution? (TED2011)
Ron Finley	A guerilla gardener in South Central LA (TED2013)
Stuart Firestein	The pursuit of ignorance (TED2013)
Robert Fischell	My wish: three unusual medical inventions (TED2005) TED Prize
Helen Fisher	Why we love, why we cheat (TED2006); The brain in love (TED2008)
Gary William Flake	Is Pivot a turning point for web exploration (TED2010)
Charles Fleischer	All things are Moleeds (TED2005)
James Flynn	Why our IQ levels are higher than our grandparents' (TED2013)
Joshua Foer	Feats of memory anyone can do (TED2012)
William Clay Ford Jr.	A future beyond traffic gridlock (TED2011)
Vicky Forster	What can cancer survivors teach us about cancer treatment? (TED2017)
Russell Foster	Why do we sleep? (TEDGlobal 2013)
Cary Fowler	One seed at a time, protecting the future of food (TEDGlobal 2009)
John Francis	Walk the earth ... my 17-year vow of silence (TED2008)
Ze Frank	Nerdcore comedy (TED2004); My web playroom (TEDGlobal 2010); Are you human? (TED2014)
LaToya Ruby Frazier	A visual history of inequality in industrial America (TED2015)
Chrystia Freeland	The rise of the new global super-rich (TEDGlobal 2013)
Louise Fresco	We need to feed the whole world (TED2009)
Stephen Friend	The hunt for "unexpected genetic heroes" (TED2014)

== G ==
Speaker	Talk(s)
Eleni Zaude Gabre-Madhin	A commodities exchange for Ethiopia (TEDGlobal 2007)
Peter Gabriel	Fight injustice with raw video (TED2006); The interspecies internet? An idea in progress (TED2013)
Greg Gage	The cockroach beatbox (TEDYouth 2011); Backyard brains: the neurorevolution (TED2012); The RoboRoach (TEDGlobal 2013); How to control someone else's arm with your brain (TED2015); Electrical experiments with plants that count and communicate (TED2017); DIY neuroscience (TED Series 2018)
Cindy Gallop	Make love, not porn (TED2009)
Jessa Gamble	Our natural sleep cycle (TEDGlobal 2010)
Lisa Gansky	The future of business is the "mesh" (TED@MotorCity 2011)
Arthur Ganson	Moving sculpture (TED2002)
Laurie Garrett	Lessons from the 1918 flu (TED2007)
Tomer Garzberg	What happens when we take humans out of work? (TED2017)
Bill Gates	Mosquitos, malaria and education (TED2009); Innovating to zero! (TED2010); How state budgets are breaking US schools (TED2011); Teachers need real feedback (TED Talks Education 2013); Why giving away our wealth has been the most satisfying thing we've done (TED2014); The next outbreak? We’re not ready (TED2015)
Melinda Gates	Why giving away our wealth has been the most satisfying thing we've done (TED2014)
Theaster Gates	How to revive a neighborhood: with imagination, beauty and art (TED2015)
Atul Gawande	How do we heal medicine? (TED2012)
Roxane Gay	Confessions of a bad feminist (TEDWomen 2015)
Leymah Gbowee	Unlock the intelligence, passion, greatness of girls (TED2012)
James Geary	Metaphorically speaking (TEDGlobal 2009)
Joe Gebbia	How Airbnb designs for trust (TED2016)
Ueli Gegenschatz	Extreme wingsuit flying (TED2009)
Frank Gehry	My days as a young rebel (TED1990); A master architect asks, Now what? (TED2002)
Murray Gell-Mann	Beauty, truth and ... physics? (TED2007); The ancestor of language (TED2007)
Rose George	Let's talk crap. Seriously. (TED2013); Inside the secret shipping industry (TED@BCG Singapore 2013)
Neil Gershenfeld	Unleash your creativity in a Fab Lab (TED2006); The interspecies internet? An idea in progress (TED2013)
Mohammad Ashraf Ghani	How to rebuild a broken state (TEDGlobal 2005)
Pankaj Ghemawat	Actually, the world isn't flat (TEDGlobal 2012)
Andrea M. Ghez	The hunt for a supermassive black hole (TEDGlobal 2009)
Wael Ghonim	Inside the Egyptian revolution (TED2011)
Gabby Giffords	Be passionate. Be courageous. Be your best. (TED2014)
Daniel Gilbert	The surprising science of happiness (TED2004); Why we make bad decisions (TEDGlobal 2005); The psychology of your future self (TED2014)
Elizabeth Gilbert	Your elusive creative genius (TED2009); Success, failure and the drive to keep creating (TED2014)
Paul Gilding	The Earth is full (TED2012)
Anand Giridharadas	A tale of two Americas. And the mini-mart where they collided (TED2015)
Malcolm Gladwell	Choice, happiness and spaghetti sauce (TED2004); The strange tale of the Norden bombsight (TEDGlobal 2011); The unheard story of David and Goliath (TEDSalon NY2013)
Milton Glaser	Using design to make ideas new (TED1998)
Evelyn Glennie	How to truly listen (TED2003)
Misha Glenny	How global crime networks work (TEDGlobal 2009); Hire the hackers! (TEDGlobal 2011)
Seth Godin	How to get your ideas to spread (TED2003); The tribes we lead (TED2009)
Alice Goffman	How we're priming some kids for college — and others for prison (TED2015)
Ben Goldacre	Battling bad science (TEDGlobal 2011); What doctors don't know about the drugs they prescribe (TEDMED 2012)
Thelma Golden	How art gives shape to cultural change (TED2009)
Ian Goldin	Navigating our global future (TEDGlobal 2009)
Daniel Goldstein	The battle between your present and future self (TEDSalon NY2011)
Rebecca Goldstein	The long reach of reason (TED2012)
Daniel Goleman	Why aren't we more compassionate? (TED2007)
Charmian Gooch	Meet global corruption's hidden players (TEDGlobal 2013); My wish: To launch a new era of openness in business (TED2014) TED Prize
Jane Goodall	What separates us from chimpanzees? (TED2002); How humans and animals can live together (TEDGlobal 2007)
Doris Kearns Goodwin	Lessons from past presidents (TED2008)
Alison Gopnik	What do babies think? (TEDGlobal 2011)
Deborah M. Gordon	The emergent genius of ant colonies (TED2003); What ants teach us about the brain, cancer and the Internet (TED2014)
Robert J. Gordon	The death of innovation, the end of growth (TED2013)
Al Gore	Averting the climate crisis (TED2006); New thinking on the climate crisis (TED2008); What comes after An Inconvenient Truth? (TED2009)
Antony Gormley	Sculpted space, within and without (TEDGlobal 2012)
Jon Gosier	The problem with "trickle-down techonomics" (TEDGlobal 2014)
Billy Graham	On technology and faith (TED1998)
Temple Grandin	The world needs all kinds of minds (TED2010)
Jennifer Granholm	A clean energy proposal — race to the top! (TED2013)
Lennart Green	Close-up card magic with a twist (TED2005)
Brian Greene	Making sense of string theory (TED2005); Is our universe the only universe? (TED2012)
Glenn Greenwald	Why privacy matters (TEDGlobal 2014)
Saul Griffith	Everyday inventions (TED2006); High-altitude wind energy from kites! (TED2009)
Bill Gross	A solar energy system that tracks the sun (TED2003); The single biggest reason why startups succeed (TED2015)

== H ==
Speaker	Talk(s)
Chris Hadfield	What I learned from going blind in space (TED2014)
Jonathan Haidt	The moral roots of liberals and conservatives (TED2008); Religion, evolution, and the ecstasy of self-transcendence (TED2012); How common threats can make common (political) ground (TEDSalon NY2012)
Joan Halifax	Compassion and the true meaning of empathy (TEDWomen 2010)
Suheir Hammad	Poems of war, peace, women, power (TEDWomen 2010)
Robert Hammond	Building a park in the sky (TED2011)
Jefferson Han	The radical promise of the multi-touch interface (TED2006)
Nick Hanauer	Who are the job creators? (TED2012); Beware, fellow plutocrats, the pitchforks are coming (TEDSalon NY2014)
Herbie Hancock	An all-star set (TED2009)
Handspring Puppet Company	The genius puppetry behind War Horse (TED2011)
James Hansen	Why I must speak out about climate change (TED2012)
Phil Hansen	Embrace the shake (TED2013)
Michael Hansmeyer	Building unimaginable shapes (TEDGlobal 2012)
David Hanson	Robots that "show emotion" (TED2009)
Yuval Harari	What explains the rise of humans? (TEDGlobalLondon 2015)
Neil Harbisson	I listen to color (TEDGlobal 2012)
John Hardy	My green school dream (TEDGlobal 2010)
Tim Harford	Trial, error and the God complex (TEDGlobal 2011)
Honor Harger	A history of the universe in sound (TEDSalon London Spring 2011)
Johann Hari	Everything you think you know about addiction is wrong (TEDGlobalLondon 2015)
Jonathan Harris	The Web's secret stories (TED2007); The web as art (TED2007)
Sam Harris	Science can answer moral questions (TED2010)
Stefon Harris	There are no mistakes on the bandstand (TEDSalon NY2011)
Del Harvey	Protecting Twitter users (sometimes from themselves) (TED2014)
Gary Haugen	The hidden reason for poverty the world needs to address now (TED2015)
Graham Hawkes	A flight through the ocean (TED2005)
Stephen Hawking	Questioning the universe (TED2008)
Jeff Hawkins	How brain science will change computing (TED2003)
Cheryl Hayashi	The magnificence of spider silk (TED2010)
Tyrone Hayes	The toxic baby (TEDWomen 2010)
Lesley Hazleton	The doubt essential to faith (TEDGlobal 2013)
Charles Hazlewood	Trusting the ensemble (TEDGlobal 2011)
Imogen Heap	"Wait It Out" (TEDGlobal 2009)
Thomas Heatherwick	Building the Seed Cathedral (TED2011)
Margaret Heffernan	Dare to disagree (TEDGlobal 2012); Why it's time to forget the pecking order at work (TEDWomen 2015)
Jeremy Heimans	What new power looks like (TEDSalon Berlin 2014)
Shea Hembrey	How I became 100 artists (TED2011)
Hugh Herr	The new bionics that let us run, climb and dance (TED2014)
Erik Hersman	Reporting crisis via texting (TED2009)
Noreena Hertz	How to use experts — and when not to (TEDSalon London 2010)
Denise Herzing	Could we speak the language of dolphins? (TED2013)
James Heywood	The big idea my brother inspired (TEDMED 2009)
Danny Hillis	Back to the future (of 1994) (TED1994); Understanding cancer through proteomics (TEDMED 2010); The Internet could crash. We need a Plan B (TED2013)
Maya Higa	The Wildlife Sanctuary You Can Visit from Anywhere (TED2026)
Andy Hobsbawm	Do the green thing (TED2008)
Mellody Hobson	Color blind or color brave? (TED2014)
John Hockenberry	The painter and the pendulum (TED in the Field 2009); We are all designers (TED2012)
John Hodgman	Aliens, love — where are they? (TED2008); Design, explained. (TED2012)
Elizabeth Holmes	Lab testing reinvented (TEDMED2014)
David Holt	The joyful tradition of mountain music (TED2004)
Jim Holt	Why does the universe exist? (TED2014)
Carl Honoré	In praise of slowness (TEDGlobal 2005)
Rob Hopkins	Transition to a world without oil (TEDGlobal 2009)
Jack Horner	Building a dinosaur from a chicken (TED2011)
Philip K. Howard	Four ways to fix a broken legal system (TED2010)
Freeman A. Hrabowski III	4 pillars of college success in science (TED2013)
ShaoLan Hsueh	Learn to read Chinese ... with ease! (TED2013)
Sirena Huang	An 11-year-old's magical violin (TED2006)
Yasheng Huang	Does democracy stifle economic growth? (TEDGlobal 2011)
Arianna Huffington	How to succeed? Get more sleep (TEDWomen 2010)
Sophie Hunger	Songs of secrets and city lights (TEDGlobal 2009)
Sam Hyde	2070 Paradigm Shift (TEDxDrexel 2013)
Mikko Hyppönen	Fighting viruses, defending the net (TEDGlobal 2011)

== I ==
Speaker	Talk(s)
Nizar Ibrahim	How we unearthed the Spinosaurus (TEDYouth 2014)
Robin Ince	Science versus wonder? (TEDGlobal 2011)
Bjarke Ingels	3 warp-speed architecture tales (TEDGlobal 2009)
Dave Isay	Everyone around you has a story the world needs to hear (TED2015) TED Prize
Garik Israelian	How spectroscopy could reveal alien life (TEDGlobal 2009)
Joi Ito	Want to innovate? Become a "now-ist" (TED2014)
Janet Iwasa	How animations can help scientists test a hypothesis (TED2014)
Sheena Iyengar	The art of choosing (TEDGlobal 2010); How to make choosing easier (TEDSalon NY2011)
Pico Iyer	Where is home? (TEDGlobal 2013); The art of stillness (TEDSalon NY2014)

== J ==
Speaker	Talk(s)
Nina Jablonski	Skin color is an illusion (TED2009)
Jessica Jackley	Poverty, money — and love (TEDGlobal 2010)
Alison Jackson	An unusual glimpse at celebrity (TEDGlobal 2005)
Tim Jackson	An economic reality check (TEDGlobal 2010)
A.J. Jacobs	How healthy living nearly killed me (TEDMED 2011); The world's largest family reunion … we're all invited! (TEDActive 2014)
Mark Z. Jacobson	Debate: Does the world need nuclear energy? (TED2010)
Martin Jacques	Understanding the rise of China (TEDSalon London 2010)
Moriba Jah	AstriaGraph: world’s first crowdsourced Space Traffic Monitoring system (TED2019)
Emmanuel Jal	The music of a war child (TEDGlobal 2009)
Theo Jansen	My creations, a new form of life (TED2007)
Mae Jemison	Teach arts and sciences together (TED2002)
Mary Lou Jepsen	Could future devices read images from our brains? (TED2013)
Mitchell Joachim	Don't build your home, grow it! (TED2010)
Maz Jobrani	Did you hear the one about the Iranian-American? (TEDGlobal 2010)
Erik Johansson	Impossible photography (TEDSalon London Fall 2011)
Steven Johnson	The Web as a city (TED2003); How the "ghost map" helped end a killer disease (TEDSalon 2006); Where good ideas come from (TEDGlobal 2010)
Bill T. Jones	The dancer, the singer, the cellist ... and a moment of creative magic (TED2015)
Paul Tudor Jones	Why we need to rethink capitalism (TED2015)
Sarah Jones	A one-woman global village (TED2009); What does the future hold? 11 characters offer quirky answers (TED2014); One woman, five characters, and a sex lesson from the future (TED2015)
Chris Jordan	Turning powerful stats into art (TED2008)
Ellen Jorgensen	Biohacking—you can do it, too (TED2013) What you need to know about CRISPR (TED2016)
Bill Joy	What I'm worried about, what I'm excited about (TED2006)
JR	My wish: Use art to turn the world inside out (TED2011) TED Prize; One year of turning the world inside out (TED2012)
Olivia Judson	Sex Advice to All Creation (TED2005)
Sebastian Junger	Why veterans miss war (TEDSalon NY2014)
Steve Jurvetson	Model rocketry (TED2007)

== K ==
Speaker	Talk(s)
Nathaniel Kahn	Scenes from "My Architect" (TED2002)
Daniel Kahneman	The riddle of experience vs. memory (TED2010)
Maira Kalman	The illustrated woman (TED2007)
Dean Kamen	To invent is to give (TED2002); Luke, a new prosthetic arm for soldiers (TED2007); The emotion behind invention (TEDMED 2009)
William Kamkwamba	How I built a windmill (TEDGlobal 2007); How I harnessed the wind (TEDGlobal 2009)
Kenneth Kamler	Medical miracle on Everest (TEDMED 2009)
Nancy Kanwisher	A neural portrait of the human mind (TED2014)
Zach Kaplan	Toys and materials from the future (TED2005)
Shekhar Kapur	We are the stories we tell ourselves (TEDIndia 2009)
The Karmapa	The technology of the heart (TEDIndia 2009)
Ben Katchor	Comics of bygone New York (TED2002)
Alan Kay	A powerful idea about ideas (TED2007)
Sarah Kay	If I should have a daughter ... (TED2011)
David Keith	A critical look at geoengineering against climate change (TEDSalon 2007 Hot Science)
David M. Kelley	Human-centered design (TED2002); How to build your creative confidence (TED2012)
Kevin Kelly	How technology evolves (TED2005)
Mark Kelly	Be passionate. Be courageous. Be your best. (TED2014)
Cynthia Kenyon	Experiments that hint of longer lives (TEDGlobal 2011)
Diébédo Francis Kéré	How to build with clay... and community (TEDCity2.0 2013)
Salman Khan	Let's use video to reinvent education (TED2011)
Shah Rukh Khan	Thoughts on humanity, fame and love (TED2017)
Wadah Khanfar	A historic moment in the Arab world (TED2011)
Parag Khanna	Mapping the future of countries (TEDGlobal 2009)
Chip Kidd	Designing books is no laughing matter. OK, it is. (TED2012); The art of first impressions — in design and life (TEDSalon NY2015)
Beeban Kidron	The shared wonder of film (TEDSalon London Spring 2012)
Suki Kim	This is what it's like to teach in North Korea (TED2015)
Kaki King	Playing "Pink Noise" on guitar (TED2008)
Daniel Kish	How I use sonar to navigate the world (TED2015)
Jonathan Klein	Photos that changed the world (TED2010)
Joshua Klein	A thought experiment on the intelligence of crows (TED2008)
Naomi Klein	Addicted to risk (TEDWomen 2010)
Megan Klimen	What if computers could map tissue the way they sequence genes? (TEDMED 2016)
Chris Kluwe	How augmented reality will change sports ... and build empathy (TED2014)
Hubertus Knabe	The dark secrets of a surveillance state (TEDSalon Berlin 2014)
Rob Knight	How our microbes make us who we are (TED2014)
Aaron Koblin	Visualizing ourselves ... with crowd-sourced data (TED2011)
Sally Kohn	Let's try emotional correctness (TED@NYC 2013); Don't like clickbait? Don't click (TED@NYC 2014)
Katlego Kai Kolanyane-Kesupile	How I'm bringing queer pride to my rural village (TEDGlobal2017)
Daphne Koller	What we're learning from online education (TEDGlobal 2012)
Marc Koska	1.3m reasons to re-invent the syringe (TEDGlobal 2009)
Gary Kovacs	Tracking our online trackers (TED2012)
Shane Koyczan	To This Day ... for the bullied and beautiful (TED2013)
Ivan Krastev	Can democracy exist without trust? (TEDGlobal 2012)
Bernie Krause	The voice of the natural world (TEDGlobal 2013)
Sunitha Krishnan	The fight against sex slavery (TEDIndia 2009)
Jarrett J. Krosoczka	Why lunch ladies are heroes (TED@NYC 2014)
JoAnn Kuchera-Morin	Stunning data visualization in the AlloSphere (TED2009)
Vijay Kumar	Robots that fly ... and cooperate (TED2012)
James Howard Kunstler	The ghastly tragedy of the suburbs (TED2004)
Pamelia Kurstin	The untouchable music of the theremin (TED2002)
Ray Kurzweil	The accelerating power of technology (TED2005); A university for the coming singularity (TED2009); Get ready for hybrid thinking (TED2014)
Marc Kushner	Why the buildings of the future will be shaped by ... you (TED2014)
David Kwong	Two nerdy obsessions meet — and it's magic (TED2014)

== L ==
Speaker	Talk(s)
Yang Lan	The generation that's remaking China (TEDGlobal 2011)
Dawn Landes	A song for my hero, the woman who rowed into a hurricane (TED2015)
Joe Landolina	This gel can make you stop bleeding instantly (TEDGlobal 2014)
David Lang	My underwater robot (TED2013)
Robert Lang	The math and magic of origami (TED2008)
Frans Lanting	The story of life in photographs (TED2005); Photos that give voice to the animal kingdom (TED2014)
Brenda Laurel	Games for girls (TED1998)
Caroline Lavelle	Casting a spell on the cello (TED2005)
Tan Le	A headset that reads your brainwaves (TEDGlobal 2010)
Charles Leadbeater	The era of open innovation (TEDGlobal 2005); Education innovation in the slums (TEDSalon London 2010)
Louise Leakey	A dig for humanity's origins (TED2008)
Richard Ledgett	The NSA responds to Edward Snowden's TED Talk (TED2014)
Hyeonseo Lee	My escape from North Korea (TED2013)
Jae Rhim Lee	My mushroom burial suit (TEDGlobal 2011)
Johnny Lee	Free or cheap Wii Remote hacks (TED2008)
Suzanne Lee	Grow your own clothes (TED2011)
Rob Legato	The art of creating awe (TEDGlobal 2012)
Joseph Lekuton	A parable for Kenya (TEDGlobal 2007)
Joel S. Levine	Why we need to go back to Mars (TED2009)
Jon Levy	What makes us influential? (TEDSalon NY2018)
Gayle Tzemach Lemmon	Meet the women fighting on the front lines of an American war (TEDWomen 2015)
Annie Lennox	Why I am an HIV/AIDS activist (TEDGlobal 2010)
Jaime Lerner	A song of the city (TED2007)
Elizabeth Lesser	Take "the Other" to lunch (TEDWomen 2010)
Lawrence Lessig	Laws that choke creativity (TED2007); We the People, and the Republic we must reclaim (TED2013); The unstoppable walk to political reform (TED2014)
Golan Levin	Software (as) art (TED2004); Art that looks back at you (TED2009)
Janna Levin	The sound the universe makes (TED2011)
Emily Levine	A theory of everything (TED2002)
Steven Levitt	The freakonomics of crack dealing (TED2004); Surprising stats about child carseats (TEDGlobal 2005)
Monica Lewinsky	The price of shame (TED2015)
Eric Lewis	Piano jazz that rocks (TED2009); Chaos and harmony on piano (TED2009)
Sarah Lewis	Embrace the near win (TED2014)
Fei-Fei Li	How we're teaching computers to understand pictures (TED2015)
Daniel Libeskind	17 words of architectural inspiration (TED2009)
Manuel Lima	A Visual History of Human Knowledge (TED2015)
Charles Limb	Your brain on improv (TED2010); Building the musical muscle (TED2011)
Henry Lin	What we can learn from galaxies far, far away (TEDYouth 2013)
Jennifer Lin	Improvising on piano, aged 14 (TED2004)
Elizabeth Lindsey	Curating humanity's heritage (TEDWomen 2010)
Hod Lipson	Building "self-aware" robots (TED2007)
Garrett Lisi	An 8-dimensional model of the universe (TED2008)
Liu Bolin	The invisible man (TED2013)
Eric Liu	Why ordinary people need to understand power (TEDCity2.0 2013)
John Lloyd	An inventory of the invisible (TEDGlobal 2009); An animated tour of the invisible (TED-Ed 2012)
Elizabeth Loftus	The fiction of memory (TEDGlobal 2013)
Bjørn Lomborg	Global priorities bigger than climate change (TED2005)
Ross Lovegrove	Organic design, inspired by nature (TED2005)
Amory Lovins	Winning the oil endgame (TED2005); A 40-year plan for energy (TEDSalon NY2012)
Nancy Lublin	Texting that saves lives (TED2012)
The LXD	In the Internet age, dance evolves ... (TED2010)
Greg Lynn	Organic algorithms in architecture (TED2005)

== M ==
Speaker	Talk(s)
Ellen MacArthur	The surprising thing I learned sailing solo around the world (TED2015)
David Macaulay	An illustrated journey through Rome (TED2002)
Paul MacCready	Nature vs. humans (TED1998); A flight on solar wings (TED2003)
Neil MacGregor	2600 years of history in one object (TEDGlobal 2011)
Tod Machover	Inventing instruments that unlock new music (TED2008)
Rebecca MacKinnon	Let's take back the Internet! (TEDGlobal 2011)
Natalie MacMaster	Cape Breton fiddling in reel time (TED2002); Fiddling in reel time (TED2003)
Anne A. Madden	Meet the microscopic life in your home—and on your face (TED2017)
Joe Madiath	Better toilets, better life (TEDGlobal 2014)
John Maeda	Designing for simplicity (TED2007); How art, technology and design inform creative leaders (TEDGlobal 2012)
Pattie Maes	Meet the SixthSense interaction (TED2009)
Vusi Mahlasela	"Thula Mama" (TEDGlobal 2007) "Woza" (TEDGlobal 2007)
Pia Mancini	How to upgrade democracy for the Internet era (TEDGlobal 2014)
Benoit Mandelbrot	Fractals and the art of roughness (TED2010)
Bob Mankoff	Anatomy of a New Yorker cartoon (TEDSalon NY2013)
Harish Manwani	Profit's not always the point (TED@BCG Singapore 2013)
Henry Markram	A brain in a supercomputer (TEDGlobal 2009)
Roman Mars	Why city flags may be the worst-designed thing you've never noticed (TED2015)
Will Marshall	Tiny satellites show us the Earth as it changes in near-real-time (TED2014)
Courtney E. Martin	This isn't her mother's feminism (TEDWomen 2010)
R.A. Mashelkar	Breakthrough designs for ultra-low-cost products (TEDIndia 2009)
Christopher E. Mason	Discovering and designing genomes for Earth, Mars, and beyond (TEDMED 2015)
Mike Matas	A next-generation digital book (TED2011)
Shaffi Mather	A new way to fight corruption (TEDIndia 2009)
Rob May	Your Human Firewall – The Answer to the Cyber Security Problem (TEDxWoking 2017)
Thom Mayne	How architecture can connect us (TED2005)
Mariana Mazzucato	Government — investor, risk-taker, innovator (TEDGlobal 2013)
Andrew McAfee	What will future jobs look like? (TED2013)
David McCandless	The beauty of data visualization (TEDGlobal 2010)
Stanley McChrystal	Listen, learn ... then lead (TED2011); The military case for sharing knowledge (TED2014)
Scott McCloud	The visual magic of comics (TED2005)
William McDonough	Cradle to cradle design (TED2005)
Jane McGonigal	Gaming can make a better world (TED2010); The game that can give you 10 extra years of life (TEDGlobal 2012); Massively multi-player… thumb-wrestling? (TEDGlobal 2013)
Kelly McGonigal	How to make stress your friend (TEDGlobal 2013)
Wayne McGregor	A choreographer's creative process in real time (TEDGlobal 2012)
Nellie McKay	"Clonie" (TED2008) "Mother of Pearl," "If I Had You" (TED2008) "The Dog Song" (TED2008)
Erin McKean	The joy of lexicography (TED2007); Go ahead, make up new words! (TEDYouth 2014)
John McWhorter	Txtng is killing language. JK!!! (TED2013)
Alexa Meade	Your body is my canvas (TEDGlobal 2013)
Kamal Meattle	How to grow fresh air (TED2009)
Christien Meindertsma	How pig parts make the world turn (TEDGlobal 2010)
Natalie Merchant	Singing old poems to life (TED2010)
Michael Merzenich	Growing evidence of brain plasticity (TED2004)
Miriah Meyer	Science visualization (TED2013)
Bethany C. Meyers	Body neutrality (TEDx BethuneStreetWomen 2018)
Raul Midón	"Tembererana" (TED2007) "Peace on Earth" (TED2007)
Gero Miesenboeck	Re-engineering the brain (TEDGlobal 2010)
Anne Milgram	Why smart statistics are the key to fighting crime (TED@BCG San Francisco 2013)
Chris Milk	How virtual reality can create the ultimate empathy machine (TED2015)
Vivienne Ming	Making a better person (TEDMED2015)
Marvin Minsky	Health and the human mind (TED2003)
Anupam Mishra	The ancient ingenuity of water harvesting (TEDIndia 2009)
Pranav Mistry	Meet the SixthSense interaction (TED2009); The thrilling potential of SixthSense technology (TEDIndia 2009)
Pat Mitchell	So we leaned in ... now what? (TEDWomen 2013)
Sugata Mitra	The child-driven education (TEDGlobal 2010); Build a School in the Cloud (TED2013) TED Prize
Isaac Mizrahi	Fashion and creativity (TED2008)
Kees Moeliker	How a dead duck changed my life (TED2013)
Paul Moller	My dream of a flying car (TED2004)
Peter Molyneux	Meet Milo, the virtual boy (TEDGlobal 2010)
George Monbiot	For more wonder, rewild the world (TEDGlobal 2013)
Read Montague	What we're learning from 5,000 brains (TEDGlobal 2012)
Jon Mooallem	How the teddy bear taught us compassion (TED2014)
Charles Moore	Seas of plastic (TED2009)
Wes Moore	How to talk to veterans about the war (TEDSalon NY2014)
Elaine Morgan	I believe we evolved from aquatic apes (TEDGlobal 2009)
Evgeny Morozov	How the Net aids dictatorships (TEDGlobal 2009)
Holly Morris	Why stay in Chernobyl? Because it's home (TEDGlobal 2013)
Michael Moschen	Juggling as art ... and science (TED2002)
Dambisa Moyo	Is China the new idol for emerging economies? (TEDGlobal 2013)
Patience Mthunzi-Kufa	Could we cure HIV with lasers? (TED2015)
Geoff Mulgan	Post-crash, investing in a better world (TEDGlobal 2009); A short intro to the Studio School (TEDGlobal 2011)
Sendhil Mullainathan	Solving social problems with a nudge (TEDIndia 2009)
Aimee Mullins	Changing my legs - and my mindset (TED1998); My 12 pairs of legs (TED2009); The opportunity of adversity (TEDMED 2009)
Kary Mullis	Play! Experiment! Discover! (TED2002); A next-gen cure for killer infections (TED2009)
Vik Muniz	Art with wire, sugar, chocolate and string (TED2003)
Randall Munroe	Comics that ask "what if?" (TED2014)
Alaa Murabit	What my religion really says about women (TEDWomen 2015)
Elizabeth Murchison	Fighting a contagious cancer (TEDGlobal 2011)
Arunachalam Muruganantham	How I started a sanitary napkin revolution! (TED@Bangalore 2012)
Elon Musk	The mind behind Tesla, SpaceX, SolarCity ... (TED2013)
Kasiva Mutua	How I use the drum to tell my story (TEDGlobal 2017)
Boniface Mwangi	The day I stood up alone (TEDGlobal 2014)
Andrew Mwenda	Aid for Africa? No thanks. (TEDGlobal 2007)
Nathan Myhrvold	Archeology, animal photography, BBQ ... (TED2007); Could this laser zap malaria? (TED2010); Cooking as never seen before (TED2011)

== N ==
Speaker	Talk(s)
James Nachtwey	My wish: Let my photographs bear witness (TED2007) TED Prize; Moving photos of extreme drug-resistant TB (TED Prize Wish 2008)
Ethan Nadelmann	Why we need to end the War on Drugs (TEDGlobal 2014)
Nalini Nadkarni	Conserving the canopy (TED2009); Life science in prison (TED2010)
Radhika Nagpal	Harnessing the intelligence of the collective (TED2017)
Euvin Naidoo	Why invest in Africa (TEDGlobal 2007)
Loretta Napoleoni	The intricate economics of terrorism (TEDGlobal 2009)
Parikipandla Narahari	Betiya (TED2019)
Ajit Narayanan	A word game to communicate in any language (TED2013)
Naturally 7	A full-band beatbox (TED2009)
Maajid Nawaz	A global culture to fight extremism (TEDGlobal 2011)
Jimmy Nelson	Gorgeous portraits of the world's vanishing people (TEDGlobal 2014)
Nicholas Negroponte	5 predictions, from 1984 (TED1984); One Laptop per Child (TED2006); Taking OLPC to Colombia (TED in the Field 2008); A 30-year history of the future (TED2014)
Shirin Neshat	Art in exile (TEDWomen 2010)
Robert Neuwirth	The hidden world of shadow cities (TEDGlobal 2005); The power of the informal economy (TEDGlobal 2012)
Thandie Newton	Embracing otherness, embracing myself (TEDGlobal 2011)
Chimamanda Ngozi Adichie	The danger of a single story (TEDGlobal 2009)
Paul Nicklen	Tales of ice-bound wonderlands (TED2011)
Miguel Nicolelis	A monkey that controls a robot with its thoughts. No, really. (TEDMED 2012); Brain-to-brain communication has arrived. How we did it (TEDGlobal 2014)
Nandan Nilekani	Ideas for India's future (TED2009)
Sheila Nirenberg	A prosthetic eye to treat blindness (TEDMED 2011)
Don Norman	3 ways good design makes you happy (TED2003)
Peter Norvig	The 100,000-student classroom (TED2012)
Jehane Noujaim	My wish: A global day of film (TED2006) TED Prize
Beth Noveck	Demand a more open-source government (TEDGlobal 2012)
Jacqueline Novogratz	Invest in Africa's own solutions (TEDGlobal 2005); Patient capitalism (TEDGlobal 2007); An escape from poverty (TED2009); A third way to think about aid (TED@State 2009); Inspiring a life of immersion (TEDWomen 2010)
Sherwin Nuland	How electroshock therapy changed me (TED2001); The extraordinary power of ordinary people (TED2003)
Diana Nyad	Extreme swimming with the world's most dangerous jellyfish (TEDMED 2011); Never, ever give up (TEDWomen 2013)
Joseph Nye	Global power shifts (TEDGlobal 2010)

== O ==
Speaker	Talk(s)
Sharmeen Obaid-Chinoy	Inside a school for suicide bombers (TED2010)
Eddie Obeng	Smart failure for a fast-changing world (TEDGlobal 2012)
Fabian Oefner	Psychedelic science (TEDGlobal 2013)
Alexis Ohanian	How to make a splash in social media (TEDIndia 2009)
Ory Okolloh	How I became an activist (TEDGlobal 2007)
Ngozi Okonjo-Iweala	Want to help Africa? Do business here (TED2007); Aid versus trade (TEDGlobal 2007)
Jamie Oliver	Teach every child about food (TED2010) TED Prize
Rebecca Onie	What if our healthcare system kept us healthy? (TEDMED 2012)
Naomi Oreskes	Why we should trust scientists (TEDSalon NY2014)
Kate Orff	Reviving New York's rivers — with oysters! (TEDWomen 2010)
Dean Ornish	Healing through diet (TED2004); The killer American diet that's sweeping the planet (TED2006); Your genes are not your fate (TED2008)
Emily Oster	Flip your thinking on AIDS in Africa (TED2007)
Adam Ostrow	After your final status update (TEDGlobal 2011)
Seyi Oyesola	A hospital tour in Nigeria (TEDGlobal 2007)

== P ==
Phu

Speaker	Talk(s)
Svante Pääbo	DNA clues to our inner neanderthal (TEDGlobal 2011)
Eduardo Paes	The 4 commandments of cities (TED2012)
Larry Page	The genesis of Google (TED2004); Where's Google going next? (TED2014)
Mark Pagel	How language transformed humanity (TEDGlobal 2011)
Jennifer Pahlka	Coding a better government (TED2012)
Burçin Mutlu-Pakdil	The rare galaxy that is challenging our understanding of the universe (TED2018)
Dinesh Palipana	The barriers to becoming a doctor with quadriplegia (TEDxBrisbane 2018)
Dan Pallotta	The way we think about charity is dead wrong (TED2013)
Amanda Palmer	The art of asking (TED2013)
George Papandreou	Imagine a European democracy without borders (TEDGlobal 2013)
Sarah Parcak	Archeology from space (TED2012)
Eli Pariser	Beware online "filter bubbles" (TED2011)
Ji-Hae Park	The violin, and my dark night of the soul (TED2013)
Trita Parsi	Iran and Israel: Peace is possible (TEDGlobal 2013)
Devdutt Pattanaik	East vs. West — the myths that mystify (TEDIndia 2009)
Fredy Peccerelli	A forensic anthropologist who brings closure for the "disappeared" (TEDYouth 2014)
Enrique Peñalosa	Why buses represent democracy in action (TEDCity2.0 2013)
Maya Penn	Meet a young entrepreneur, cartoonist, designer, activist … (TEDWomen 2013)
Irene Pepperberg	Parrot Intelligence (TED2005)
Esther Perel	The secret to desire in a long-term relationship (TEDSalon NY2013); Rethinking infidelity ... a talk for anyone who has ever loved (TED2015)
David Perry	Are games better than life? (TED2006)
Philippe Petit	The journey across the high wire (TED2012)
Stephen Petranek	10 ways the world could end (TED2002)
Gregory Petsko	The coming neurological epidemic (TED2008)
Bertrand Piccard	My solar-powered adventure (TEDGlobal 2009)
T. Boone Pickens	Let's transform energy — with natural gas (TED2012)
Thomas Piketty	New thoughts on capital in the twenty-first century (TEDSalon Berlin 2014)
Pilobolus	A dance of "Symbiosis" (TED2005)
Daniel H. Pink	The puzzle of motivation (TEDGlobal 2009)
Steven Pinker	Human nature and the blank slate (TED2003); What our language habits reveal (TEDGlobal 2005); The surprising decline in violence (TED2007); The long reach of reason (TED2012)
Elizabeth Pisani	Sex, drugs and HIV — let's get rational (TED2010)
Mark Plotkin	What the people of the Amazon know that you don’t (TEDGlobal 2014)
David Pogue	Simplicity sells (TED2006); 10 top time-saving tech tips (TED2013)
Michael Pollan	A plant's-eye view (TED2007)
Jason Pontin	Can technology solve our big problems? (TED2013)
Christopher "moot" Poole	The case for anonymity online (TED2010)
Carolyn Porco	This is Saturn (TED2007); Could a Saturn moon harbor life? (TED2009)
Michael Porter	Why business can be good at solving social problems (TEDGlobal 2013)
Virginia Postrel	On glamour (TED2004)
Will Potter	The shocking move to criminalize nonviolent protest (TED2014)
Arthur Potts Dawson	A vision for sustainable restaurants (TEDGlobal 2010)
Samantha Power	A complicated hero in the war on dictatorship (TED2008)
Joshua Prager	In search of the man who broke my neck (TED2013)
Lakshmi Pratury	The lost art of letter-writing (TED2007)
Richard Preston	The mysterious lives of giant trees (TED2008)
Gavin Pretor-Pinney	Cloudy with a chance of joy (TEDGlobal 2013)
Joshua Prince-Ramus	Behind the design of Seattle's library (TED2006)
Andy Puddicombe	All it takes is 10 mindful minutes (TEDSalon London Fall 2012)
Lewis Pugh	How I swam the North Pole (TEDGlobal 2009); My mind-shifting Everest swim (TEDGlobal 2010)

== Q ==
Speaker	Talk(s)
Iqbal Quadir	How mobile phones can fight poverty (TEDGlobal 2005)

== R ==
Speaker	Talk(s)
Navi Radjou	Creative problem-solving in the face of extreme limits (TEDGlobal 2014)
Vilayanur Ramachandran	3 clues to understanding your brain (TED2007); The neurons that shaped civilization (TEDIndia 2009)
Kavita Ramdas	Radical women, embracing tradition (TEDIndia 2009)
James Randi	Homeopathy, quackery and fraud (TED2007)
Rajesh Rao	A Rosetta Stone for a lost language (TED2011)
Ramesh Raskar	Imaging at a trillion frames per second (TEDGlobal 2012)
Dilip Ratha	The hidden force in global economics: sending money home (TEDGlobal 2014)
Carlo Ratti	Architecture that senses and responds (TED2011)
Feisal Abdul Rauf	Lose your ego, find your compassion (TEDSalon 2009 Compassion)
Safi Rauf	A New Era (TED2022 | A New Era)
Eddi Reader	"What You've Got" (TED2003) "Kiteflyer's Hill" (TED2003)
Irwin Redlener	How to survive a nuclear attack (TED2008)
Preston Reed	A young guitarist meets his hero (TEDGlobal 2012)
Martin Rees	Is this our final century? (TEDGlobal 2005); Can we prevent the end of the world? (TED2014)
Rob Reid	The $8 billion iPod (TED2012)
Diana Reiss	The interspecies internet? An idea in progress (TED2013)
Shai Reshef	An ultra-low-cost college degree (TED2014)
Howard Rheingold	The new power of collaboration (TED2005)
Matthieu Ricard	The habits of happiness (TED2004); How to let altruism be your guide (TEDGlobal 2014)
Yoruba Richen	What the gay rights movement learned from the civil rights movement (TED2014)
Matt Ridley	When ideas have sex (TEDGlobal 2010)
Ian Ritchie	The day I turned down Tim Berners-Lee (TEDGlobal 2011)
Rives	If I controlled the Internet (TEDSalon 2006); A mockingbird remix of TED2006 (TED2006); The 4 a.m. mystery (TED2007); A story of mixed emoticons (TED2008); The Museum of Four in the Morning (TEDActive 2014)
Mary Roach	10 things you didn't know about orgasm (TED2009)
Apollo Robbins	The art of misdirection (TEDGlobal 2013)
Tony Robbins	Why we do what we do (TED2006)
Ken Robinson	How schools kill creativity (TED2006); Bring on the learning revolution! (TED2010); How to escape education's death valley (TED Talks Education 2013)
Geena Rocero	Why I must come out (TED2014)
Johan Rockström	Let the environment guide our development (TEDGlobal 2010)
David Rockwell	A memorial at Ground Zero (TED2002)
Joshua Roman	On violon and cello, "Passacaglia" (TED2011); The dancer, the singer, the cellist ... and a moment of creative magic (TED2015)
Paul Romer	Why the world needs charter cities (TEDGlobal 2009); The world's first charter city? (TED2011)
Pamela Ronald	The case for engineering our food (TED2015)
Jon Ronson	Strange answers to the psychopath test (TED2012); What happens when online shaming spirals out of control (TEDGlobalLondon 2015)
Mark Ronson	How sampling transformed music (TED2014)
David S. Rose	How to pitch to a VC (TED2007)
Steven Rosenbaum	The end of fake news (TED Res 2018) Innovate -- curation!(TEDx Grand Rapids 2011); Building a museum at Ground Zero (TED 2012)
Hanna Rosin	New data on the rise of women (TEDWomen 2010)
Hans Rosling	The best stats you've ever seen (TED2006); New insights on poverty (TED2007); Insights on HIV, in stunning data visuals (TED2009); Let my dataset change your mindset (TED@State 2009); Asia's rise — how and when (TEDIndia 2009); Global population growth, box by box (TED@Cannes 2010); The magic washing machine (TEDWomen 2010); How not to be ignorant about the world (TEDSalon Berlin 2014)
Ola Rosling	How not to be ignorant about the world (TEDSalon Berlin 2014)
Yves Rossy	Fly with the Jetman (TEDGlobal 2011)
Mark Roth	Suspended animation is within our grasp (TED2010)
Martine Rothblatt	My daughter, my wife, our robot, and the quest for immortality (TED2015)
Paul Rothemund	Playing with DNA that self-assembles (TED2007); DNA folding, in detail (TED2008)
Juliana Rotich	Meet BRCK, Internet access built for Africa (TEDGlobal 2013)
Bunker Roy	Learning from a barefoot movement (TEDGlobal 2011)
Deb Roy	The birth of a word (TED2011)
Kevin Rudd	Are China and the US doomed to conflict? (TED2015)
Hector Ruiz	The thinking behind 50x15 (TEDGlobal 2007)
Burt Rutan	The real future of space exploration (TED2006)

== S ==
Speaker	Talk(s)
Oliver Sacks	What hallucination reveals about our minds (TED2009)
Janette Sadik-Khan	New York's streets? Not so mean any more (TEDCity2.0 2013)
Donald Sadoway	The missing link to renewable energy (TED2012)
Moshe Safdie	Building uniqueness (TED2002); How to reinvent the apartment building (TED2014)
Stefan Sagmeister	Happiness by design (TED2004); Designing with slogans (TED2008); The power of time off (TEDGlobal 2009); 7 rules for making more happiness (TED@Cannes 2010)
Elyn Saks	A tale of mental illness — from the inside (TEDGlobal 2012)
Zainab Salbi	Women, wartime and the dream of peace (TEDGlobal 2010)
Renata Salecl	Our unhealthy obsession with choice (TEDGlobal 2013)
Sebastião Salgado	The silent drama of photography (TED2013)
Sheryl Sandberg	Why we have too few women leaders (TEDWomen 2010); So we leaned in ... now what? (TEDWomen 2013)
Michael Sandel	The lost art of democratic debate (TED2010); Why we shouldn't trust markets with our civic life (TEDGlobal 2013)
Laurie Santos	A monkey economy as irrational as ours (TEDGlobal 2010)
Mallika Sarabhai	Dance to change the world (TEDIndia 2009)
Dimitar Sasselov	How we found hundreds of potential Earth-like planets (TEDGlobal 2010)
Kailash Satyarthi	How to make peace? Get angry (TED2015)
Reshma Saujani	Teach girls bravery, not perfection (TED2016)
Mateo Salvatto	Talking With Deaf (TEDxRíodelaPlata 2020)
Susan Savage-Rumbaugh	The gentle genius of bonobos (TED2004)
Allan Savory	How to fight desertification and reverse climate change (TED2013)
Shaurya Singh	Cyber Crime: Asian Subcontinent vs. European and American Convention (TED2021)
Rebecca Saxe	How we read each other's minds (TEDGlobal 2009)
Keith Schacht	Toys and materials from the future (TED2005)
Andreas Schleicher	Use data to build better schools (TEDGlobal 2012)
Gavin Schmidt	The emergent patterns of climate change (TED2014)
Kathryn Schulz	On being wrong (TED2011); Don't regret regret (TEDSalon NY2011)
Laura Schulz	The surprisingly logical minds of babies (TED2015)
Barry Schwartz	The paradox of choice (TEDGlobal 2005); Our loss of wisdom (TED2009); Using our practical wisdom (TEDSalon NY2011 2010)
Louie Schwartzberg	The hidden beauty of pollination (TED2011); Hidden miracles of the natural world (TED2014)
Amber Scorah	What Cults Tell Us About Ourselves (TEDxPaloAltoSalon2019)
Sophie Scott	Why we laugh (TED2015)
Deborah Scranton	An Iraq war movie crowd-sourced from soldiers (TED2007)
Sara Seager	The search for planets beyond our solar system (TED2015)
Al Seckel	Visual illusions that show how we (mis)think (TED2004)
eL Seed	Street art with a message of hope and peace (TED2015)
Parul Sehgal	An ode to envy (TEDSalon NY2013)
Martin Seligman	The new era of positive psychology (TED2004)
Ricardo Semler	How to run a company with (almost) no rules (TEDGlobal 2014)
Maurizio Seracini	The secret lives of paintings (TEDGlobal 2012)
Paul Sereno	Digging up dinosaurs (TED2005)
Sebastian Seung	I am my connectome (TEDGlobal 2010)
Elif Shafak	The politics of fiction (TEDGlobal 2010)
Sonia Shah	3 reasons we still haven’t gotten rid of malaria (TEDGlobal 2013)
Ananda Shankar Jayant	Fighting cancer with dance (TEDIndia 2009)
Aditi Shankardass	A second opinion on developmental disorders (TEDIndia 2009)
Tom Shannon	Anti-gravity sculpture (TED2003); The painter and the pendulum (TED in the Field 2009)
Toby Shapshak	You don't need an app for that (TEDGlobal 2013)
Tali Sharot	The optimism bias (TED2012)
Josette Sheeran	Ending hunger now (TEDGlobal 2011)
Michael Shermer	Why people believe weird things (TED2006); The pattern behind self-deception (TED2010)
Sxip Shirey	A performance with breath, music, passion (TED2008)
Stephanie "Steve" Shirley	Why do ambitious women have flat heads? (TED2015)
Clay Shirky	Institutions vs. collaboration (TEDGlobal 2005); How social media can make history (TED@State 2009); How cognitive surplus will change the world (TED@Cannes 2010); Why SOPA is a bad idea (TEDSalon NY2012); How the Internet will (one day) transform government (TEDGlobal 2012)
Ben Shneiderman	User Interfaces for Searching (TED1998)
Alan Siegel	Let's simplify legal jargon! (TED2010)
Steve Silberman	The forgotten history of autism (TED2015)
Jay Silver	Hack a banana, make a keyboard! (TEDSalon NY2013)
Joshua Silver	Adjustable liquid-filled eyeglasses (TEDGlobal 2009)
Nate Silver	Does racism affect how you vote? (TED2009)
Sarah Silverman	A new perspective on the number 3000 (TED2010)
Taryn Simon	Photographs of secret sites (TEDGlobal 2009); The stories behind the bloodlines (TEDSalon London Fall 2011)
Cameron Sinclair	My wish: A call for open-source architecture (TED2006) TED Prize; The refugees of boom-and-bust (TED2009)
Simon Sinek	Why good leaders make you feel safe (TED2014)
P.W. Singer	Military robots and the future of war (TED2009)
Peter Singer	The why and how of effective altruism (TED2013)
Pawan Sinha	How brains learn to see (TEDIndia 2009)
Sivamani	Rhythm is everything, everywhere (TEDIndia 2009)
Jeff Skoll	My journey into movies that matter (TED2007)
Anne-Marie Slaughter	Can we all "have it all"? (TEDGlobal 2013)
Sleepy Man Banjo Boys	Teen wonders play bluegrass (TED@New York 2012); Bluegrass virtuosity from ... New Jersey? (TED2013)
Gary Slutkin	Let's treat violence like a contagious disease (TEDMED 2013)
Amy Smith	Simple designs to save a life (TED2006)
Jeff Smith	Lessons in business ... from prison (TED@New York 2012)
Willie Smits	How to restore a rainforest (TED2009)
Lee Smolin	Science and democracy (TED2003)
Edward Snowden	Here's how we take back the Internet (TED2014)
Laura Snyder	The Philosophical Breakfast Club (TEDGlobal 2012)
Jill Sobule	Global warming's theme song, "Manhattan in January" (TED2006); The Jill and Julia Show (TED2007)
Christopher Soghoian	Government surveillance — this is just the beginning (TED Fellows Retreat 2013)
Andrew Solomon	Love, no matter what (TEDMED 2013); How the worst moments in our lives make us who we are (TED2014)
Somi	The dancer, the singer, the cellist ... and a moment of creative magic (TED2015)
Didier Sornette	How we can predict the next financial crisis (TEDGlobal 2013)
Alec Soth	This is what enduring love looks like (TED2015)
Michael Specter	The danger of science denial (TED2010)
Adam Spencer	Why I fell in love with monster prime numbers (TED2013)
Malte Spitz	Your phone company is watching (TEDGlobal 2012)
Marla Spivak	Why bees are disappearing (TEDGlobal 2013)
Morgan Spurlock	The greatest TED Talk ever sold (TED2011)
Paul Stamets	6 ways mushrooms can save the world (TED2008)
Andrew Stanton	The clues to a great story (TED2012)
Philippe Starck	Design and destiny (TED2007)
James Stavridis	A Navy Admiral's thoughts on global security (TEDGlobal 2012)
Alex Steffen	The route to a sustainable future (TEDGlobal 2005); The shareable future of cities (TEDGlobal 2011)
David Steindl-Rast	Want to be happy? Be grateful (TEDGlobal 2013)
Nicholas Stern	The state of the climate — and what we might do about it (TED@Unilever 2014)
Michael Stevens	How much does a video weigh? (TED-Ed 2013)
Molly Stevens	A new way to grow bone (TEDGlobal 2013)
Bryan Stevenson	We need to talk about an injustice (TED2012)
Stew	"Black Men Ski" (TED2006)
Rory Stewart	Time to end the war in Afghanistan (TEDGlobal 2011)
Sting	How I started writing songs again (TED2014)
Gregory Stock	To upgrade is human (TED2003)
Clifford Stoll	The call to learn (TED2006)
Jim Stolze	Can you live without the Internet? (TED University 2009)
Bill Stone	I'm going to the moon. Who's with me? (TED2007)
Kevin Stone	The bio-future of joint replacement (TED2010)
Bill Strickland	Rebuilding a neighborhood with beauty, dignity, hope (TED2002)
Steven Strogatz	The science of sync (TED2004)
Tristram Stuart	The global food waste scandal (TEDSalon London Spring 2012)
Daniel Suarez	The kill decision shouldn't belong to a robot (TEDGlobal 2013)
Pavan Sukhdev	Put a value on nature! (TEDGlobal 2011)
Kevin Surace	Eco-friendly drywall (TED2009)
James Surowiecki	The power and the danger of online crowds (TED2005)
Rachel Sussman	The world's oldest living things (TEDGlobal 2010)
Adora Svitak	What adults can learn from kids (TED2010)
Robert Swan	Let's save the last pristine continent (TEDGlobal 2014)
Fred Swaniker	The leaders who ruined Africa, and the generation who can fix it (TEDGlobal 2014)
Julia Sweeney	Letting go of God (TED2006); The Jill and Julia Show (TED2007); It's time for "The Talk" (TED2010)

== T ==
Speaker	Talk(s)
Alex Tabarrok	How ideas trump crises (TED2009)
Jackie Tabick	The balancing act of compassion (TEDSalon 2009 Compassion)
Itay Talgam	Lead like the great conductors (TEDGlobal 2009)
Daniel Tammet	Different ways of knowing (TED2011)
Amy Tan	Where does creativity hide? (TED2008)
Chade-Meng Tan	Everyday compassion at Google (TEDPrize@UN 2010)
Nina Tandon	Caring for engineered tissue (TED2011); Could tissue engineering mean personalized medicine? (TEDGlobal 2012)
Don Tapscott	Four principles for the open world (TEDGlobal 2012)
Jill Tarter	Join the SETI search (TED2009)
Jill Bolte Taylor	My stroke of insight (TED2008)
Anastasia Taylor-Lind	Fighters and mourners of the Ukrainian revolution (TEDGlobal 2014)
Julie Taymor	Spider-Man, The Lion King, and life on the creative edge (TED2011)
Marco Tempest	The magic of truth and lies (and iPods) (TEDGlobal 2011); Augmented reality, techno-magic (TEDGlobal 2011); A magical tale (with augmented reality) (TED2012); The electric rise and fall of Nikola Tesla (TED2012); A cyber-magic card trick like no other (TEDGlobal 2012); And for my next trick, a robot (TED2014)
Shashi Tharoor	Why nations should pursue soft power (TEDIndia 2009)
They Might Be Giants	Wake up! (TED2007)
Jer Thorp	Make data more human (TEDxVancouver 2011)
Sebastian Thrun	Google's driverless car (TED2011)
Robert Thurman	We can be Buddhas (TEDSalon 2006)
Skylar Tibbits	Can we make things that make themselves? (TED2011); The emergence of "4D printing" (TED2013)
Michael Tilson Thomas	Music and emotion through time (TED2012)
Krista Tippett	(TEDPrize@UN 2010)
Anuj Tiwari	Past is not our future (TEDxCGCMohali)
Tânia Tomé	Succenergy Activate Your Energy Discover your Success Inside You (TED2017)
Eric Topol	The wireless future of medicine (TEDMED 2009)
Rokia Traoré	"M'Bifo" (TEDGlobal 2007) "Kounandi" (TEDGlobal 2007)
Ahn Trio	A modern take on piano, violin, cello (TEDWomen 2010)
Mena Trott	Meet the founder of the blog revolution (TED2006)
Steve Truglia	A leap from the edge of space (TEDGlobal 2009)
Natasha Tsakos	A multimedia theatrical adventure (TED2009)
Michael Tubbs	The political power of being a good neighbor (TED2019)
Gever Tulley	5 dangerous things you should let your kids do (TED2007); Life lessons through tinkering (TED2009)
Luca Turin	The science of scent (TED2005)
Sherry Turkle	Connected, but alone? (TED2012)
Neil Turok	My wish: Find the next Einstein in Africa (TED2008) TED Prize

== U ==
Speaker	Talk(s)
Tim Urban	Inside the mind of a master procrastinator (TED2016)

== V ==
Speaker	Talk(s)
Varun Pradip Dave	Never let your dreams die (2021 TEDxPrahladnagar)
Stephan Van Dam	Understanding Maps (2002)
Yossi Vardi	We're worried about local warming ... in your lap (TED2007)
Anand Varma	The first 21 days of a bee's life (TED2015)
Naná Vasconcelos	Hidden music rituals around the world (TEDGlobal 2014)
Sadhguru Jaggi Vasudev	Majestic chaos (TEDIndia 2009)
Nick Veasey	Exposing the invisible (TEDGlobal 2009)
James Veitch	This is what happens when you reply to spam email (TEDGlobal 2015) The agony of trying to unsubscribe (TEDSummit 2016)
Craig Venter	Sampling the ocean's DNA (TEDGlobal 2005); On the verge of creating synthetic life (TED2008); Watch me unveil "synthetic life" (TED in the Field 2010)
Abraham Verghese	A doctor's touch (TEDGlobal 2011)
Angelo Vermeulen	How to go to space, without having to go to space (TEDGlobal 2014)
Eva Vertes	Meet the future of cancer research (TED2005)
Xavier Vilalta	Architecture at home in its community (TEDGlobal 2013)
Martin Villeneuve	How I made an impossible film (TED2013)
Jeshurun Vincent	Accepting Changes by a Travelling Musician! (TEDxAPUKL 2020)
Saša Vučinić	Why we should invest in a free press (TED2016)

== W ==
Speaker	Talk(s)
Jimmy Wales	The birth of Wikipedia (TEDGlobal 2005)
Jay Walker	My library of human imagination (TED2008); The world's English mania (TED2009)
Karen Thompson Walker	What fear can teach us (TEDGlobal 2012)
Lucianne Walkowicz	Finding planets around other stars (TED2011); Let's not use Mars as a backup planet (TED2015)
Kelly Wanser	Emergency medicine for our climate fever (TEDSummit 2019)
Peter Ward	A theory of Earth's mass extinctions (TED2008)
Frank Warren	Half a million secrets (TED2012)
Rick Warren	A life of purpose (TED2006)
Abigail Washburn	Building US-China relations ... by banjo (TED2012)
James Watson	How we discovered DNA (TED2005)
Reggie Watts	Beats that defy boxes (TED2012)
Ruby Wax	What's so funny about mental illness? (TEDGlobal 2012)
Amy Webb	How I hacked online dating (TEDSalon NY2013)
Ursus Wehrli	Tidying up art (TED2006)
Spencer Wells	A family tree for humanity (TEDGlobal 2007)
Leana Wen	What your doctor won’t disclose (TEDMED 2014)
Margaret Wertheim	The beautiful math of coral (TED2009)
Geoffrey West	The surprising math of cities and corporations (TEDGlobal 2011)
Eric Whitacre	A virtual choir 2,000 voices strong (TED2011); Virtual Choir Live (TED2013)
Romulus Whitaker	The real danger lurking in the water (TEDIndia 2009)
George Whitesides	Toward a science of simplicity (TED2010)
Edith Widder	The weird, wonderful world of bioluminescence (TED2011); How we found the giant squid (TED2013)
Willard Wigan	Hold your breath for micro-sculpture (TEDGlobal 2009)
John Wilbanks	Let's pool our medical data (TEDGlobal 2012)
Richard Wilkinson	How economic inequality harms societies (TEDGlobal 2011)
C.K. Williams	Poetry of youth and age (TED2001)
Evan Williams	The voices of Twitter users (TED2009)
Jody Williams	A realistic vision for world peace (TEDWomen 2010)
E.O. Wilson	My wish: build the encyclopedia of ife (TED2007) TED Prize; Advice to young scientists (TEDMED 2012)
Taylor Wilson	Yup, I built a nuclear fusion reactor (TED2012); My radical plan for small nuclear fission reactors (TED2013)
Steven Wise	Chimps have feelings and thoughts. They should also have rights (TED2015)
Siegfried Woldhek	The search for the true face of Leonardo (TED2008)
Gary Wolf	The quantified self (TED@Cannes 2010)
Nathan Wolfe	The jungle search for viruses (TED2009); What's left to explore? (TED2012)
Stefan Wolff	The path to ending ethnic conflicts (TEDGlobal 2010)
Conrad Wolfram	Teaching kids real math with computers (TEDGlobal 2010)
Stephen Wolfram	Computing a theory of all knowledge (TED2010)
Daniel Wolpert	The real reason for brains (TEDGlobal 2011)
John Wooden	The difference between winning and succeeding (TED2001)
Robert Wright	Progress is not a zero-sum game (TED2006); The evolution of compassion (TEDSalon 2009 Compassion)
Will Wright	Spore, birth of a game (TED2007)
Sheryl WuDunn	Our century's greatest injustice (TEDGlobal 2010)
Tom Wujec	3 ways the brain creates meaning (TED2009); Learn to use the 13th-century astrolabe (TEDGlobal 2009); Build a tower, build a team (TED2010); Got a wicked problem? First, tell me how you make toast (TEDGlobal 2013)
Richard Saul Wurman	30th TED birthday celebration (TED2014)

== Y ==
Speaker	Talk(s)
Ziauddin Yousafzai	My daughter, Malala (TED2014)

== Z ==
Speaker	Talk(s)
Ray Zahab	My trek to the South Pole (TED2009)
Paul J. Zak	Trust, morality — and oxytocin? (TEDGlobal 2011)
Benjamin Zander	The transformative power of classical music (TED2008)
Maysoon Zayid	I got 99 problems... palsy is just one (TEDWomen 2013)
Eva Zeisel	The playful search for beauty (TED2001)
Philip Zimbardo	The psychology of evil (TED2008); The psychology of time (TED2009); The demise of guys? (TED2011)
Jonathan Zittrain	The Web as random acts of kindness (TEDGlobal 2009)
Ethan Zuckerman	Listening to global voices (TEDGlobal 2010)
Marlene Zuk	What we learn from insects’ kinky sex lives (TEDWomen 2015)

== See also ==
- TED Prize
