= Vertes =

Vertes, Vértes or Vertès may refer to:

- Eva Vertes (born 1985), American cancer researcher
- Marcel Vertès (1895–1961), Hungarian costume designer
- Vértes Hills, mountain range in Hungary
  - Battle of Vértes, 1051
- Les Négresses Vertes, French musical group
