= Adventure =

Exciting or unusual experience

An adventure is a novel and exciting undertaking that is typically bold, sometimes risky. Adventures may be activities with danger such as traveling, exploring, skydiving, mountain climbing, scuba diving, river rafting, other extreme sports, or, importantly, any other activity that may be new, fresh or difficult and may even lead to failure. Adventure can take many forms beyond the typically described outdoor area. Adventures are often undertaken to create psychological arousal or in order to achieve a greater goal, such as the pursuit of knowledge that can only be obtained by such activities.

== Motivation ==
Adventurous experiences create psychological arousal, which can be interpreted as negative (e.g. fear) or positive (e.g. flow). For some people, adventure becomes a major pursuit in and of itself. According to adventurer André Malraux, in his Man's Fate (1933), "If a man is not ready to risk his life, where is his dignity?"

Similarly, Helen Keller stated that "Life is either a daring adventure or nothing."

Outdoor adventurous activities are typically undertaken for the purposes of recreation or excitement: examples are adventure racing and adventure tourism. Adventurous activities can also lead to gains in knowledge, such as those undertaken by explorers and pioneers – the British adventurer Jason Lewis, for example, uses adventures to draw global sustainability lessons from living within finite environmental constraints on expeditions to share with schoolchildren. Adventure education intentionally uses challenging experiences for learning.

Author Jon Levy suggests that an experience should meet several criteria to be considered an adventure:

1. Be remarkable—that is, worth talking about
2. Involve adversity or perceived risk
3. Bring about personal growth.

== Mythology and fiction ==
Some of the oldest and most widespread stories in the world are stories of adventure, such as Homer's Odyssey.

The knight errant was the form the "adventure seeker" character took in the Late Middle Ages.

Adventure fiction exhibits these "protagonist on adventurous journey" characteristics, as do many popular feature films, such as Star Wars and Raiders of the Lost Ark.

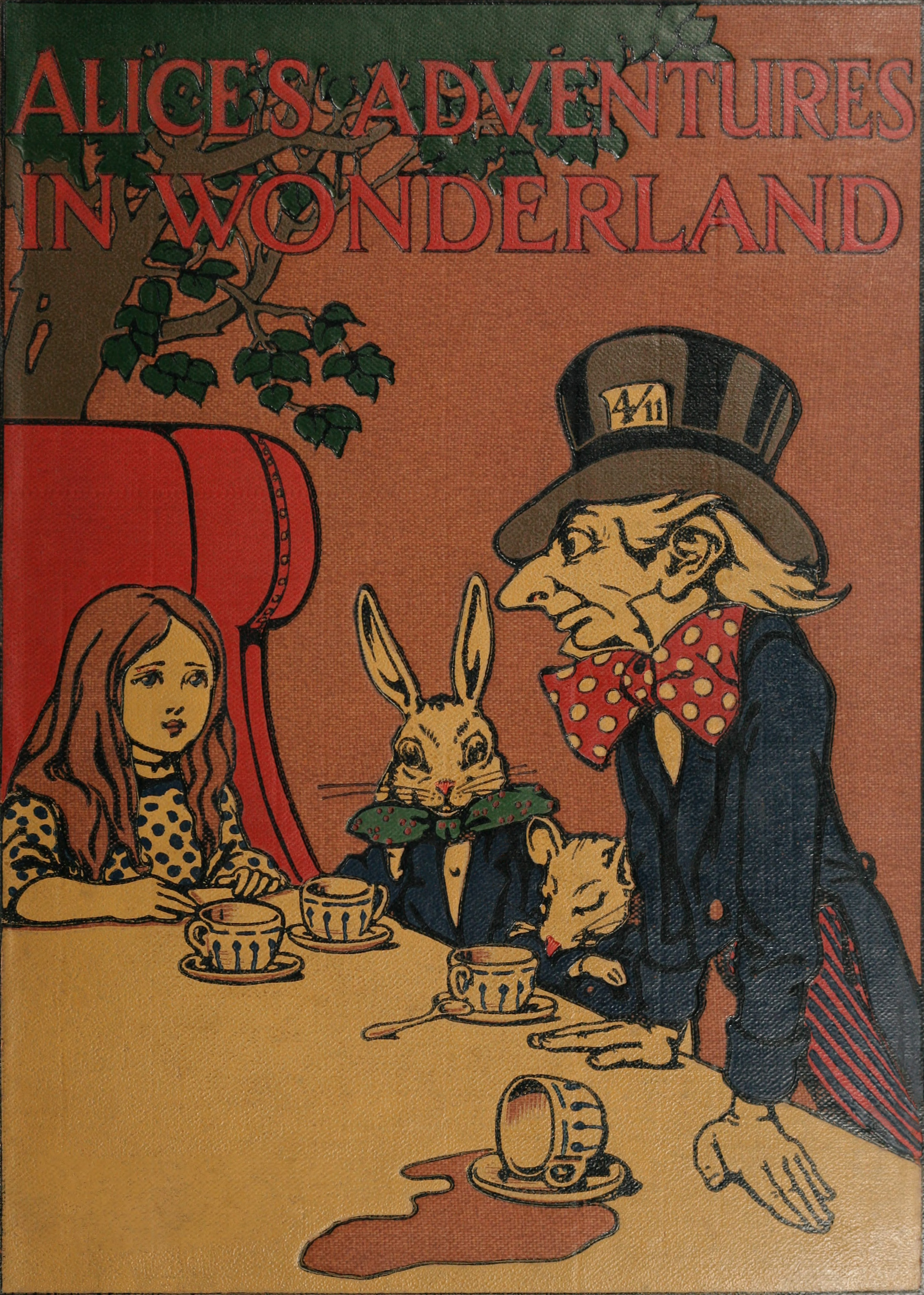
Lewis Carroll's Alice's Adventures in Wonderland is a well-known example of a fantasized adventure story.

=== Outdoors ===
Adventure books may have the theme of the hero or main character going to face the wilderness or Mother Nature. Examples include books such as Hatchet or My Side of the Mountain. These books are less about "questing", such as in mythology or other adventure novels, but more about surviving on their own, living off the land, gaining new experiences, and becoming closer to the natural world.

=== Questing ===
Many adventures are based on the idea of a quest: the hero goes off in pursuit of a reward, whether it be a skill, prize, treasure, or perhaps the safety of a person. On the way, the hero must overcome various obstacles to obtain their reward.

=== Video games ===
In video game culture, an adventure game is a video game in which the player assumes the role of a protagonist in an interactive story driven by exploration and puzzle solving. The genre's focus on story allows it to draw heavily from other narrative-based media, literature and film, encompassing a wide variety of literary genres. Many adventure games (text and graphic) are designed for a single player, since this emphasis on story and character makes multi-player design difficult.

== Nonfiction works ==
From ancient times, travelers and explorers have written about their adventures. Journals which became best-sellers in their day were written, such as Marco Polo's journal The Travels of Marco Polo or Mark Twain's Roughing It. Others were personal journals, only later published, such as the journals of Meriwether Lewis and William Clark or Captain James Cook's journals. There are also books written by those not directly a part of the adventure in question, such as The Right Stuff by Tom Wolfe or books written by those participating in the adventure but in a format other than that of a journal, such as Conquistadors of the Useless by Lionel Terray. Documentaries often use the theme of adventure as well.

== Adventure sports ==
There are many sports classified as adventure sports, due to their inherent danger and excitement. Some of these include mountain climbing, skydiving, or other extreme sports.

== Vehicles ==
- Adventure motorcycle
- Adventure van
- Adventure vehicle

== See also ==
- Adventure film
- Adventure playground
- Adventure travel
- Exploration
- Filibuster (military)
- List of genres
- Novelty seeking
- Overlanding
- Sports
- Tourism
