= Parikrma Humanity Foundation =

- Founded: 2003
- Founder: Shukla Bose
- Type: Humanitarian Foundation
- Purpose: Education
- Location: Bangalore, India
- Region served: Bangalore

Parikrma Humanity Foundation is a non-profit organization located in Bangalore, India. Parikrma addresses the growing gap in urban India between those benefiting from economic liberalization and those who are not. Consequently, only a minority of children in India can afford access to private schools where the quality of education is high and taught in English. Children from slums and rural communities attend free government-run schools, where instruction is in the state language, which often proves insufficient for attaining job opportunities in a rapidly globalizing world.

The name Parikrma comes from a combination of two Sanskrit words, "pari" meaning circle, and "krma" meaning to complete. Parikrma strives to complete "The Circle of Life" by supporting children from kindergarten until they secure a job, thus ensuring that their students break out of the cycle of poverty.

Parikrma runs four Centres for Learning and a Junior College for 2,000 children from 99 slum communities and four orphanages in Bangalore. Parikrma is a nondenominational nonprofit that does not discriminate on the basis of caste, creed, or religion.

Parikrma was certified as a Great Place to Work in 2020.

== History ==
In 2003, 165 children from marginalized families started a new chapter in life, huddled together on a small rooftop in a school in Rajendra Nagar, Bengaluru. Today, they are ranked the Number 1 Social Impact School in India (Education World, 2019–20).

Parikrma:

- Operates four K-10 schools and one Junior College (Grades 11 & 12) spread across Bangalore.
- Has more than 1,800 children, 52% of whom are girls.
- Draws students from 105 slum communities and five orphanages across Bangalore.

Parikrma has the highest attendance in the country at 96% and the lowest dropout rate at less than 1%. Many of their students have attended the Global Youth Leadership Summit in San Diego over the years and continue to do so. At Parikrma, children have the widest possible exposure to ensure they can access equal opportunities, even in academics, sports, and other extracurricular activities. Their teachers have been part of the British Council Global School Exchange Program and have traveled to schools in the UK as part of their training.

Parikrma Humanity Foundation provides English medium education to the poorest from the slums of Bangalore, India. Built around the CBSE curriculum, education at Parikrma includes sports, art, music, theatre, dance, and wide exposure to the world. Parikrma also provides each child with three meals a day, comprehensive healthcare, and family care.

The Parikrma Model allows for a child to be mentored right from Kindergarten until they get a job. Parikrma manages K-12 education through four Centers for Learning and a Junior College for 1,802 children from 99 slum communities and four orphanages. College scholarships are given to each child to complete professional education or training.

Parikrma graduates are leading change. They include a software engineer with Cisco Systems, an assistant chef at Hilton, a dialysis therapist at Manipal Hospital, a marathoner, a digital designer, artists, social workers, entrepreneurs (a catering company, a sports development firm, etc.), a dentist, an activist and avid blogger, an actress, a student pursuing law at the prestigious National Law School, and a biotechnology student at MS Ramaiah. The list grows longer and more diverse with each passing year.

== Educational Philosophy ==
Parikrma's educational philosophy rests on "The Four Pillars":

1. Empowering children by imparting superior knowledge, mental and physical skills, and good values.
2. Providing real-life experiences and enhancing useful life skills.
3. Encouraging self-expression through art, music, dance, and other creative forms.
4. Offering exposure to a wide range of knowledge, viewpoints, activities, and more.

== Academic Focus and Programs ==
Parikrma has adopted the CBSE English curriculum, built around the concept of understanding and making learning fun and experiential.

Parikrma operates on a 360-degree development model, supporting various aspects of a child's life. They provide three meals a day, comprehensive healthcare including regular health check-ups, immunizations, and counseling, and community support for parents, including de-addiction programs, women's empowerment, wellness workshops, vocational skills, and more.

Parikrma also believes in an end-to-end (e2e) model in which they look after a child from kindergarten until they are placed in a job, ensuring that they break out of the cycle of poverty, which they call completing "the Circle of Life." Their Final Leap program aids students in choosing the right professional course that matches their strengths and interests, or provides scholarships to pursue college or vocational training. Their Last Mile program provides a professional mentor while students acclimate to their first year in the workplace.

== Impact ==
Alumni: The first batch of Parikrma students are now pursuing higher education and beginning to enter the workforce. Alumni from Parikrma are studying at various universities in Bangalore, such as the MR Ambedkar Dental College, National Law School of India University, KLE Law College, and M. S. Ramaiah Institute of Technology. They have also pursued jobs such as a dialysis therapist at Manipal Teaching Hospital, a software engineer at Cisco Systems, and as an assistant chef at the Hilton Hotel in Bangalore. Today, there are more than 300 students pursuing higher studies sponsored by Parikrma. These students are studying law, engineering, gaming, animation, design coding, paramedical courses, fashion technology and Parikrma has opened up doors for more creative and new age career choices. Parikrma students represent the country in Global Youth Leadership Summit in San Diego, and others do book reviews with schools from Seattle, London, and Norway.

Parikrma FC: This club was born in 2013. They are currently Bangalore A Division team.

Parikrma Girls FC: In 2018, Parikrma formed an all-girls football club in Bangalore.

Awards: Parikrma Humanity Foundation has been awarded the Derozio Award for excellence in special education and social commitment. Parikrma also received the Governor's award for exemplary social work in January 2007. The organisation is now a chapter included in Cornell University and IIMB. We received the CNBC Digitalizing India Award 2016 for the category of Digital Innovation in Driving Social Impact and the CSR Awards for being one of the 50 Most Impactful Social Innovators in 2016. Parikrma won the Indian Achievers Award 2020 for Education Excellence.

Publications: Parikrma has so far published three papers on education and impact in international journals:

- Overcoming barriers to learning – the Parikrma way
- Moving the needle of learning and academic progress of students through motivation and support: a case study of a chain of schools from Bangalore, India
- Changing political ideologies and its impact on education policies: case study of India in comparison with China and the US

== Expansion and Scale ==
Community Development: The Community Development Services team is made up of social workers.

Education Transformation Centre (ETC): Through ETC, launched in July 2014, Parikrma creates and offers teacher training modules to teachers, other NGO workers, school administrators and social entrepreneurs. The ETC began its operations in July, 2014. Teachers from 200 government schools are being trained and mentored to bring about change in the state education system, and Parikrma's goal is to influence 60,000 children through its Centres as well as the ETC.

Adopted 5 Government Schools: Parikrma has adopted a school in 2017 – the Maruthinagar Government School. Parikrma has signed a MoU with the Government of Karnataka to bring about a change in academics, and overall development of children and performance at government schools. Over 500 children at the school are set to benefit from this new initiative. There has been a 60% increment in enrollment and 80% attendance in the Parent Teachers Meeting since inception.
