= Adam Ostrow =

American businessman, writer and speaker

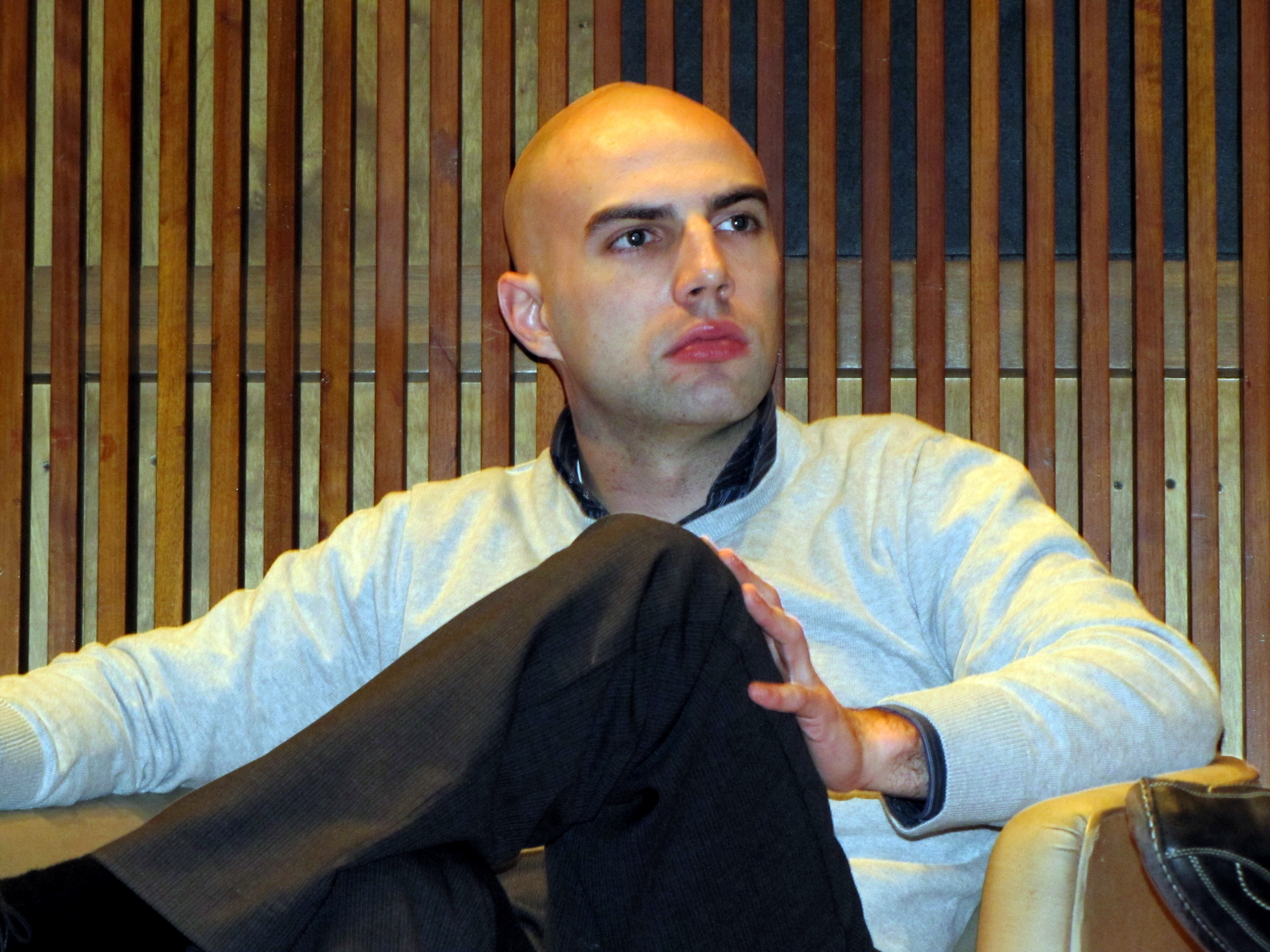
Adam Ostrow in 2010

Adam Ostrow is an American businessman, writer and speaker who currently serves as the Chief Digital Officer at TEGNA Inc.

Before joining TEGNA, Ostrow was Chief Strategy Officer at Mashable. He was hired by Pete Cashmore as online news site Mashable.com's first Editor in Chief in 2007 and contributed more than 2,500 articles to the site on topics including social media, technology and marketing trends.

During his time at Mashable, Ostrow also spoke at numerous industry events and conferences, including the Cannes Lions, SXSW, Consumer Electronics Show and Digitas NewFront. His work at the site also included introducing Mashable's video program and the Mashable Publisher Platform. Ostrow's TED talk "After the Final Status Update" on the subject of how social media profiles live on after individual users die has been viewed more than 1,100,000 times as of July 2017.
