= Siegfried Woldhek =

Dutch artist and illustrator (born 1951)

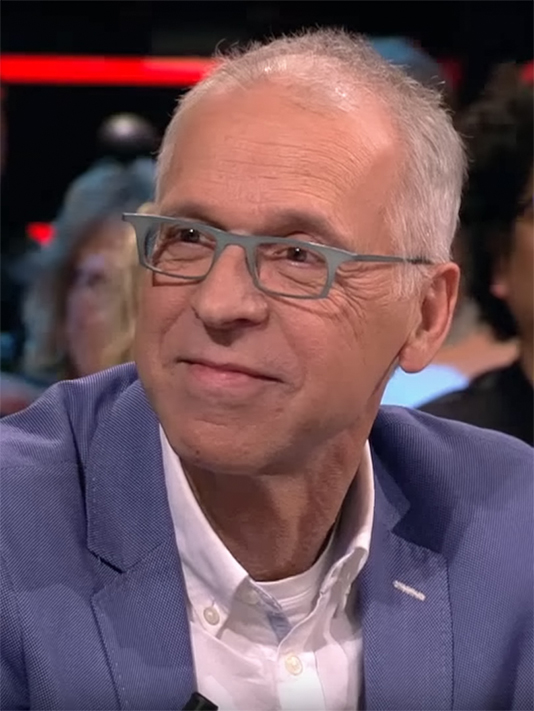
Siegfried Woldhek (2017)

Siegfried Woldhek (born May 14, 1951) is a Dutch artist and illustrator. He was the CEO of the Dutch branch of World Wildlife Fund. And he is the founder of the non-profit organization Nabuur. In a 2008 four-minute Ted Talk he explains how he - as an experienced portraitist himself - discovered the true face of Leonardo da Vinci.

== Portraits ==
Woldhek is mostly known for the numerous portraits and caricatures of writers and politicians he made since 1976 for books, magazines, newspapers and museum collections, including the Metropolitan Museum of Art, in New York City and The New York Review of Books.

== Awards ==
2002 Order of the Golden Arc, by Prince Bernhard of Lippe-Biesterfeld, for contributions to conservation.

2002 G.H. 's-Gravesande-prize, for literary achievements, for his writer portraits
