= Mashable =

International media platform

- Company type: Subsidiary
- Website type: Digital media, news
- Available in: English; French; Dutch; Italian; Hindi
- Founded: 2005; 21 years ago
- Headquarters: New York City
- Area served: United States; United Kingdom; Benelux; India; Middle East; Southeast Asia; Pakistan; Italy; Australia; Turkey; Indonesia
- Founder: Pete Cashmore
- Key people: Pete Cashmore
- Parent: Ziff Davis (December 2017 – present)
- Subsidiaries: CineFix; Mashable Studios
- Website: mashable.com
- Current status: Active

Mashable is a news website, digital media platform and entertainment company founded by Pete Cashmore in 2005.

== History ==
Mashable was founded by 19-year-old Pete Cashmore while living in Aberdeen, Scotland, in July 2004. Early iterations of the site were a simple WordPress blog, with Cashmore as sole author. In 2007, Adam Ostrow was hired as the site's first editor-in-chief. Fame came relatively quickly, with Time magazine noting Mashable as one of the 25 best blogs of 2009. By 2011, the website boasted 15 million unique monthly visitors and four million followers across its social media accounts.

In September 2011, Mashable announced it would expand into entertainment and news.Lance Ulanoff was hired to oversee all editorial content. Ostrow became executive editor. In March 2012, it was reported that Cashmore was in talks to sell the business to CNN. That year, the company launched Velocity, its proprietary technology for predicting viral content. A mobile version was released in 2013. By 2014, it was licensing Velocity to external partners.

Mashable began putting significant focus on video content. It partnered with Collective Digital Studios in 2013. In 2014, the company received $14 million in funding from Updata Partners. In May, comedian Elliott Morgan began working with Mashable on a YouTube show. It received $17 million from Time Warner Investments the following year. In June 2015, the company launched Mashable Studios to focus on serialized video programming and branded entertainment for its website, social networks, and TV partners. The company was added to Snapchat's Discover page. In November, it launched the Mashable Shop in partnership with Visa. By the end of the year, Mashable had 27 million monthly unique visitors.

Between 2014 and 2016, Mashable announced partnerships with Comcast's Watchable platform, Bravo Media, Telemundo, Facebook Live, Amazon Video Direct, and Verizon's go90. In 2016, Turner Broadcasting invested $15 million in the company. Mashable then began creating digital content for Turner.

Soon after, the company moved away from its focus on news, in favor of video, resulting in the elimination of 30 roles. In June, it acquired YouTube channel CineFix from Whalerock Industries. Jessica Coen, formerly of Gawker and Jezebel, was hired in October as the company's first executive editor. For the year, revenue grew 36% to $42 million, but the company still saw $10 million in losses.

By 2017, Mashable videos were generating 1.6 billion views a month. The company was valued at $250 million. It began publishing e-commerce content in June. Mashable's San Francisco office was closed in October. In August, it was reported that Cashmore was working with a bank to acquire more capital.

In December 2017, Ziff Davis bought Mashable for $50 million, a price described by Recode as a "fire sale" price. Mashable had not been meeting its advertising targets, accumulating $4.2 million in losses in the quarter ending September 2017. A leaked document obtained by Business Insider revealed that the company's revenue was disproportionately reliant on ad revenue and that the high cost of rent for its offices in New York, Los Angeles, San Francisco, London, and Singapore left it with little cash on hand. After the sale, Mashable laid off 50 staff, including many in its video division, but preserved top management. In 2018, Mashable extended its partnership with Telemundo with a weekly tech segment for linear TV.

In June 2021, Jessica Coen, Mashable's editor-in-chief, left the company to join Morning Brew. Alesha Williams Boyd was hired to replace her in January 2022. The brand had just over 50 staffers at this time.

== International editions ==
Mashable has operated several international versions of its website.

In 2014, the company launched Mashable UK and Mashable Australia. It expanded into Asia in 2015 by opening a Singapore office and creating Mashable India in partnership with Penske Media Corporation.

Mashable partnered with France 24 to create a French language website in 2016. Together with Tencent, the company launched in China in 2017.

Following its acquisition by Ziff Davis, the Mashable office in Asia was closed. Additional international editions have been introduced, such as Mashable Middle East, Southeast Asia, Benelux, Italy, and Pakistan.

== See also ==
- BuzzFeed
- The Onion
- Upworthy
- Vice Media
- Vox Media
