= Ursus Wehrli =

Swiss comedian and artist

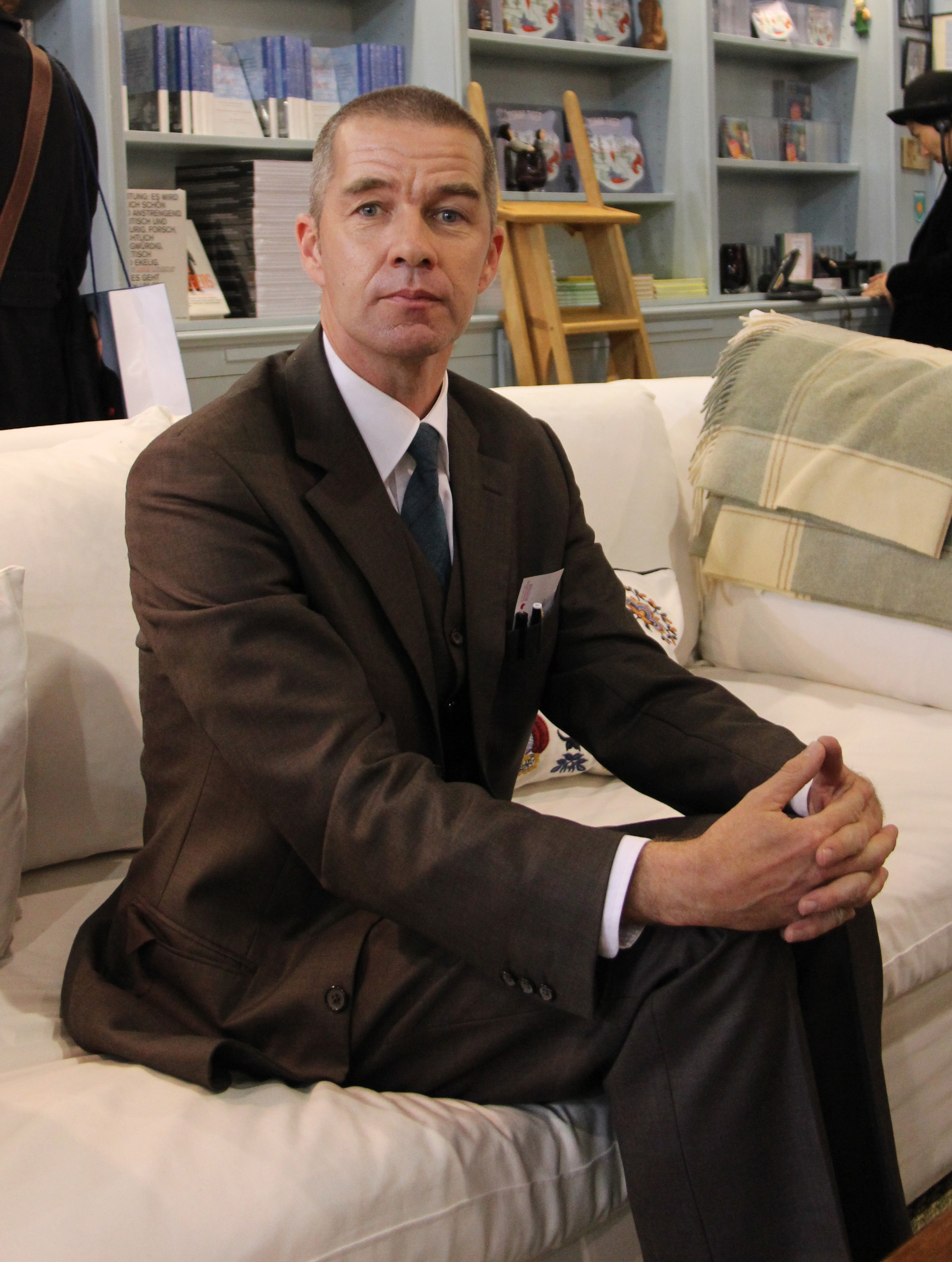
Ursus Wehrli (2011)

Ursus Wehrli (born 1969) is a Swiss comedian and artist. He makes books in which he humorously "tidies up" works of art.

In 2012, he designed a stamp for the Swiss Post.

== Books ==
- Kunst aufräumen, Zürich, Kein & Aber, 2002, ISBN 3-0369-5200-4.
- Noch mehr Kunst aufräumen, Zürich, Kein & Aber, 2004, ISBN 3-03-695223-3.
  - Both volumes were published also in French, Italian and English:
  - L'art en bazar, Éditions Milan (Fr.)
  - L'arte a soqquadro, Edizione il Castoro (Itl.)
  - Tidying Up Art, Prestel Publishing (Engl.)
- Die Kunst, aufzuräumen, Zürich, Kein & Aber, 2011, ISBN 3-03-695297-7.

== See also ==
- List of TED speakers
