= Anne Madden (biologist) =

American biologist and science communicator

Anne Arnold Madden is an American biologist, inventor, and science communicator who advocates for finding "microbial solutions to human problems."

Madden’s research on microscopic life is often featured in the press, particularly her studies on the microbial community of food, using advanced DNA techniques to create the first atlas of arthropods in USA homes, investigating the microscopic life in dust, and using insect yeasts for ethanol production and beer brewing.

Her research on insect-associated microorganisms led to a patent application on the use of the yeast Lachancea thermotolerans for beer brewing and the first commercialization of primary souring yeasts for making sour beer. She first isolated the yeast from wasps and bumblebees. This technology formed the basis of the biotechnology company Lachancea LLC.

Madden discovered and named the species Mucor nidicola, a fungus that lives inside the nests of wasps. Madden presented at the TED2017 conference in Vancouver, BC. She has also presented at other TED events such as TEDxCharlotte and TEDxGateway. She was featured in the award-winning science documentary film "The Kingdom: How Fungi Made Our World."

She is the founder of The Microbe Institute, an interdisciplinary resource for microbial discovery with a focus on education, art and discovery. The Microbe Institute also features a fellowship program that supports individuals in pursuing short (typically < 6 month) interdisciplinary projects related to microbes.

She has some of the most famous hair in science, as the Luxuriant Flowing Hair Club for Scientists—a group associated with the Ig Nobel Award—named her woman of the year in 2015.

== Selected publications ==
- The Microscopic Alchemist. PrimerStories.
- The ecology of insect-yeast relationships and its relevance to human industry. Proceedings of the Royal Society B. (2018) 285(1875)
- The diversity of arthropods in homes across the United States as determined by environmental DNA analyses. Molecular Ecology (2016). 25(24): 6214-6224. doi: 10.1111/mec.13900
- The emerging contribution of social wasps to grape rot disease ecology. PeerJ. (2017) 5:e3223; DOI 10.7717/peerj.3223
- Microbes should be central to ecological education and outreach. Journal of Microbiology and Biology Education.
- Actinomycetes with antimicrobial activity isolated from paper wasp nests. Environmental Entomology. (2013) 42(2): 703-710.
- Mucor nidicola sp. nov., a novel fungal species isolated from an invasive paper wasp nest. International Journal of Systematic and Evolutionary Microbiology.(2012) 62(7): 1710-1714. (*Cover)
- First detailed report of brood parasitoidism in the invasive population of the paper wasp Polistes dominulus (Hymenoptera, Vespidae) in North America. (2010) Insectes Sociaux. 57(3): 257-260.
- Sex-related differences in alkaloid chemical defenses of the dendrobatid frog Oophaga pumilio from Cayo Nancy, Bocas del Toro, Panama. (2009) Journal of Natural Products. 73(3): 317-321.
- Neocitreamicins I and II, novel antibiotics with activity against methicillin resistant Staphylococcus aureus and vancomycin-resistant Enterococci. (2008) Journal of Antibiotics. 61(7):457-463. (*Cover)
