= Sunni Brown =

American author in Austin, Texas

Sunni Brown is an American author in Austin, Texas known for her marketing of doodling. She is the founder Sunni Brown Ink, a visual thinking consultancy.

She is a co-author of Gamestorming: A Playbook for Innovators, Rulebreakers and Changemakers a book that outlines visual thinking techniques for business. She is also the instigator of The Doodle Revolution and author of a book called The Doodle Revolution: Unlock the Power to Think Differently.

Sunni and was named one of Fast Company’s Most Creative People in Business and Most Creative People on Twitter 2011.
