= Mateo Salvatto =

Argentinian entrepreneur (born 1999)

Mateo Nicolás Salvatto
- Born: January 10, 1999 (age 27); Buenos Aires, Argentina
- Education: ORT Argentina
- Occupations: Entrepreneur and speaker
- Known for: CEO and founder of Asteroid Technologies
- Notable work: Háblalo app

Mateo Nicolás Salvatto (born January 10, 1999) is an Argentine technology entrepreneur specialized in robotics, founder of Asteroid Technologies and creator of the app Háblalo, which eases communication for people with speech and talk difficulties.

He is co-author of the books La Batalla del Futuro: Algo en qué creer (The Battle of the Future: Something to believe in) and País de Mierda: Ideas y Reflexiones sobre el Mejor País del Mundo (Country of Shit: Ideas and Reflections on the Best Country in the World).

== Career ==
=== Asteroid Technologies and Háblalo ===
Mateo Salvatto studied electronics in high school and became a Systems analyst at the ORT Technological Institute of Argentina.

Salvatto developed the Háblalo app at the age of 18, which assists people who suffer from communication difficulties, such as deafness, hearing loss, cerebral palsy, amyotrophic lateral sclerosis, autism spectrum disorder, aphasias, among others.

In 2018 Mateo Salvatto co-founded and became CEO of Asteroid Technologies, a company that develops free technology for people in vulnerable situations and with disabilities.

Since 2019 he serves as Head of Innovation at ORT Technical Schools of Argentina and since 2020 he holds that same position at Nawaiam, a video game company.

=== Other projects ===
Mateo Salvatto is also a speaker, having given lectures in cities of Argentina and other countries, including TEDxRíodelaPlata, the 11th Bali Democracy Forum in Indonesia, the IDEA colloquium in Argentina, the Yenching Social Innovation Forum in China and the Global Conference on Educational Robotics in Oklahoma, United States, among others.

In 2021 he joined as a columnist the radio show "Diego a la tarde", hosted by journalist Diego Leuco on Radio Mitre, where he started his podcast "10 Minutos para Cambiar el Mundo (“10 Minutes to Change the World"). That same year he published, along with his brother Augusto Salvatto, the book La Batalla del Futuro: Algo en qué creer (The Battle of the Future: Something to believe in). In 2023, both brothers published their second book, País de Mierda: Ideas y Reflexiones sobre el Mejor País del Mundo (Country of Shit: Ideas and Reflections on the Best Country in the World).

== Awards and honours ==
In 2016 he was nominated along with other entrepreneurs for the Entrepreneur of the Year award given by the United States embassy in Argentina.

In 2018 he received the Humanitarian Innovator of the Year award from the Massachusetts Institute of Technology (MIT) and the Pekin University awarded him with the Best Social Innovator Worldwide award. The National Congress of Argentina declared him "Outstanding Entrepreneur" and Ernst & Young named him Social Entrepreneur of the Year.

In 2019 he received the Premio Perfil a la Inteligencia in the Digital Innovation category and was recognized as one of the Ten Outstanding Young People (TOYP) of Argentina by the Argentine Chamber of Commerce and Services (CAC) and the Junior Chamber International (JCI).

In 2017 the Háblalo application won the national application competition organized by the National Communications Agency of Argentina (ENACOM) and Scholas Occurrentes.

The Hearlo application (formerly known as Háblalo) was also distinguished by the Congress of Argentina and the Legislature of the City of Buenos Aires, which declared it "of social interest". It was also chosen as the Best Social Innovation in China and it appeared in Google's documentary "IMakeApps".

In 2020 Asteroid Technologies was recognized as one of the Top 100 Global Startups by the Global Entrepreneurship Network in Saudi Arabia, after Háblalo represented Argentina in the Entrepreneurship World Cup (EWC).

In 2023 Salvatto was recognized by the British organization One Young World as one of the global entrepreneurs of the year.
