= Shukla Bose =

Indian businesswoman & Philanthropist

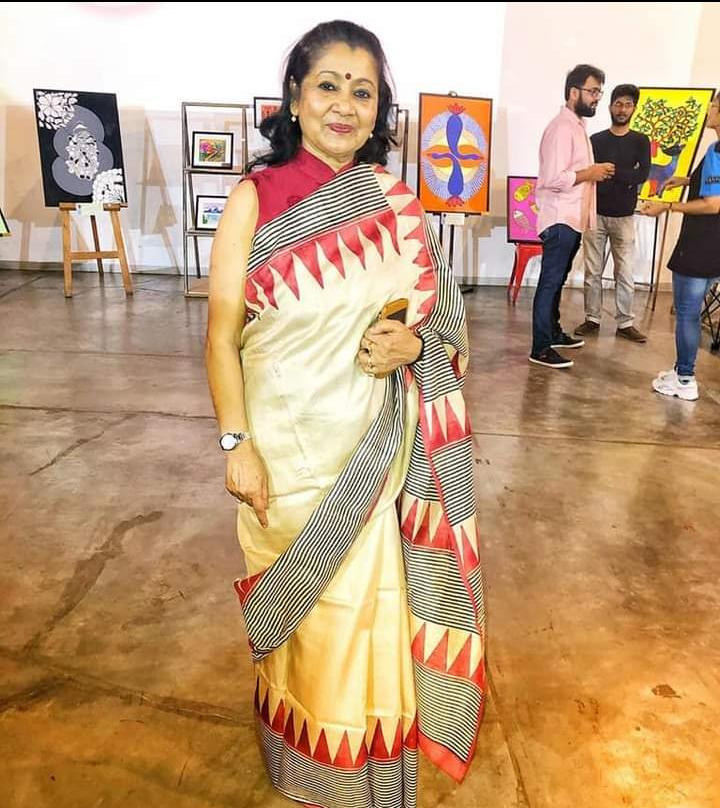
- Born: Darjeeling, West Bengal, India
- Education: Loreto College, Kolkata
- Occupations: Founder and CEO of Parikrma Humanity Foundation

Shukla Bose is the founder and CEO of the Parikrma Humanity Foundation, a nonprofit organization that runs English-medium schools for under-privileged children in Bangalore, India. She volunteered with Mother Teresa at Missionaries of Charity for 7 years.

== Career ==
Shukla began her career as a teacher in a convent school in Kolkata, and she later moved on to work at an army school in Bhutan.

She then worked with the Oberoi Group, and afterwards as the managing director of Resort Condominiums India (RCI (company)). However, as she approached her mid-30s, she began to question what impact she could make in life. She admits, "by 1997, I was doing something bizarre, looking at obits and writing my own too, trying to understand from other people’s lives what leaves behind an impact."

In 2000, she accepted an offer to run a multinational NGO for children, and started their Indian operations. Within two years of applying her leadership and institution-building skills there, she felt inspired to start an NGO of her own.

Shukla Bose spent 26 years in the hospitality industry before giving up her CEO position to begin Parikrma in 2003. Simon Winchester, then a correspondent for The Guardian, recalled: Shukla "was [in 1971] a guest-relations assistant at [ Grand Hotel (Kolkata) ]. She became something of a den mother to us rather bewildered group of outsiders [foreign correspondents], helping us with all manner of the minor problems that anyone travelling in India [in 1971] would inevitably encounter."
