= Pete Cashmore =

Scottish businessman (born 1985)

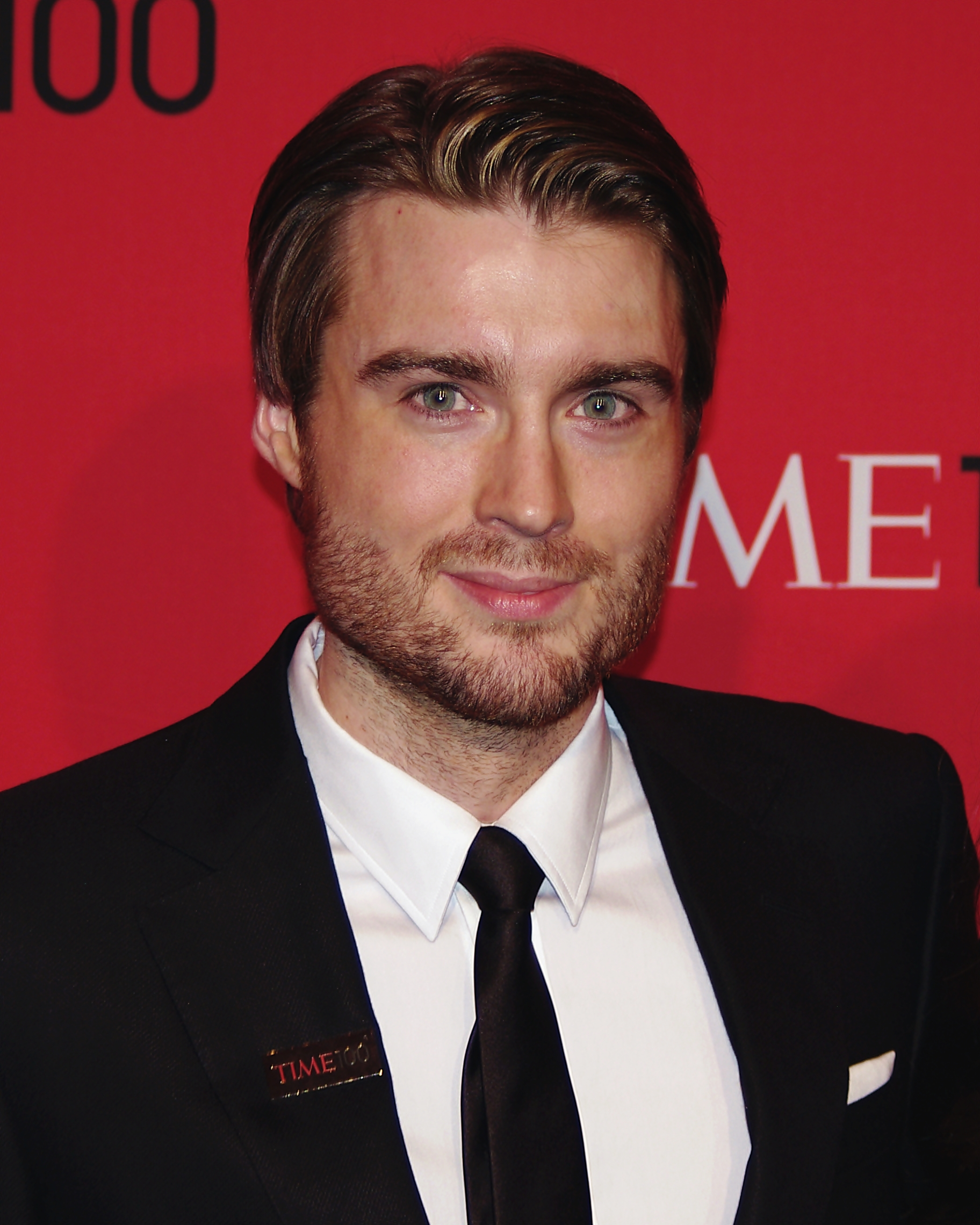
- Cashmore at the 2012 Time 100 gala
- Born: 18 September 1985 (age 41); Banchory, Scotland
- Website: Masterverse.io

Pete Cashmore (born 18 September 1985) is the founder and former CEO of the media and entertainment company Mashable, He grew up in Banchory, Aberdeenshire, Scotland, and founded Mashable in Aberdeenshire in 2005 when he was 19.

== Biography ==
In 2009, Cashmore was recognized in Inc.'s "30 Under 30", Forbes' "Top 25 Web Celebs", and The Huffington Post's "Top 10 Game Changers 2009".

In 2011, Cashmore was chosen as World Economic Forum 2011 Young Global Leader

Cashmore previously wrote a weekly column on technology and social media for CNN. In 2012, Cashmore made Time magazine's list of the 100 most influential people.

In 2017, Mashable was sold to Ziff Davis for 50 million dollars, and over 50 staff members were laid off.

In November 2018, after his social media profiles were edited to include "Now: Taking some time off and working on something new," it was announced that Cashmore would be leaving Mashable at the end of the year. The general manager of Ziff Davis Tech (Mashable's parent company), Mike Finnerty, confirmed this.

== Personal life ==
He is based in Los Angeles Metropolitan Area.
