= Manuel Lima =

Portuguese designer and author (born 1978)

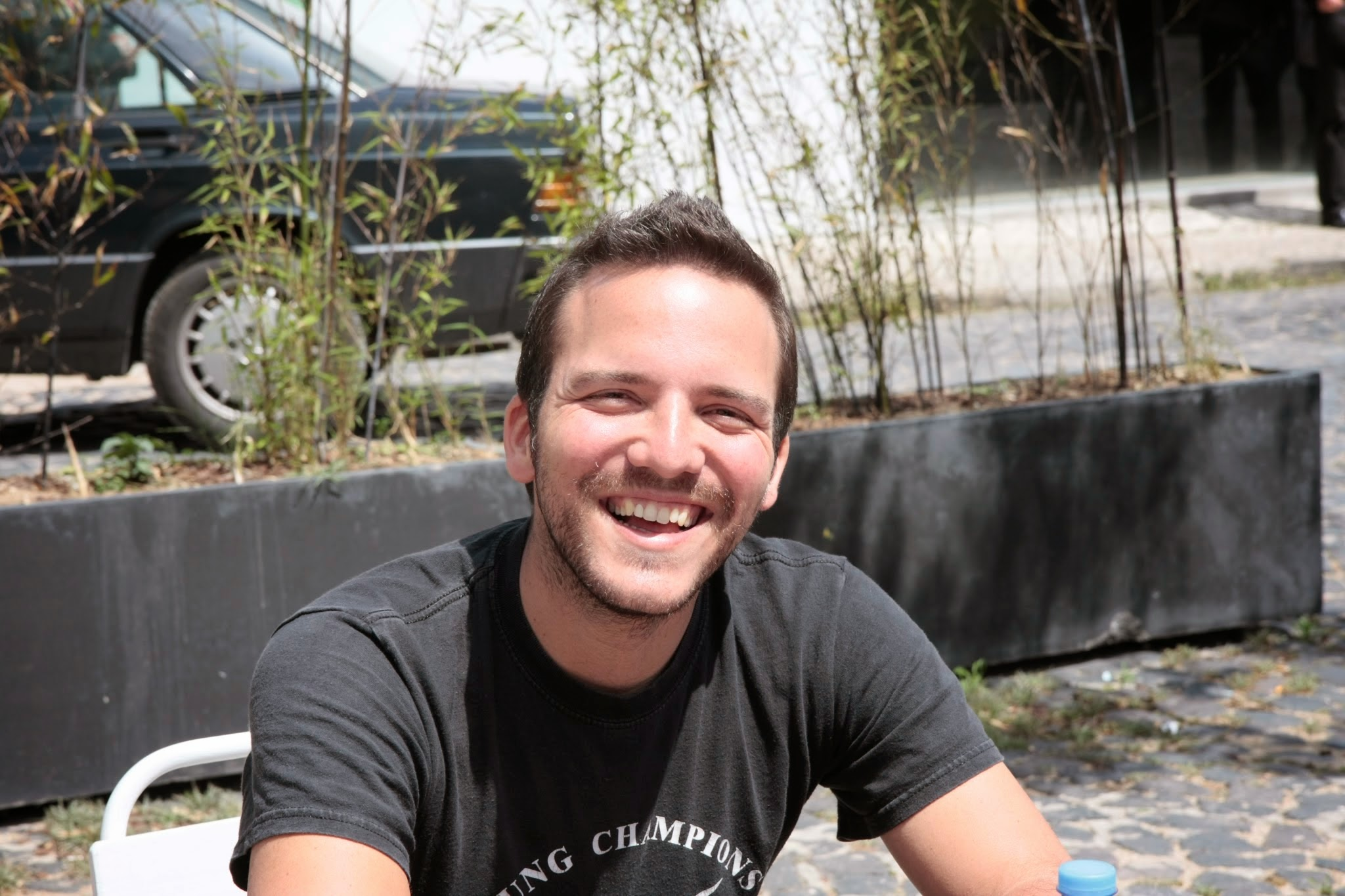
- Lima in 2008
- Born: May 3, 1978 (age 48); Ponta Delgada, Portugal
- Citizenship: Portuguese; American
- Education: Parsons School of Design
- Occupations: Designer, lecturer, advisor, author.
- Known for: Visual culture, design, information visualization, graph drawing, tree structure.

Manuel Lima (born May 3, 1978) is a Portuguese designer, author, and lecturer known for his work in information visualization and visual culture. He is the author of four books translated into several languages and resides in Lisbon with his wife and two daughters.

== Education and career ==
Lima grew up on São Miguel Island in the Azores, Portugal.

In 1996, at the age of eighteen, he moved to Lisbon to pursue a BFA degree in Industrial Design from the Faculty of Architecture at Technical University of Lisbon. After an internship in Copenhagen, Denmark, at the design studio Kontrapunkt, Lima went on to study at Parsons School of Design in New York City, where he received an MFA in Design and Technology in 2005. Lima said that a lecture from his Parsons teacher Christopher Kirwan in 2004 was the moment that drove him towards information design. His thesis "Blogviz: Mapping the dynamics of Information Diffusion in Blogspace" was subsequently published by Omniscriptum Publishing in 2009. During his MFA program, Lima worked for Siemens Corporate Research Center, the American Museum of Moving Image, and Parsons Institute for Information Mapping (PIIM).

It was during his time at PIIM, that Lima consolidated his research in information visualization and complex networks leading to the creation in October 2005 of VisualComplexity.com, an online archive for network visualization. Following his MFA, Lima worked as a designer and manager for an advertising agency R/GA, mobile phone maker Nokia, Microsoft Bing, and Codecademy. He currently works for Google as a Design Lead and Startup Mentor.

== Work ==
=== Networkism ===
In his first book Visual Complexity: Mapping Patterns of Information (2011), Lima covers the growing popularity of the network construct, not just as a scientific pursuit but as a cultural meme. Lima introduces a new movement or "artistic trend" characterized by the depiction of metaphorical graph structures, which he labels "Networkism". As Lima explains:

Networkism is stimulated by rhizomatic properties like nonlinearity, multiplicity, or interconnectedness, and scientific advances in areas such as genetics, neuroscience, physics, molecular biology, computer systems, and sociology. As a direct consequence of the recent outburst of network visualization, networkism is equally motivated by the unveiling of new knowledge domains as well as the visual representation of complex systems.

=== Proclivity for circles ===
In the Introduction of The Book of Circles: Visualizing Spheres of Knowledge (2017), Lima provides an evolutionary explanation for our propensity towards circular shapes. His account comprises three hypotheses:

==== 1. Humans prefer curves ====
Lima mentions that from an early age babies show an innate preference for curves, a human tendency corroborated by different studies, including a seminal paper published in 2006 by cognitive psychologists Moshe Bar and Maital Neta, which revealed a strong human preference for curved objects and typefaces, as well as a 2013 study by researchers at the University of Toronto at Scarborough, which found a similar inclination in architectural spaces.

==== 2. Circles equal happiness ====
In his second evolutionary explanation, Lima mentions the experiment conducted by psychologist John N. Bassili in 1978, where the faces of participants were painted black and subsequently covered in dozens of luminescent dots. Participants were then asked to express different emotions in order to better understand the visual contour of each sentiment. As Lima describes:

while expressions of anger showed acute downward V shapes (angled eyebrows, cheeks, and chin), expressions of happiness were conveyed by expansive, outward curved patterns (arched cheeks, eyes, and mouth). In other words, happy faces resembled an expansive circle, while angry faces resembled a downward triangle.

==== 3. Spherical geometry of the eye ====
In his third point, Lima hypothesizes on how the circular framing and spherical geometry of our visual field, which cause a distortion similar to a "fish-eye lens" or a "crystal ball", could further "reinforce our innate tendency toward all things circular". "Perhaps the brain prefers forms and contours that have a better fit within such a conditioned field of view." says Lima.

In his fourth book, The New Designer: Rejecting Myths, Embracing Change (2023), published by MIT Press, Lima shifts focus from data visualization to the broader practice and responsibilities of design. The book is organized around a series of widely held assumptions about the design profession, which Lima describes as "myths", including the ideas that design is fundamentally a pursuit of perfection and that design exists solely in service of human users.

== Critical reception ==
Stephen Few, a prominent figure in data visualization, reviewed Lima's Visual Complexity: Mapping Patterns of Information in 2009. While acknowledging Lima's "impressive" breadth of knowledge spanning multiple fields, Few critiqued the book for lacking practical guidance, noting that "network visualizations are notoriously difficult to fathom" and that the book "makes no attempt to describe their various strengths, weaknesses, or appropriate uses." Few concluded that those seeking "a comprehensive, accessible, and practical guide to network visualization must prolong the wait."

Conversely, a review of Lima's later books The Book of Trees and The Book of Circles praised their historical scope and taxonomic organization, noting that "seeing a diagram from a hand-scribed manuscript next to an AI-generated image reinforces trees and circles as archetypes for structuring information."

== Recognition ==
Lima has been described by Wired as "the man who turns data into art" and by Creativity magazine as "the Edward Tufte of the 21st Century." He was nominated by Creativity magazine as "one of the 50 most creative and influential minds of 2009" and was elected a Fellow of the Royal Society of Arts (FRSA) in 2010. He received the Innovative Entrepreneurship Award in the Portuguese Diaspora (Prémio Empreendedorismo Inovador na Diáspora Portuguesa) from the Portuguese President and was elected curator for the Portuguese delegation at the London Design Biennale 2016.

== Publications ==
- Lima, Manuel. The New Designer: Rejecting Myths, Embracing Change. MIT Press, 2023. ISBN 978-0-262-04763-0
- Lima, Manuel. The Book of Circles: Visualizing Spheres of Knowledge; Princeton Architectural Press, 2017. ISBN 978-1-61689-528-0
- Lima, Manuel. The Book of Trees: Visualizing Branches of Knowledge; Princeton Architectural Press, 2014. ISBN 978-1-616-89218-0
- Lima, Manuel. Visual Complexity: Mapping Patterns of Information; Princeton Architectural Press, 2011. ISBN 978-1-568-98936-5
- Lima, Manuel. Blogviz: Mapping the dynamics of Information Diffusion in Blogspace; Omniscriptum Publishing, 2009. ISBN 978-3-639-20902-0
