= Jeshurun Vincent =

Traveling musician, inspirational speaker, and author

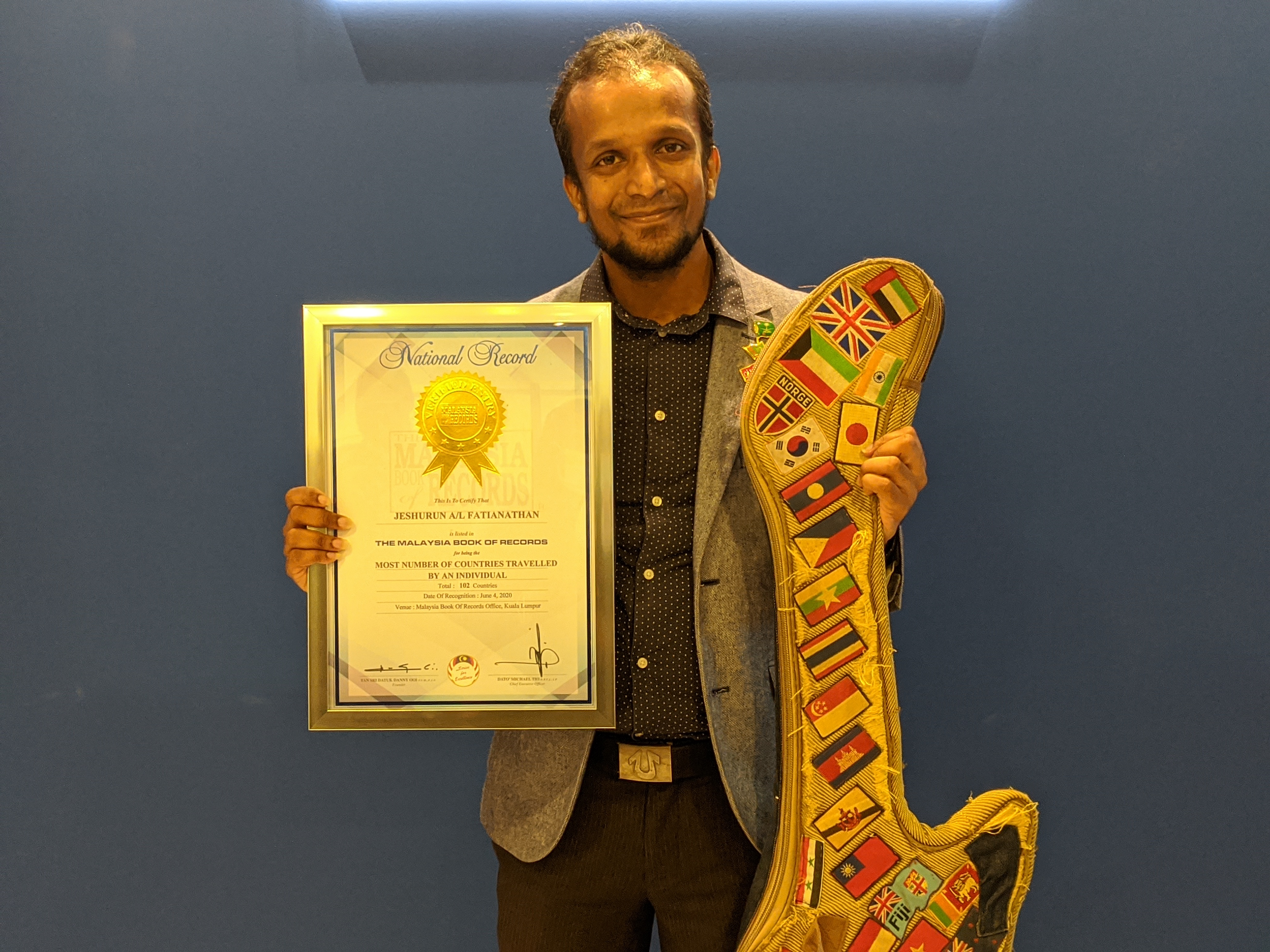
- Jeshurun Vincent was awarded Malaysia Book of Records
- Education: Universiti Malaysia Sabah
- Occupations: Musician, author, inspirational speaker, motivation speaker
- Known for: Global musical journey, Malaysia Book of Records holder
- Notable work: Into the Potter's Hands, SEAT 39F

Jeshurun Vincent (born 5 November 1987) is a Malaysian traveling musician, author, and inspirational speaker who gained recognition for his global musical journey despite being partially deaf; he was raised in Kajang, Malaysia.

== Early life and education ==
Jeshurun was born as Jeshurun Fatianathan on 5 November 1987 in Petaling Jaya, Selangor. Jeshurun's early musical experiences began in school where, like many Malaysian students, he was required to learn the flute (perhaps better known as the recorder). By his own admission, he struggled with the instrument, once stating, "I was so bad at it that teachers used to hit me with the flute. It was very painful and I began disliking that instrument."

At age 14 Jeshurun was initially deemed "too small" for music by a local music school. After four years, he was finally enrolled and chose the bass guitar as his instrument, despite it being equal to his height at the time.

== Hearing impairment ==
At the age of 19 Jeshurun's life changed dramatically when he woke up one day partially deafened due to an aggressive virus that damaged most of his hearing. This condition posed a significant challenge to his musical aspirations but ultimately became part of his inspirational story.

== Career ==
=== Music and global travels ===
Jeshurun began his international travels as a musician in August 2014, initially visiting countries in Asia before expanding to other continents. He typically performs instrumental music rather than vocals, finding it to be a universal language that requires no translation and allows him to connect with audiences across language barriers.

By June 2020, Jeshurun had set a record in The Malaysia Book of Records for visiting 102 countries as a solo Malaysian traveler. He was also invited to speak at TEDx in one of the online conference. By December 2022, he had expanded his journey to 123 countries across all continents. During his travels, Jeshurun collects flags from each nation he visits and sews them onto his guitar case as mementos. He has visited 155 countries across the 7 continents.

Jeshurun's approach to travel follows three principles:

- Never ask anyone for money
- Never create sympathy by showing a "sad" face
- Travel with whatever amount of cash he has at that time enough

=== FIFA World Cup 2022 performance ===
In December 2022 Jeshurun performed at the FIFA World Cup in Qatar as part of the FIFA Fan Festival in Doha, Qatar. He performed in a place that had previously hosted many international artists.

During his performance Jeshurun proudly displayed the Malaysian flag while playing songs on his electrical guitar. His repertoire included his most of his instrumental composition and World Cup cover songs instrumental version such as "Hayya Hayya (Better Together)".

=== Cultural ambassador for Malaysia ===
Jeshurun has played a significant role in sharing Malaysian culture and tourism through his international travels, performances and also he carries the Jalur Gemilang with him. In 2022, he collaborated with the Embassy of Malaysia in Madrid an after that Budapest (2023) to promote Malaysia through his music and travel experiences. During his visit to Hungary, he shared his experiences of visiting over 130 countries and performed Malaysian songs, helping to showcase Malaysian culture and tourism to the Hungarian audience. In 2024, he visited Ireland after that he also visited Brunei, where he was invited by the Embassy of Malaysia in Brunei to share his experience and present Malaysian culture too. He also visited a number of African nations this 2025 such as Comoros, South Africa and many more.

=== Charitable work and community service ===
A significant aspect of Jeshurun's charitable work involves organizing and participating in football matches for various causes. In early 2024, he played a pivotal role in BIC FC's international charity match in Singapore, an initiative focused on combating food poverty together with a NGO called Gift of Love (GOL). The event was notably officiated by Dato' Dr. Azfar Mohamad Mustafar, the Malaysian Ambassador to Singapore, highlighting the diplomatic significance of the occasion. Prior to the match, Jeshurun, alongside his team, demonstrated their commitment to community service by visiting an orphanage in Johor, where they engaged in activities with the children. As team captain, he led BIC FC in a competitive match that ended in a 4–2 defeat, though the result was secondary to the event's primary goal of raising awareness about food poverty and fostering Malaysia-Singapore bilateral relations through sports. The initiative exemplified Jeshurun's approach to combining athletics with social causes, using sports as a platform for community building and charitable work.

=== CFOURJ and musical career ===
Jeshurun is founder, main vocalist of the music band CFOURJ, with whom he performed and participated in various media appearances and has few music albums. His association with CFOURJ included interviews on platforms such as Astro V'buzz with Daryl Baptist and Rueben Thevandran.

=== Published works ===
In 2017, Jeshurun published his first book titled "Into the Potter's Hands". He has also produced a mini-series which describes overcoming physical and emotional adversity through faith. November 2025, he launched his second book called SEAT 39F, and it's about his travelling experiences, tips and people.

== Recognition and awards ==
- The Malaysia Book of Records holder for visiting 102 countries as a solo Malaysian traveler (2020)
- Torch bearer for the Kuala Lumpur 2017 SEA Games
- 'Unsung Heroes' category winner at the Malaysian Indian Cine Awards (2019)

== Personal life ==
Jeshurun believes in God, which he credits as a source of strength in overcoming his hearing impairment and other life challenges. He experience personal loss when his mother, whom he described as his "biggest fan," died shortly before the COVID-19 lockdowns began in Malaysia.
