= Maya Penn =

American fashion designer

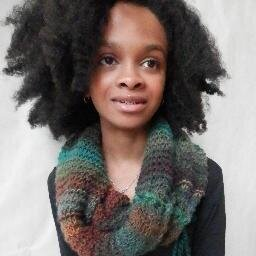
- Born: February 10, 2000 (age 26); Atlanta, Georgia, U.S.
- Occupations: Entrepreneur, animator
- Years active: 2008–present
- Known for: Entrepreneurship,
- Website: https://mayasideas.com/

Maya Penn (born February 10, 2000) is an American entrepreneur, philanthropist, animator, artist, and the CEO of her eco-friendly fashion company Maya's Ideas.

Penn was born and raised in Atlanta. She started Maya’s Ideas in 2008 at the age of 8. She spoke at the TEDWomen event in San Francisco, which was streamed live on TED.com. She has done 2 official TEDTalks and 1 TEDxTalk. Penn is also an animator and artist, drawing cartoon characters from an early age. She is the creator of an animated series called The Pollinators which focuses on the importance of bees and other pollinators. She premiered a clip of The Pollinators and another animated series called Malicious Dishes at TEDWomen 2013. In 2025, she released her first film Asali: Power of The Pollinators which is an animated action-adventure short. It was nominated in the 57th NAACP Image Awards for outstanding-short form (animated).

Penn is a supporter and member of One Billion Rising and Girls, Inc. In 2011, she founded her own nonprofit organization, Maya's Ideas 4 The Planet. Penn was named to Oprah's SuperSoul 100 list of visionaries and influential leaders in 2016.

Maya has also been featured in various magazines, podcasts, TV and radio programmes, and guest edited the 17th Edition of Eluxe Magazine, which focused on sustainability and Generation Z.
