= Catherine Crump =

American law professor (born 1978)

- Born: 1978 (age 47–48)
- Education: Stanford University (BA); Stanford Law School (JD)
- Occupations: Lawyer, law school professor
- Known for: Advocacy of privacy rights

Catherine Crump (born 1978) is an American law professor and civil liberties expert focused on the effects of digital surveillance technology on privacy and free speech. She is the Director of the Samuelson Law, Technology and Public Policy Clinic, Co-Director of Berkeley Center for Law and Technology, and a Clinical Professor of Law at the UC Berkeley School of Law. Crump's expertise on digital data collection and the law is regularly featured in the media. In 2023, Crump served as a senior policy advisor for criminal justice for the White House Domestic Policy Council.

== Career ==
Crump served as a staff attorney for the American Civil Liberties Union and is currently a law professor and director of the Samuelson Law, Technology and Public Policy Clinic at the University of California, Berkeley. The Berkeley clinic gives Berkeley Law students hands-on experience at the intersection of technology and law such as a project on the California criminal justice system's use of electronic surveillance bracelets on juveniles.

Throughout her career, Crump has been a staunch and consistent advocate for privacy. She has criticized the FAA for focusing exclusively on safety issues regarding drone aircraft and not addressing possible privacy issues such as whether the craft could be misused for spying and data gathering. She criticized the use of cameras to read license plates and subsequently build databases on the "movements of millions of Americans over months or even years". She has argued that Congress should prohibit the misuse by law enforcement officers of cell phone and GPS technology to collect private information on innocent people without first getting a warrant. She criticized the policy of border patrol agents to detain travelers and examine the contents of their laptop computers and cell phones "without suspecting the traveler of wrongdoing". She believes government should target surveillance based on "those suspected of wrongdoing" and refrain from building giant databases of the movements of innocent citizens.
