= Nabuur =

Netherlands-based global aid nonprofit

The Nabuur Foundation is a non-profit organization based in Giethoorn, Netherlands. It aims to help in the development of impoverished communities by enabling people from other countries to help the community members through Nabuur's website.

Nabuur started operating on 30 October 2001. Its founder, Siegfried Woldhek, is a former director of the Dutch branch of the World Wildlife Fund. Nabuur is an old word in Dutch meaning "neighbor".

== Nabuur system ==
The core of the system employed by Nabuur is the concept of village. There is a simple mechanism at the website for registering a village. Communities in all parts of the world can register in Nabuur's website and state the issues they face. Such issues might be Aids epidemics, low literacy rates, the construction of water wells, gender inequalities among others.

From that moment on this community is called a village, in spite of the community's current geographical status. Some are as few as 50 people, some as many as a million. Then a facilitator (a volunteer worker trained by Nabuur) is appointed for this village's web page.

Now other users can sign in as virtual neighbors for this village. The neighbors will look for possible ideas concerning the issues raised by the village, and then present possible ideas for the community to consider. If project funding or expert involvement is to be sought, that is for the local community to do—with support from the virtual neighbors.
