= Jennifer Lin =

Jennifer Lin (born 1989 in California) is an American Music Director, pianist, and Composer. She was a student of the Yamaha Music Education System (YMES), the Junior Original Concert program, and University of California, Los Angeles.

She found her major introduction to the public at large when a recording of her inspirational improv performance at the TED conference in Oldsmar, Florida, on February 27, 2004, was posted on TED.com in August 2006. She was 14 years old at the time.

She has performed for Oprah and The Daily Show, among others. On The Oprah Winfrey Show, she composed a piece on the spot with five random music notes that Oprah chose.
