= Eva Vertes =

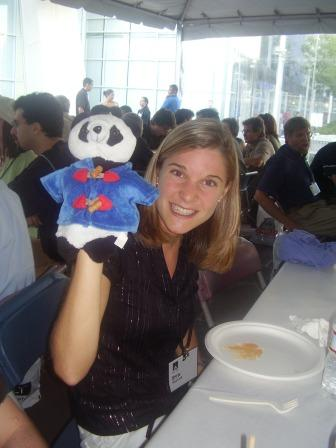
- Vertes in 2006
- Born: 1985 (age 40–41)
- Known for: Alzheimer's and cancer research

Eva Vertes George (born 1985) is a Canadian Alzheimer's and cancer researcher and a resident physician in pathology at the University of Florida College of Medicine, where she earned an M.D. degree after attending Princeton University as an undergraduate. She was recognized for her research when she was still a teenager. At 17, she discovered properties of a chemical compound (RPI-069) which stopped the brain cells of fruit flies from dying, considered a step towards curing Alzheimer's. She won first prize at BASEF and the Intel International Science and Engineering Fair in Kentucky, and then finished her high school diploma by correspondence while continuing her research in Italy for a year, under a fellowship she was awarded. She is also recognized for her research which found a correlation between stem cells and brain cancer. This finding is the basis of her argument that cancer itself is the body's natural self-repair system in error. She is perhaps most visible due to her being on a PBS series on scientists, and speaking at the TED convention.

== See also ==
- TED
- Stem cells
- Cancer
- Alzheimer's disease
