= Jon Levy (behavioral scientist) =

American behaviorist and author

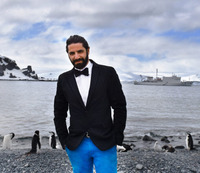
- Jon Levy in Antarctica, 2022
- Born: 45–46
- Occupation: Author
- Website: www.JonLevy.com

Jonathan Levy is an American behavioral scientist, social networker and author. Levy is known for having formed a series of dinner parties known as the Influencer's Dinner, to encourage influencers from various industries to interact.

== Career ==
Levy's writing primarily focuses on what affects decision making. He works out of C Lab collaborating with neuroscientist Moran Cerf, of the Kellogg School of Management.

Levy researched the behavior of people at every level of influence, in order to better understand what causes them to engage and connect. He researched dating statistics from the dating app Hinge to discover what leads people to take their online connections and move them into in person relationships.

He created dinner parties known as Influencers Dinners and Inspired Culture: The Salon to gather influencers from various industries.

Levy spoke at TED and Fortune's Brainstorm Health.

Levy's The 2 AM Principle: Discover the Science of Adventure was published in 2016 by Regan Arts and distributed by Simon & Schuster. The book was mentioned by GQ, Vogue, and Elle.

In 2021, Levy released his second book, “You’re Invited: The Art and Science of Cultivating Influence”.

== Personal life ==
Between 2014 and 2015, Levy was recognized as one of "New York City's Most Successful Bachelors" by Gotham Magazine and one of the "41 Most Eligible Bachelors" in America by Elle Magazine.
