= MIT Department of Brain and Cognitive Sciences =

Research Department

Coordinates: 42.362337°N 71.091753°W

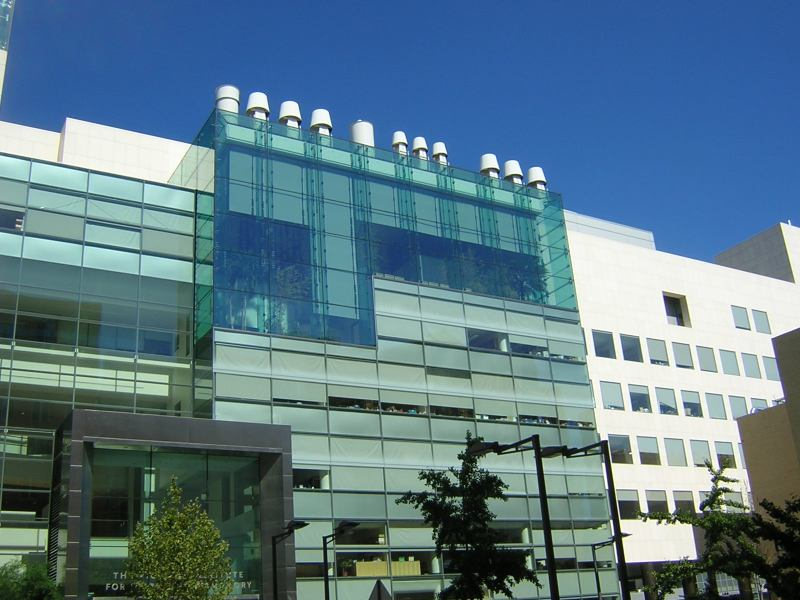
MIT Building 46, the Department of Brain and Cognitive Sciences

The Department of Brain and Cognitive Sciences at the Massachusetts Institute of Technology (MIT), in Cambridge, Massachusetts, United States, engages in fundamental research in the areas of brain and neural systems, and cognitive processes. The department is within the School of Science at MIT and was initially founded as the Department of Psychology by the psychologist Hans-Lukas Teuber in 1964. The department formed in 1986 to integrate psychology and neuroscience research, via merger of the Department of Psychology with the neuroscience-oriented elements of the MIT Whitaker College of Health Sciences, Technology, and Management.

== Research ==
The department aims to understand the basic processes of intelligence and the brain. It has four main themes of research:

Molecular and cellular neuroscience
This deals with the biology of neurons and cellular physiology.
Systems neuroscience
This deals with developing models of cognitive processes at the neural level. This includes developing algorithms and mathematical models of neural activity.
Cognitive science
This engages in the research of mind through the interdisciplinary approaches of psychology, computer science, mathematics, and linguistics for the experimental analysis and mathematical modeling of cognitive processes. The Department of Brain and Cognitive Sciences works in collaboration with the McGovern Institute and the Picower Institute, also at the MIT.
Computation
This deals with the development of theoretical models that explain the processes of memory, language and reasoning using computer simulations and computational models.

The Department of Brain and Cognitive Sciences works in close collaboration with the Artificial Intelligence Laboratory and the Computer Science department and the Center for Biological and Computational Learning at MIT.

== Notable researchers ==
- Emilio Bizzi - Neuroscience
- Suzanne Corkin - Neuro-psychology
- Roland William Fleming - Experimental psychology
- Steven Pinker - Cognitive psychology
- Tomaso Poggio - Mathematical cognitive science
- Rebecca Saxe - Psychology
- Joshua Tenenbaum - Mathematical cognitive psychology
- Ann Graybiel - Neuroscience
- Nancy Kanwisher - Cognitive neuroscience
- Evelina Fedorenko - Cognitive neuroscience
- Susan Carey - Developmental psychology

== See also ==
- McGovern Institute
- Picower Institute
