= Robert Desimone =

American neuroscientist

- Education: Macalester College; Princeton University
- Scientific career
- Workplaces: McGovern Institute for Brain Research at the Massachusetts Institute of Technology

Robert Desimone is an American neuroscientist who currently serves as the director of the McGovern Institute for Brain Research and the Doris and Don Berkey Professor of Neuroscience at the Massachusetts Institute of Technology.

The McGovern Institute, established by Patrick Joseph McGovern and Lore Harp McGovern focuses on conducting basic research on the mind and brain, as well as applying that knowledge to help those affected by brain disorders.

Before joining the McGovern Institute in 2004, Robert Desimone held the position of director of intramural research at the National Institute of Mental Health. He is a member of the US National Academy of Sciences and American Academy of Arts and Sciences and is known for his research on the brain mechanisms that underlie visual perception, attention, and executive control. At the McGovern Institute, Desimone works on promoting the development of systems neuroscience, novel neuroscience technologies, and the translation of basic research findings into new treatments that improve human health, including new approaches to brain disorders such as autism and schizophrenia.

From 2014 to 2019 and again in 2023-2024, Desimone appeared as an international judge and team leader on The Brain, a competition showing unique mental skills.

== Research ==
His early work, conducted during his Ph.D. at Princeton and his postdoctoral years at the National Institute of Mental Health, included the first published evidence that some neurons in the temporal cortex of primates respond exclusively to faces. While working at the National Institute of Mental Health (NIMH), he studied the physiological properties of neurons in extrastriate visual cortex, and together with Leslie Ungerleider, he mapped the topographic organization and anatomical connections of many new cortical visual areas. In collaboration with Earl Miller, he discovered a physiological basis for recency memory (repetition suppression) and working memory in inferior temporal cortex. He reported evidence for the role of attention in modulating the neuronal properties of areas in the ventral stream, and he and John Duncan proposed a biased competition theory to explain many aspects of attention control. With John Reynolds, he proposed a quantitative model of biased competition to explain the effects of attention on neurons, which is formally a normalization model. With Pascal Fries, he described the effects of attention on synchronized activity in extrastriate cortex, and he later found that synchronized activity between extrastriate cortex and prefrontal cortex is a mechanistic feature of selective attention

== Education ==
Desimone received his BA from Macalester College in 1974 and his Ph.D. from Princeton University in 1979.

== Personal life ==
Desimone is married and has two children.

== Awards ==
- Golden Brain Award, 1994;
- Troland Research Awards, 1990;
- Goldman-Rakic Prize, 2020
- Ralph Gerard Prize of the Society for Neuroscience, 2021;
