= Michael Herzog =

Michael Herzog may refer to:

- Michael Herzog (ice hockey) (1952–2011), Austrian ice hockey player
- Michael Herzog (neuroscientist) (born 1964), German neuroscientist
- Michael Herzog (ambassador), Israeli ambassador to the US, brother of the president of Israel, Isaac Herzog

== See also ==
- Michal Herzog, Israeli lawyer and wife of President of Israel, Isaac Herzog
- Mikel Herzog, Basque singer-songwriter
