= Evelina Fedorenko =

Cognitive neuroscientist

- Born: Volgograd, Russian SFSR, USSR
- Citizenship: United States
- Spouse: Ted Gibson
- Awards: K99/ R00 career development award

Academic background
- Education: Harvard University (BA); Massachusetts Institute of Technology (PhD)

Academic work
- Discipline: Neuroscientist
- Sub-discipline: Cognitive neuroscience
- Institutions: Harvard University; Massachusetts Institute of Technology; Massachusetts General Hospital

Evelina G. Fedorenko (born 1980) is a Russian-born American cognitive neuroscientist. She is a professor in the Department of Brain and Cognitive Sciences at the Massachusetts Institute of Technology and a member of the McGovern Institute for Brain Research. Her research focuses on the human language system, including how language is represented in the brain and how it differs from other cognitive systems.

== Early life and education ==
Born in 1980 in Volgograd in the Soviet Union, Fedorenko moved to the United States in 1998. In 2002, she graduated from Harvard University with a bachelor's degree in psychology and linguistics. She then went to the Massachusetts Institute of Technology (MIT) for her graduate degree in cognitive science and neuroscience, receiving her Ph.D. in 2007.

== Career and research ==
As of February 2024, Fedorenko is a tenured professor and laboratory head in the Brain and Cognitive Sciences department at MIT, a member of MIT's McGovern Institute for Brain Research, and was formerly an assistant professor at Harvard Medical School and a research affiliate at Massachusetts General Hospital.

Her specialty is the human language system. Her goal is to try to provide a representation of our brain regions and to study individuals who have healthy brain regions and who have brain disorders. She is also trying to understand the calculations that we perform in our everyday life. During her research she uses different kinds of methods including functional magnetic resonance imaging (fMRI), ERPs and intracranial recordings. One of her areas of research is the brains of polyglots, who speak multiple languages. This research has been featured in The New Yorker magazine and the BBC World Service documentary, The Polyglots.

== Awards ==
In 2007, she received the Pathway to Independence Award (K99/R00 career development award) from Eunice Kennedy Shriver National Institute of Child Health and Human Development (NICHD).

== Personal life ==
She is married to Ted Gibson, a cognitive scientist at MIT.
