= Tomaso Poggio =

Italian cognitive scientist (born 1947)

Tomaso A. Poggio
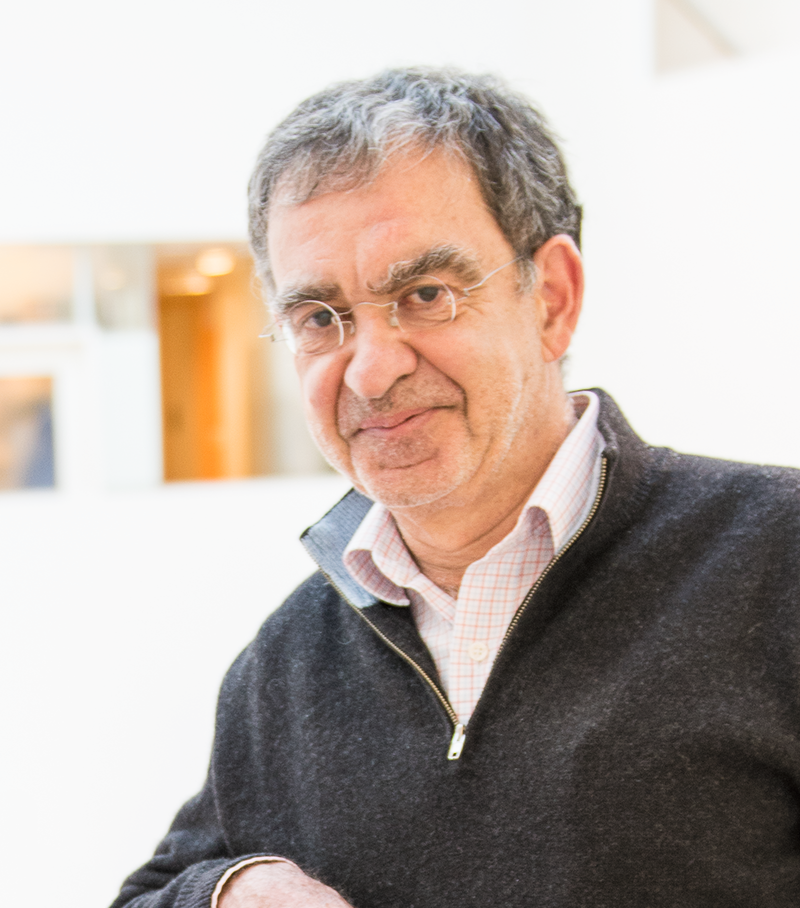
- Poggio in 2015
- Born: Tomaso Armando Poggio; 11 September 1947 (age 78); Genoa, Italy
- Education: Istituto Arecco (BA); University of Genoa (PhD)
- Known for: Biophysical and behavioral studies of the visual system; Computational analyses of vision and learning in humans and machines; Deep learning; Visuo-motor control system in the fly
- Awards: Otto Hahn Medal, 1979.; Honorary degree, University of Pavia, 2000.; 2003 Gabor Award.; 2009 Okawa Prize .; Swartz Prize For Theoretical and Computational Neuroscience,The Society for Neuroscience, 2014.
- Scientific career
- Fields: Machine learning; Neural networks; Artificial intelligence; Cognitive science; Visual systems
- Workplaces: Massachusetts Institute of Technology
- Doctoral advisor: Prof. A. Borsellino
- Notable students: Anya Hurlbert; Christof Koch; Partha Niyogi; Gabriel Kreiman

Tomaso Armando Poggio (born 11 September 1947 in Genoa, Italy) is the Eugene McDermott professor in the Department of Brain and Cognitive Sciences, an investigator at the McGovern Institute for Brain Research, a member of the MIT Computer Science and Artificial Intelligence Laboratory (CSAIL) and director of both the Center for Biological and Computational Learning at MIT and the Center for Brains, Minds, and Machines, a multi-institutional collaboration headquartered at the McGovern Institute since 2013.

== Biography ==
Born in Genoa, Italy, and educated at Istituto Arecco, Tomaso Poggio completed his doctorate in physics at the University of Genoa and received his degree in Theoretical Physics under professor A. Borsellino.

== Research ==
His interdisciplinary research on the problem of intelligence, between brains and computers, started at the Max Planck Institute in Tübingen, Germany in collaborations with Werner E. Reichardt, David C. Marr and Francis H.C. Crick, among others. He has made contributions to learning theory, to the computational theory of vision, to the understanding of the fly's visual system, and to the biophysics of computation. His recent work is focused on computational neuroscience in close collaboration with several physiology labs, trying to answer the questions of how our visual system learns to see and recognize scenes and objects.

He is one of the most cited computational neuroscientists. with contributions ranging from the biophysical and behavioral studies of the visual system to the computational analyses of vision and learning in humans and machines. With Werner E. Reichardt he characterized quantitatively the visuo-motor control system in the fly. With David Marr (neuroscientist), he introduced the seminal idea of levels of analysis in computational neuroscience. He and Torre introduced regularization as a mathematical framework to approach the ill-posed problems of vision and the key problem of learning from data. The citation for the 2009 Okawa prize mentions his "…outstanding contributions to the establishment of computational neuroscience, and pioneering researches ranging from the biophysical and behavioral studies of the visual system to the computational analysis of vision and learning in humans and machines." His research has always been interdisciplinary, between brains and computers. It is now focused on the mathematics of deep learning and on the computational neuroscience of the visual cortex.

== Industry ==
Poggio is a former Corporate Fellow of Thinking Machines Corporation and a former director of PHZ Capital Partners, Inc., is a director of Mobileye and was involved in starting, or investing in, several other high tech companies including Arris Pharmaceutical, nFX, Imagen, Digital Persona and DeepMind. Among his PhD students and post-docs are some of the today's leaders in the Science and in the Engineering of Intelligence, from Christof Koch (President and Chief Scientific Officer, Allen Institute) to Amnon Shashua (CEO and founder, Mobileye) and Demis Hassabis (CEO and founder, Deep Mind, and Nobel Prize for Chemistry 2024).

== Honors and awards ==
Poggio is an honorary member of the Neuroscience Research Program, a member of the American Academy of Arts and Sciences and a founding fellow of AAAI and a founding member of the McGovern Institute for Brain Research. He received the Laurea Honoris Causa in Computer Engineering from the University of Pavia for the Volta Bicentennial in 2000, the 2003 Gabor Award, the 2009 Okawa Prize , and named in 2009 a Fellow of the American Association for the Advancement of Science (AAAS) for "distinguished contributions to computational neuroscience, in particular, computational vision learning and regularization theory, biophysics of computation and models of recognition in the visual cortex", the 2014 Swartz Prize for Theoretical and Computational Neuroscience, in 2020 won the first edition of the international scientific award "Ratio et spes", the ICCV 2021 Helmholtz Prize, and the Kampe' de F'eriet Award and Plenary Lecture, IMPU 2022, Milan, Italy.

== Notable students ==
- Christof Koch, President and Chief Scientific Officer, Allen Institute for Brain Science
- Partha Niyogi

== See also ==
- Center for Brains, Minds, and Machines
- Center for Biological and Computational Learning at MIT.
