= Computerwoche =

German weekly newspaper

- Type: Weekly newspaper
- Format: 381 by 280 millimetres (15.0 in × 11.0 in)
- Publisher: International Data Group
- Editor-in-chief: Heinrich Vaske
- Launched: 9 October 1974; 51 years ago
- Language: German
- City: Munich
- Country: Germany
- Circulation: 28,306 (sold); 54,742 (distributed); (as of Q3 2005)
- Sister newspapers: Computerworld magazine
- ISSN: 0170-5121
- OCLC number: 60621167
- Website: Official website

Computerwoche (Computer Week) is a German weekly newspaper for CIOs and IT managers. The German counterpart of the American magazine Computerworld, it has been on the market since 1974, and is mainly sold by subscription. The newspaper belongs to the IT specialist publisher International Data Group (IDG), whose German branch and the editorial team of Computerwoche are based in Munich. The current editor-in-chief is Heinrich Vaske.

Computerwoche wants to present technical trends and the economic situation of manufacturers in such a way that IT managers, especially in medium-sized and large companies, can use it to plan their investments. There are also analyses, user reports, industry news, project reports, personnel details and current reports from the world of IT.

In 2009, the Computerwoche website was named the best online specialist medium in the IT/Telecommunications/Electronics category by the German Trade Press Association.

== International counterparts ==
The American magazine Computerworld first appeared in 1967. Over time, the publisher International Data Group founded branches with different publication formats in a total of 46 countries, some of which only appear digitally. The IDG website lists these print and digital media including their links.

== History ==
The first issue of Computerwoche appeared on Wednesday, October 9, 1974 with the subtitle The current weekly newspaper for the computer world. The editors and publisher, which was still called Computerworld GmbH at the time, needed three weeks to produce the second edition. From the third edition, which appeared two weeks later on November 13, there was a uniform structure that was retained over the next few years. The news, a topic of the week, an editorial (later a column), guest commentary and letters to the editor were followed by the respective categories of software, hardware, communications, IT careers and industry (later renamed business). The newspaper format was initially based on the look of daily newspapers at 445 × 315 millimeters. Until September 1989, a data tape reel and a globe were depicted on the upper left corner. From the fourth issue, which appeared on November 27, the specialist magazine was distributed weekly.

With issue 40/1975 there was a change to a smaller format of 390 × 268 millimeters. From now on, the layout of all pages, except for pages 5 to 7, had four columns, each 62 millimeters wide. Further small adjustments will follow later. About a year after the first edition was published, Computerwoche had an average of 60 pages. Printing was initially done using lead printing plates . From 1978 onwards, text capture devices from Linotype were available to the publisher . Editors had to write their texts on a ball-head machine, which was then typed and stored on verbatim tapes . From now on, the photo typesetting was done directly in-house. Employees glue the pages together according to the layout specifications, which were then checked up to four times before approval was given by the editorial team. From 1981 onwards, Computerwoche was produced completely in-house right up to the finished print template.

Due to criticism of the layout from the editorial team and publisher, plans for a redesign were made in mid-1986. In February 1989 the zero number with the future layout was created. On September 29, 1989, issue 40/1989 was published with the new layout, just in time for the Systems computer trade fair. The magazine now had 148 pages and was printed in a 381 × 280 millimeter format. The front page featured a two-column colored graphic. A switch to desktop publishing (DTP) took place in autumn 1993 with issue 38/1993. Previously, some Macintosh Quadra with the QuarkXPress program were purchased and employees were retrained. From issue 10/1994, which appeared at the CeBIT trade fair, a press review was added and the news section, opinion pages and sections were designed in more color.

== Circulation statistics ==
After a steady increase in paid circulation to up to 48,281 copies in the 1st quarter of 2005, a scandal broke out. At the beginning of July 2005, IDG-Verlag reported the IVW figures for the 2nd quarter of 2005. The IVW, an institute responsible for checking the circulation of media, announced a follow-up audit because a significantly lower subscription share was reported. On July 8, 2005, Computerwoche withdrew from the IVW with immediate effect, making the IVW audit, which would have led to exclusion, superfluous. From then on, Computerwoche had its circulation, which was about half as high, certified by an auditor. In the third quarter of 2005, Computerwoche sold a total of 28,306 copies and distributed 54,742 copies. These figures were certified by the auditing company Deloitte in accordance with the usual industry criteria. Computerwoche has been included in the IVW again since 2007.
