= Niyogi (disambiguation) =

Niyogi is a caste of Brahmins.

Niyogi may also refer to:

- Audrey Stevens Niyogi, American biochemist and co-discoverer of RNA polymerase
- Jnananjan Niyogi, social reformer and activist with the Indian Independence Movement
- Kanailal Niyogi, activist for the Bengali Language Movement
- Partha Niyogi, professor of computer science and statistics at the University of Chicago
- Shankar Guha Niyogi, Indian labor activist

== See also ==
- Niyog (disambiguation)
