= Michael Herzog (neuroscientist) =

German neuroscientist (born 1964)

Professor Michael H. Herzog
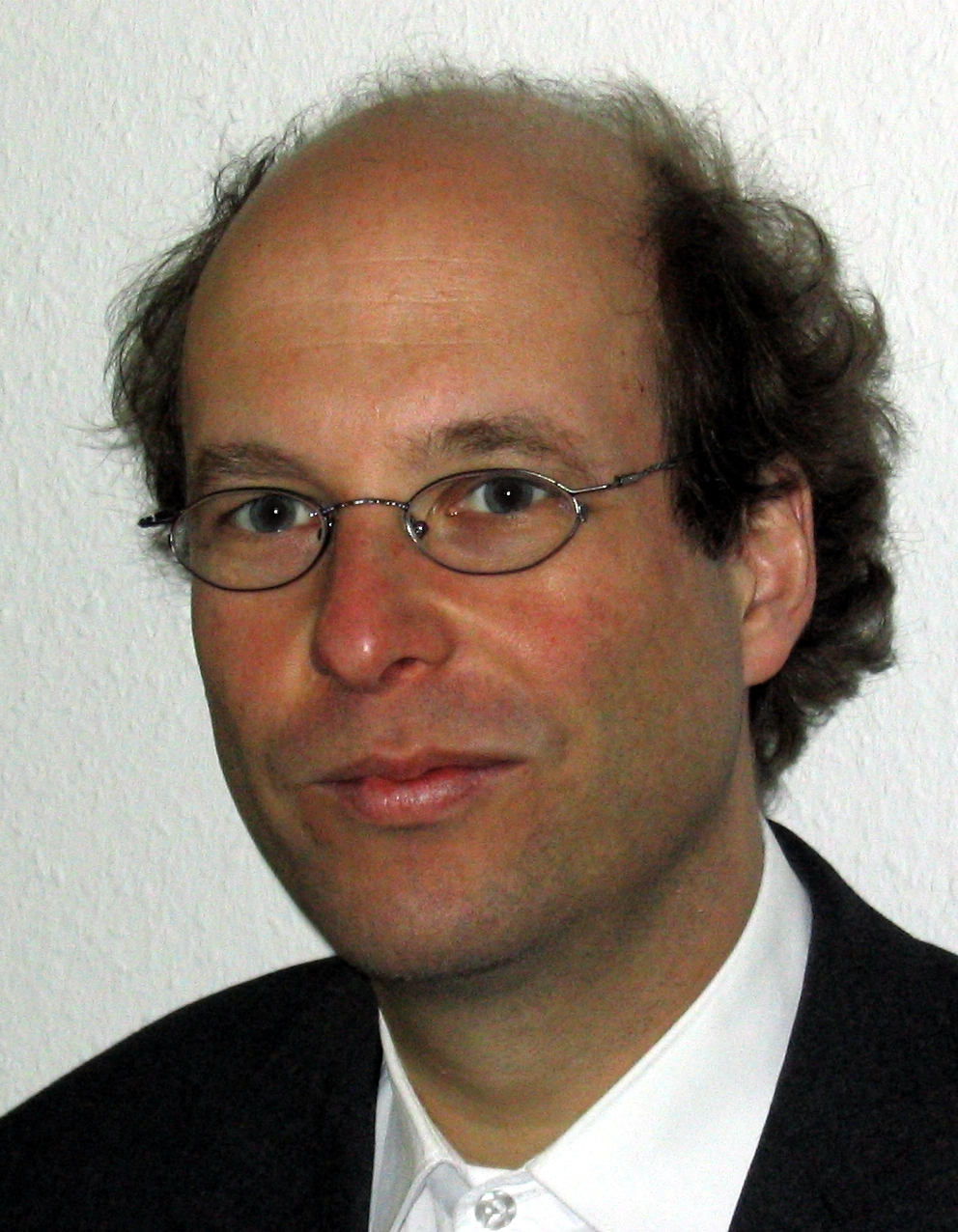
- Michael Herzog in 2010
- Born: 1964 (age 61–62)
- Citizenship: Germany
- Known for: Ageing; Perception; Schizophrenia; Consciousness

Academic background
- Education: Biology; Neuroscience; Mathematics
- Alma mater: University of Erlangen; University of Tübingen; MIT
- Doctoral advisor: Tomaso Poggio; Manfred Fahle
- Other advisors: Christof Koch; Manfred Fahle

Academic work
- Discipline: Neuroscience
- Sub-discipline: Psychophysics
- Institutions: EPFL (École Polytechnique Fédérale de Lausanne)
- Website: https://www.epfl.ch/labs/lpsy

Michael Herzog (born 1964) is a German neuroscientist and psychophysicist. His interdisciplinary research draws on biology, neurosciences, mathematics, and philosophy with a focus on perception. Herzog is a professor for neuroscience at the School of Life Sciences at EPFL (École Polytechnique Fédérale de Lausanne) and head of the Laboratory of Psychophysics.

== Career ==
Herzog studied mathematics, biology and philosophy at the University of Erlangen, at the University of Tübingen, and at the Massachusetts Institute of Technology (MIT). In 1992, he received a diploma in mathematics from the University of Tübingen for his thesis on "Automorphism groups of Hamming graphs" supervised by Christoph Hering. In 1993, Herzog earned a master's degree in philosophy from the University of Tübingen for his research with Herbert Keuth about approaches to intentionality and representation. He then joined Manfred Fahle at the University of Tübingen and Tomaso Poggio at MIT, and earned a PhD in biology for his thesis on "mathematical models and psychophysical experiments of perceptual learning".

From 1998 to 1999, he joined the laboratory of Christof Koch at California Institute of Technology as a postdoctoral fellow to investigating the characteristics of temporal processing and feature integration. In 1999, he went to work as a senior researcher with Manfred Fahle at the section of Human Neurobiology at the University of Bremen where he was project leader at the Center of Excellence 517 on "Neurocognition" that was funded by German Research Council (DFG). In 2003 he became a professor for neurobiopsychology at the Osnabrück University for one year.

In 2004, Herzog was appointed as professor for neuroscience at the Brain Mind Institute of the School of Life Sciences at EPFL and head of the Laboratory of Psychophysics. In 2015, he was promoted as Full Professor at EPFL.

== Research ==
Herzog's laboratory investigates visual information processing in humans applying psychophysical methods, TMS, EEG, and mathematical modelling. Their research focuses on feature integration, contextual modulation, time course of information processing, and perceptual learning. They also perform clinical studies in schizophrenic patients and healthy older people to study visual information processing deficits.

== Selected works ==
- Herzog, Michael H.; Drissi-Daoudi, Leila; Doerig, Adrien (2020). "All in Good Time: Long-Lasting Postdictive Effects Reveal Discrete Perception". Trends in Cognitive Sciences. 24 (10): 826–837. doi:10.1016/j.tics.2020.07.001. hdl:2066/221896. PMID 32893140. S2CID 221472652.
- Da Cruz, Janir Ramos; Favrod, Ophélie; Roinishvili, Maya; Chkonia, Eka; Brand, Andreas; Mohr, Christine; Figueiredo, Patrícia; Herzog, Michael H. (2020). "EEG microstates are a candidate endophenotype for schizophrenia". Nature Communications. 11 (1): 3089. Bibcode:2020NatCo..11.3089D. doi:10.1038/s41467-020-16914-1. PMC 7303216. PMID 32555168. S2CID 219730748.
- Shaqiri, Albulena; Pilz, Karin S.; Cretenoud, Aline F.; Neumann, Konrad; Clarke, Aaron; Kunchulia, Marina; Herzog, Michael H. (2019). "No evidence for a common factor underlying visual abilities in healthy older people" (PDF). Developmental Psychology. 55 (8): 1775–1787. doi:10.1037/dev0000740. hdl:11693/53260. PMID 31192641. S2CID 189816539.
- Grzeczkowski, Lukasz; Clarke, Aaron M.; Francis, Gregory; Mast, Fred W.; Herzog, Michael H. (2017). "About individual differences in vision". Vision Research. 141: 282–292. doi:10.1016/j.visres.2016.10.006. hdl:11693/37316. PMID 27919676. S2CID 4772980.
- Herzog, Michael H.; Manassi, Mauro (2015). "Uncorking the bottleneck of crowding: A fresh look at object recognition". Current Opinion in Behavioral Sciences. 1: 86–93. doi:10.1016/j.cobeha.2014.10.006. S2CID 18809335.

Herzog is also the author of a text book:

- Herzog, Michael H.; Francis, Gregory; Clarke, Aaron (13 August 2019). Understanding Statistics and Experimental Design: How to Not Lie with Statistics. Springer. ISBN 978-3-030-03499-3.
