= Martin A. Giese =

German theoretical neuroscientist (born 1966)

Martin A. Giese (born 21 June 1966) is a German theoretical neuroscientist and biomedical engineer. He is a full professor at the University of Tübingen and head of the Section Computational Sensomotorics at the Hertie Institute for Clinical Brain Research (HIH) as well as at the Centre for Integrative Neuroscience (CIN), since 2008.

== Life ==
Martin Giese was born in Freising and grew up in Bochum, Germany. He studied electrical engineering and Psychology at Ruhr University Bochum, where he obtained a PhD in Neuroinformatics in 1998. As a postdoc, he worked in the Center for Biological and Computational Learning at the Massachusetts Institute of Technology, Cambridge, US, and in 2000 initiated the Boston Research Lab of Honda Americas, which was associated with M.I.T. From 2001 to 2007 he was junior research group leader in the field of computational neuroscience at the HIH. From 2007 to 2008 he was senior lecturer at the Department of Psychology at Bangor University, UK. Since 2008 he has been a Full Professor at the University of Tübingen, based at the University Hospital.

== Research ==
Giese's research focuses on neural mechanisms of the recognition of body movements and social perception, and specifically on the development of neural models. In addition, he works on computational methods for the analysis and representation of body and facial movements and technical applications, including computer animation, and applications in neurology and psychiatry. He works closely with physiologists and functional imaging experts studying cortical representations for the processing of social signals and motor behavior. In addition, his group works on the development of behavioral markers for neurological movement disorders and other applications, e.g., in psychiatry.

== Awards ==
- Junior Research Group funded by Volkswagen Foundation, 2001
- Grants from the Human Frontiers Science Foundation (HFSP), 2004 and 2016
- Synergy Grant from the European Research Council, 2019

== Publications ==
- N. Taubert, M. Stettler, R. Siebert, S. Spadacenta, L. Sting, P. Dicke et al., M.A. Giese, Shape-invariant encoding of dynamic primate facial expressions in human perception. eLife 10:e61197, 2021.
- L. Fedorov, D. Chang, M.A. Giese, H. Bülthoff, S. de la Rosa. Adaptation aftereffects reveal representations for encoding of contingent social actions. PNAS 115(29), 7515–7520, 2018.
- B. Li, J.P. Virtanen, A. Oeltermann, C. Schwarz, M.A. Giese, U. Ziemann et al. Lifting the Veil on the Dynamics of Neuronal Activities Evoked by Transcranial Magnetic Stimulation. eLife pii: e30552, 2017.
- M.A. Giese. Face Recognition: Canonical Mechanisms at Multiple Timescales. Curr Biol. 534–537, 26(13), 2016.
- A. Mukovskiy, C. Vassallo, M. Naveau, O. Stasse, P. Souères, M.A. Giese. Adaptive synthesis of dynamically feasible full-body movements for the humanoid robot HRP-2 by flexible combination of learned dynamic movement primitives. Robotics and Autonomous Systems, 91, 270, 2017.
- M.A. Giese, G. Rizzolatti. Neural and Computational Mechanisms of Action Processing: Interaction between Visual and Motor Representations. Neuron 167–180, 88(1), 2015.
- V. Caggiano, F. Fleischer, J.K. Pomper, M.A. Giese*, P. Thier*. Mirror Neurons in Monkey Premotor Area F5 Show Tuning for Critical Features of Visual Causality Perception. Curr Biol. 26(22):3077–3082, 2016 Nov 21. DOI: 10.1016/j.cub.2016.10.007. Epub 2016 Nov 3. PMID 27818177.
- D.A. Leopold, I.V. Bondar, M.A. Giese. Norm-based face encoding by single neurons in the monkey inferotemporal cortex. Nature 442(7102):572-5, 2006 Aug 3. DOI: 10.1038/nature04951. Epub 2006 Jul 5. PMID 16862123.
- M.A. Giese, T. Poggio. Neural mechanisms for the recognition of biological movements. Nature Rev Neurosci 4(3):179-92, 2003, Mar. DOI: 10.1038/nrn1057. PMID 12612631.
