= The Quest for Consciousness =

2004 book by Christof Koch

The Quest for Consciousness: A Neurobiological Approach
- Author: Christof Koch
- Language: English
- Subject: Consciousness
- Genre: Non-fiction
- Publication date: 2004

The Quest for Consciousness: A Neurobiological Approach is a 2004 book on consciousness written by Christof Koch.
