= Niyog =

Niyog may refer to:

- Niyoga, a Hindu tradition
- niyog, a term for "coconut" in the Philippines

== See also ==
- Niyogi (disambiguation)
- Niog, a locality in Bacoor near Manila in the Philippines
  - Niog LRT Station, a proposed station
- Niyog-niyogan, a species of vine
