= Earl K. Miller =

Cognitive neuroscientist

Earl Miller
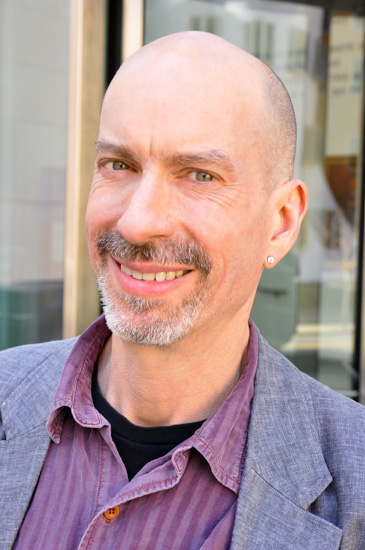
- Earl K. Miller 2022
- Born: Earl Keith Miller
- Education: Kent State University (BS, Doctor of Science, honoris causa); Princeton University (MS, PhD)
- Awards: Goldman-Rakic Prize for Outstanding Achievement in Cognitive Neuroscience (2016) Election to the American Academy of Arts and Sciences (2017) The George A. Miller Prize in Cognitive Neuroscience (2019) Troland Research Award (2000)
- Scientific career
- Fields: Neuroscience; Cognitive science
- Workplaces: Massachusetts Institute of Technology
- Thesis: Neurophysiological investigations of inferior temporal cortex of the macaque (1990)
- Doctoral advisor: Charles G. Gross
- Notable students: Joni Wallis (postdoc); David Freedman; Andreas Nieder (postdoc)
- Website: ekmillerlab.mit.edu/earl-miller/

Earl Keith Miller is a cognitive neuroscientist whose research focuses on neural mechanisms of cognition Earl K. Miller is the Picower Professor of Neuroscience with the Picower Institute for Learning and Memory and the Department of Brain and Cognitive Sciences at Massachusetts Institute of Technology. He is the Chief Scientist and co-founder of SplitSage. He is a co-founder of Neuroblox.

== Education ==
Miller received a Bachelor of Arts degree (summa cum laude, with honors) in psychology from Kent State University in 1985, Master of Arts degree in psychology and neuroscience from Princeton University in 1987, and a PhD in psychology and neuroscience from Princeton University in 1990. In 2020, Earl Miller was awarded an honorary doctorate (Doctor of Science, honoris causa) from Kent State University.

== Career ==
Miller's dissertation on neurophysiological investigations of the inferior temporal cortex in the macaque was supervised by Charles G. Gross at Princeton University. From 1990–1995 he was a postdoctoral research fellow in the laboratory of neuropsychology at the National Institute of Mental Health under supervision of Robert Desimone.

In 1995, Miller joined the faculty of the Department of Brain and Cognitive Sciences at MIT as Assistant Professor of Neuroscience and quickly advanced the academic ranks. He received tenure in 1999 (two years ahead of schedule) and became a full Professor in 2002. He was appointed to the Picower chair at MIT in 2003. He was Associate Director of the Picower Institute for Learning and Memory at MIT from 2001 to 2009, and was Director of Graduate Studies in Brain and Cognitive Sciences at MIT. He has delivered numerous lectures worldwide, serves as editor, and on the editorial boards of, major journals in neuroscience, and on international advisory boards. He has served on the scientific advisory boards of NeuroFocus, Thync, Motimatic, and Neurable. Miller is the co-founder and Chief Scientist of SplitSage and a co-founder of Neuroblox.

== Research ==
Miller studies the neural basis of executive brain functions. Executive functions are the ability to carry out goal-directed behavior using complex mental processes and cognitive abilities. This includes working memory, attention, decision-making and learning. His lab has had made discoveries about the neural circuits, networks, and mechanisms by which the brain's prefrontal cortex wields executive control. They have shown how categories and concepts are learned, how multifunctional, mixed-selectivity neurons endow the cortex with computational versatility and flexibility, and how neural oscillations regulate neural communication and consciousness. This work has established a foundation upon which to construct more detailed, mechanistic accounts of cognition and its dysfunction in diseases such as autism, schizophrenia and attention deficit hyperactivity disorder.

Examples of discoveries from Miller's laboratory include the neural basis of abstract rules like "same vs. different", categories, quantity, and the allocation of attentional resources. They have also shown how the brain can learn and flexibly remap associations. The Miller Lab has shown that cortical neurons can be multifunctional (i.e., show "mixed selectivity"). This is a major advance beyond earlier theories that each neuron has a specific function. This property gives the brain greater computational horsepower and endows flexibility, a hallmark of higher-level cognition.

Miller has innovated techniques for recording from many neurons simultaneously in multiple brain areas, a departure from the classic single-neuron recording approach. It has revealed network dynamics and emergent properties that are not possible by studying individual neurons. Miller's lab has used this approach to understand how network interactions produce thought and action. This includes discoveries that oscillating "brain waves" control the timing of shifts of attention and that different items simultaneously held in working memory line up on different phases of each brain wave. The latter may explain why we can only think about a few things at the same time. They have shown that lower-frequency (alpha/beta) brain waves act as a top-down control signal that regulates sensory processing in cortex. They found that brain waves transfer information between the left and right cerebral cortex. They have shown how the general anesthetic, propofol, induces unconsciousness by shifting cortical brain waves to low frequencies

Miller's paper with Jonathan Cohen, An Integrative Theory of Prefrontal Cortex Function, has been designated a Current Classic as among the most cited papers in Neuroscience and Behavior. It is the 5th most-cited paper in the history of Neuroscience. His paper with Tim Buschman, Top-down versus Bottom-up Control of Attention in the Prefrontal and Posterior Parietal Cortices was The Scientist's Hot Paper for October 2009. Earl K. Miler was named in the top 2% of scientists worldwide He has been cited in over 65,000 publications

== Selected Awards and Honors ==
- Excellence in Graduate Mentoring, Department of Brain and Cognitive Sciences, MIT (2025)
- Doctor of Science (honoris causa), Kent State University (2020).
- The George A. Miller Prize in Cognitive Neuroscience (2019).
- Elected to the American Academy of Arts and Sciences (2017)
- Paul and Lilah Newton Brain Science Award (2017)
- The Goldman-Rakic Prize for Outstanding Achievement in Cognitive Neuroscience (2016)
- Kent State University Professional Achievement Award (2016).
- Elected to the Memory Disorders Research Society, 2016
- Amar G. Bose Research Fellowship (2014),
- MERIT Award, National Institute of Mental Health (2010)
- Picower Professorship at MIT (endowed chair) (2003)
- The Society for Neuroscience Young Investigator Award (2000)
- National Academy of SciencesTroland Research Award (2000)
- Tenured at MIT two years ahead of schedule (1999)
- Pew Scholar Award (1996)
- Alfred P. Sloan Research Fellow (1996)
- Phi Beta Kappa (1985)

== Business ==
The discovery that different individuals have different perceptual capacities in different parts of their field of view led Earl Miller to found SplitSage. SplitSage uses a patented process to assess these individual differences. It can be used to customize displays, develop individualized training, and organize teams to maximize information throughput and improve situational awareness and performance.

Earl Miller is co-founder of Neuroblox, a platform for modeling neural control circuits and their regulation that aims to provide advanced diagnostics and simulation to enhance brain health care

== Media Appearances ==
Miller has made frequent appearances in the popular press. He was profiled in Discover Magazine and The New Yorker. He wrote a guest column in Fortune. Professor Miller has appeared on NBC's Today Show, on CBS Sunday Morning with Jane Pauley, and has been a frequent guest on National Public Radio and other radio talk shows as well as podcasts. He has been quoted and/or his work profiled in the New York Times, The Washington Post, CNN, MSNBC, Time, ABC News, Slate, The Boston Globe, The Times of London, Forbes etc. A list of media appearances is online.

== Philanthropy ==
Miller has funded a charitable trust to create scholarships for disadvantaged students at his alma mater Kent State University. The "Earl K. Miller First Generation Scholarship" provides financial support for first generation college students in need of aid.
