= Neural substrate =

Regions of the central nervous system which correspond to different cognitive processes

A neural substrate is a term used in neuroscience and neuropsychology to indicate the part of the central nervous system (i.e., brain and spinal cord) that underlies a specific behavior, cognitive process, or psychological state. Neural is an adjective relating to "a nerve or the nervous system", while a substrate is an "underlying substance or layer".

Some examples are the neural substrates of language acquisition, memory, prediction and reward, pleasure, facial recognition, envisioning the future, intentional empathy, religious experience, spontaneous musical performance, and anxiety.

== See also ==
- Neural correlate
- Neural substrates of visual imagery
- Dissociation
