= Laurent Itti =

American computer scientist (born 1970)

Laurent Itti

Laurent Itti (born December 12, 1970, in Tours, France) is a computational neuroscientist. He received his MS in image processing from the École Nationale Supérieure des Télécommunications de Paris in 1994, and a PhD in computation and neural systems from Caltech in 2000. He is currently an associate professor of computer science, psychology, and neuroscience at the University of Southern California, where he has been since 2000.

As a PhD student under the tutelage of Christof Koch, Itti developed a computer model that simulates brain mechanisms involved in the deployment of visual attention. This so-called saliency model has been cited by thousands of peer-reviewed publications. The software implementation of this model is part of the iLab Neuromorphic Vision Toolkit, which is freely distributed under the GNU general public license.

Itti has also been very active in developing computer vision applications, particularly in the context of autonomous vehicles (both terrestrial and underwater) as well as in comparing model simulations to empirical measurements based on a wide spectrum of techniques, including eye tracking, psychophysics, neuroimaging, and electrophysiology.

Itti is credited with authoring several dozens of peer-reviewed publications and 3 image processing patents. He also co-developed the Coregistration for Neuroimaging Systems software package, a suite of image processing tools for analyzing neuroimaging data, which is routinely used by several hospitals and research labs in the U.S. and Europe.

== Books ==
- Neurobiology of Attention, Academic Press, (2005), ISBN 0-12-375731-2

== Current and Previous Students ==
- Vidya Navalpakkam
- T Nathan Mundhenk
- Jinal Jhaveri
