= Joni Wallis =

American cognitive neurophysiologist and academic

- Education: University of Manchester (BSc); University of Cambridge (PhD)
- Scientific career
- Fields: Cognitive neuroscience Neurophysiology; Decision making Reinforcement learning
- Workplaces: University of California, Berkeley
- Thesis: Functions of the orbital and medial prefrontal cortex of the common marmoset (Callithrix jacchus) (2000)
- Doctoral advisor: Angela C. Roberts
- Other academic advisors: Earl K. Miller
- Website: wallislab.org

Joni Wallis is a cognitive neurophysiologist and Professor in the Department of Psychology at the University of California, Berkeley.

== Education and early career ==
Wallis received her Bachelors of Science in Psychology and Neuroscience from the University of Manchester in 1995. She received her PhD in Experimental Psychology and Anatomy from the University of Cambridge, where she worked in the laboratory of Angela C. Roberts.

== Career and research ==
Wallis moved to the United States for her postdoctoral research fellowship in the laboratory of Earl K. Miller studying neuronal activity in the prefrontal cortex, or the region of the brain that plays a key role in executive functions, which allow animals to coordinate appropriate responses to plan, reason, problem solve, and effectively reach goals. There, she explored the neural basis of how the prefrontal cortex encodes abstract rules to inform decisions under different circumstances.

Wallis's research centers on understanding how the frontal cortex of the brain is functionally organized to help people set and attain goals at the level of single neurons. Decision making requires weighing the costs and benefits of different courses of action. Wallis's group has investigated how cost-benefit analysis is undertaken in the brain to make effective decisions by monitoring single neuronal activity. They trained monkeys to make decisions that required integrating reward that required a certain amount of effort cost or a certain amount of delay cost. They found that single prefrontal cortex neurons played a role in encoding the type of cost decision the monkeys faced. The finding built on Wallis's previous work that found individual neurons in this region encoded several decision attributes, such as the probability of reward, the magnitude of the reward, and how much effort that reward would require. Her research group also found that neurons involved in associating stimuli with certain rewarding outcomes are found in the orbitofrontal cortex, while neurons involved in associating actions with certain rewarding outcomes are found in the anterior cingulate cortex.

Wallis's group has also studied the dynamics of decision making in both humans and monkeys over the period of time over which they are making a particular decision. Using primate neurophysiology and human magnetoencephalography, they measured how brain activity changed as primates and humans were making different decisions. Their findings were consistent with a mathematical model of decision making, drawing connections between economic models of choice and the underlying neuroscience. In a different study, Wallis's group was able to deduce neuronal signatures as the brains of monkeys evaluate different choices, tracking the dynamics of neurons firing over time and space in the orbitofrontal cortex of the brain. When considering two options, the group of neurons associated with each of the two options would alternate firing, flipping back and forth between the two options before finally deciding.

Her research is currently supported by two Research Project Grants (R01) awarded by the National Institute of Mental Health—one for the Functional Architecture of the Oribitofrontal Cortex awarded in 2014 and the other for the Frontostriatal Rhythms Underlying Reinforcement Learning awarded in 2018. The ultimate goal of her group's work is to better understand how to develop treatments for mental illness. She was first drawn to the field after her PhD supervisor introduced her to patients who sustained damage to their orbitofrontal cortex and had difficulty making decisions, despite having other cognitive processes intact.

== Awards and honors ==
- The Marian C. Diamond & Arnold B. Scheibel Fund in Neuroscience, 2020
