= Vector Graphic =

Computer company

Vector Graphic, Inc.
- Industry: Computer hardware
- Founded: 1976
- Founders: Carole Ely; Lore Harp
- Fate: Dissolved 1987
- Headquarters: Newbury Park, California, United States
- Area served: Worldwide
- Products: Desktop computers

Vector Graphic, Inc., was a microcomputer company founded in 1976.

== History ==
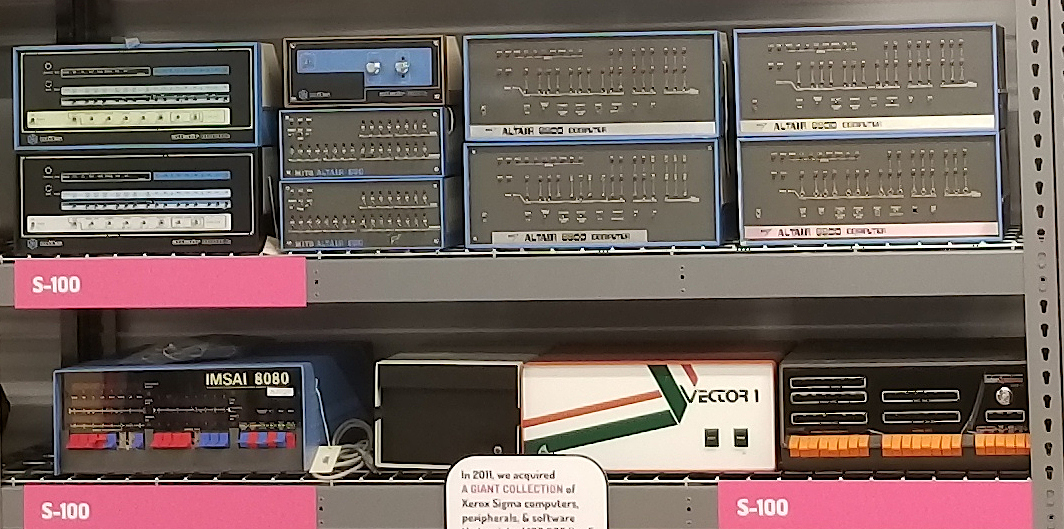
A Vector 1, an IMSAI 8080, and several Altair 8800 computers on a shelf at Living Computers: Museum + Labs

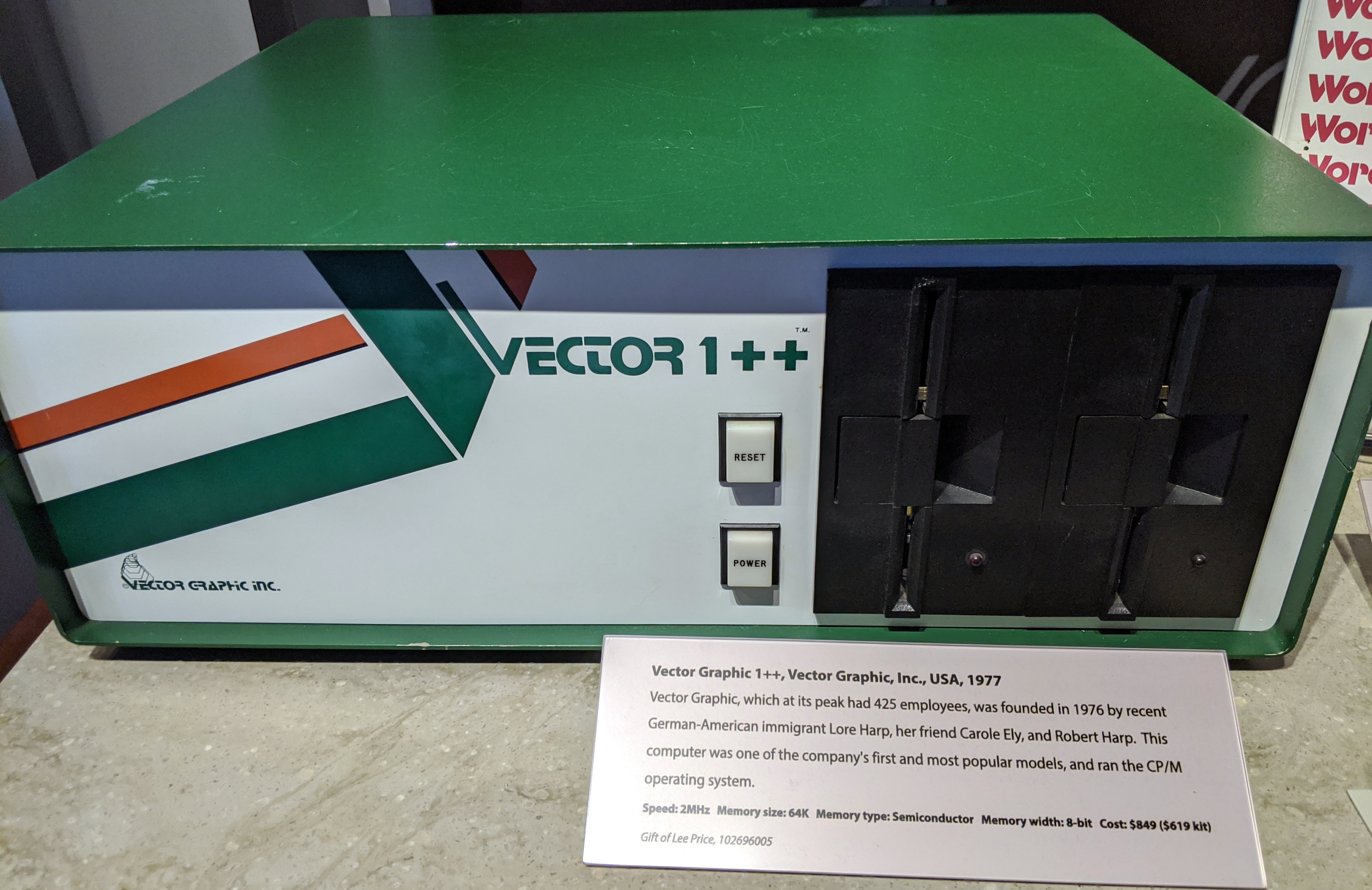
A Vector 1++ at the Computer History Museum

The company's first product was a memory card for the S-100 bus. A full microcomputer using the Z80 microprocessor, the Vector 1, was introduced in 1977. There were several Vector Graphic models produced. The Vector 1+ had a floppy disk drive. The Vector Graphic 3 had a fixed keyboard housed in a combined screen terminal and CPU case. The Vector Graphic 4 was a transitional 8-bit and 16-bit hybrid model.

Although primarily used with the CP/M operating system, the Vector 3 ran several others including OASIS, Micropolis Disk Operating System (MDOS), and Micropolis Z80 Operating System (MZOS).

Early Vector Graphic models used the Micropolis floppy disk controller and Micropolis floppy disk drives. Later models were designed with the integrated floppy drive-hard drive controller and used Tandon floppy drives.

Almost all used unusual 100-track per inch 5¼-inch floppy drives and 16-sector hard sector media. Some models included 8-inch floppy drives and hard disk drives.

Vector Graphic sales peaked in 1982, when the company was publicly trading at $36 million. It faltered soon after due to several factors. The introduction of the IBM PC in August 1981 shifted the market and smaller players lost momentum. The Vector 4 was accidentally pre-announced in April 1982, the same month that founder and chief hardware designer Robert Harp left the company after a dispute with co-founder (and wife) Lore Harp over control of the company.

Vector Graphic's sales through Computerland reportedly declined significantly after the retailer began selling the IBM PC, causing Vector to discontinue the relationship. The early announcement of the Vector 4, which had a separate keyboard tethered to the computer (as opposed to a combined keyboard and terminal) resulted in a sharp decrease in sales of the Vector 3 as customers delayed purchases up to six months until the new product was available.

In addition, the company had decided to use the CP/M operating system in the Vector 4, which they considered a superior operating system to MDOS. Management recognized the nature of their gamble, as IBM would move the market in a different direction if it elected to use the DOS operating system for their competing product, the IBM 8080. The gamble did not pay off, and by the end of 1984 Lore Harp was gone and venture capital investors took over.

By summer 1985, only three dozen employees remained, down from a peak of 425 workers in 1982. Ultimately, the Vector Graphic headquarters and assembly factory, across from a 17-person company (Amgen) and next to the 101 freeway, was converted into a Home Depot store. Chapter 11 bankruptcy followed in December 1985. A sought-for merger partner was not found and chapter 7 liquidation of remaining assets resulted in October 1987.

Vector Graphic computers had many innovations, such as the Flashwriter integrated video and keyboard controller. Vector Graphic was known for their Memorite word processing application. When combined with the Flashwriter, the Vector Graphic Memorite software gave low-cost word processing capability, which had previously only been available with dedicated word processors.

As of 2007, Vector Graphic still had a small but active user community.

== See also ==
- Corona Data Systems - founded in 1982 by Robert Harp
