= Computerworld =

American information technology magazine

- Computerworld cover for Volume 45, Issue 14, August 8, 2011
- Executive Editor: Ken Mingis
- Categories: Computer magazine
- Frequency: Monthly (digital)
- Publisher: John Amato
- Total circulation: 101,598 (December 2012)
- Founder: Patrick Joseph McGovern
- Founded: 1967
- First issue: June 21, 1967; 59 years ago (an introductory issue called v. 1, no. 0 issued June 14, 1967)
- Final issue: June 23, 2014 (print)
- Company: FoundryCo, Inc. (Regent LP)
- Country: United States
- Based in: Framingham, Mass.
- Language: English
- Website: www.computerworld.com
- ISSN: 0010-4841

Computerworld (abbreviated as CW) is a computer magazine published since 1967 aimed at information technology (IT) and business technology professionals. Original a print magazine, Computerworld published its final print issue in 2014; since then, it has been available as an online news website and as an online magazine.

As a printed weekly during the 1970s and into the 1980s, Computerworld was the leading trade publication in the data processing industry. Based on circulation and revenue it was one of the most successful trade publications in any industry. Later in the 1980s it began to lose its dominant position.

It is published in many countries around the world under the same or similar names. Each country's version of Computerworld includes original content and is managed independently. The publisher of Computerworld, Foundry (formerly IDG Communications), is a subsidiary of Regent LP.

== History ==
The publication was launched in 1967 by International Data Group in Boston, whose founder was Patrick J. McGovern.

=== Going international ===
FoundryCo (formerly IDG Communications) offers the brand "Computerworld" in 47 countries worldwide, the name and frequency differ slightly though. When IDG established the Swedish edition in 1983 i.e., the title "Computerworld" was already registered in Sweden by another publisher. This is why the Swedish edition is named Computer Sweden. The corresponding German publication is called Computerwoche (which translates to "computer week") instead.

Computer Sweden was distributed as a morning newspaper in tabloid format (41 cm) in 51,000 copies (2007) with an estimated 120,000 readers. From 1999 to 2008, it was published three days a week, but since 2009, it was published only on Tuesdays and Fridays.

=== Going digital ===
In June 2014, Computerworld US abandoned its print edition, becoming an exclusively digital publication. One month later, the publisher started the monthly Computerworld Digital Magazine. In 2017 it published features and stories highlighting the magazine's history on the fiftieth anniversary.

Computerworld's website first appeared in 1996.

== Ongoing ==
Computerworld US serves IT and business management with coverage of information technology, emerging technologies and analysis of technology trends. Computerworld also publishes several notable special reports each year, including the 100 Best Places to Work in IT, IT Salary Survey, the DATA+ Editors' Choice Awards and the annual Forecast research report. Computerworld in the past has published stories that highlight the effects of immigration to the U.S. (e.g. the H-1B visa) on software engineers.

=== Staff ===
The executive editor of Computerworld in the U.S. is Ken Mingis, who leads a small staff of editors, writers and freelancers who cover a variety of enterprise IT topics (with a concentration on Windows, Mobile and Apple/Enterprise).

== See also ==
- Patrick Joseph McGovern
