= Gabriel Kreiman =

Argentine–American neuroscientist (born 1971)

- Born: 1971 (age 54–55); Buenos Aires, Argentina
- Education: University of Buenos Aires; California Institute of Technology
- Known for: Single‑neuron studies of perception and memory; biologically inspired AI models
- Scientific career
- Fields: Neuroscience · Computational neuroscience · Artificial intelligence
- Workplaces: Harvard Medical School; Boston Children's Hospital
- Thesis: On the neuronal activity in the human brain during visual recognition, imagery and binocular rivalry (2002)
- Doctoral advisor: Christof Koch
- Website: klab.tch.harvard.edu

Gabriel Kreiman is an Argentine‑American neuroscientist and AI researcher. He is a professor at Harvard Medical School and the associate director of the MIT–Harvard Center for Brains, Minds & Machines (CBMM). His research bridges neuroscience and artificial intelligence, and spans a wide range of topics, including episodic memory, visual perception, human single‑neuron physiology, psychophysics, and artificial intelligence. He is the CEO and Co-founder of Engramme.

== Early life and education ==
Gabriel Kreiman received a Licenciado (B.S.) in physical chemistry from the University of Buenos Aires in 1996, followed by an M.S. in computation and neural systems and a Ph.D. in biology (2002) from the California Institute of Technology, supervised by Christof Koch. His dissertation examined neuron‑level correlates of visual perception and memory in humans. After post‑doctoral work in Artificial Intelligence with Tomaso Poggio at MIT, he joined Harvard Medical School as a faculty.

== Career ==
Kreiman's research has addressed how visual information is represented by neurons in the human brain. Using neurophysiological recordings from epilepsy patients, Kreiman and colleagues reported that individual neurons in the medial temporal lobe exhibit selective and invariant responses to complex visual stimuli. Follow-up studies involving humans and macaques identified neurons that maintain similar responses across different views of the same person or object.

Kreiman has contributed to the development of computational models and AI algorithms based on neural mechanisms. In collaboration with William Lotter and David Cox, he co-developed PredNet, a recurrent neural network designed for next-frame video prediction using principles of predictive coding. The architecture and its relation to theories of brain function have been discussed in scientific and popular press. Kreiman's group has also developed novel continual learning and curriculum learning algorithms inspired by biological memory systems.

In studies of episodic memory, Kreiman and colleagues identified "boundary cells" in the human hippocampus that are active at the transitions between distinct events. These findings have been noted in reports by scientific organizations.

Kreiman founded the Brains, Minds and Machines (BMM) summer school in Woods Hole, MA, in 2014 The summer school provides a deep end introduction to the problem of intelligence - how the brain produces intelligent behavior and how we may be able to replicate intelligence in machines. Kreiman has been the director of the BMM course. The course continues to be taught every summer.

Kreiman has taught several courses at Harvard, including Visual recognition: biophysics and computation, and Biological and Artificial Intelligence.

Kreiman has trained a cadre of scholars in academia, industry and startups.

In 2025, he co-founded Engramme, a startup devoted to endowing humans with perfect and infinite memory. Kreiman has been the CEO of Engramme since 2025.

== Awards and honors ==
Kreiman is a recipient of the NIH Director's New Innovator Award (2009–2014), and a winner of the NSF CAREER Award (2010–2014). He received the Pisart Award for Vision Research from the Lighthouse Guild in 2015, and was named a McKnight Scholar by the McKnight Foundation in 2017.

He is also a recipient of the Lighthouse Guild award (2015), Society for Neuroscience Career Development Award (2010), the Klingenstein Fund Award in Neuroscience (2007), the Milton and Francis Clauser Doctoral Prize (2002), and the Lawrence L. and Audrey W. Ferguson Prize (2002) from the California Institute of Technology.

== In popular media ==
Kreiman's research with the Cogiate consortium to contrast different theories of consciousness published in Nature was extensively covered in media outlets including New York Times, Quanta Magazine, Nautilus, the Economist, TheDebrief, Forbes, Scientific American, Financial Times, Science and Nature. An Article in Harvard Magazine described work by Kreiman and colleagues on the possibility of building hybrids between biological and artificial neural networks. A 2019 collaboration involving Kreiman, Carlos Ponce, and Margaret Livingstone, which used artificial intelligence to generate images that strongly activate monkey face-processing neurons, was covered in several media outlets. The study was reported by Science and The Atlantic. The work was also discussed in Wired and Quanta Magazine, and was featured on Science Friday.

Research from the Kreiman group on volitional decision making was featured in MIT Technology Review in 2014. Kreiman's research on the neuronal circuits underlying memory in the human medial temporal lobe published in Nature in 2000 was highlighted in multiple venues, including Nature Reviews Neuroscience, Science News, Pasadena Star News, BrainWork, The Dallas Morning News, CNN, La Nacion, among many others.

== Books ==
- Visual Population Codes: Towards a Common Multivariate Framework for Cell Recording and Functional Imaging, MIT Press (2011) ISBN 9780262303576
- Single Neuron Studies of the Human Brain: Probing Cognition, MIT Press (2014) ISBN 9780262027205
- Biological and Computer Vision, Cambridge University Press (2021) ISBN 978-1108649995

== Selected Publications ==
- Kreiman G, Koch C, Fried I. (2000). “Imagery neurons in the human brain”. Nature, 408: 357-361. PMID: 11099042
- Hung C, Kreiman G, Poggio T, DiCarlo J. (2005). “Fast read-out of object identity from macaque inferior temporal cortex”. Science, 310:863-866. PMID:16272124
- Quian Quiroga R, Reddy L, Kreiman G, Koch C, Fried I. (2005). “Invariant visual representation by single neurons in the human brain”. Nature, 435:1102-1107. PMID:15973409
- Tang H, Schrimpf M, Lotter W, Moerman C, Paredes A, Ortega Caro J, Hardesty W, Cox D, Kreiman G. (2018) “Recurrent computations for visual pattern completion”. PNAS, 115:8835-8840. PMID: 30104363
- Lotter W, Kreiman G, Cox D. (2020) “A neural network trained for prediction mimics diverse features of biological neuroms and perception”. Nature Machine Intelligence, 2:210-219. PMID: 34291193
