= Dissociation (neuropsychology) =

Neuropsychology term

In neuropsychology, dissociation involves identifying the neural substrate of a particular brain function through identification of case studies, neuroimaging, or neuropsychological testing.

== Dissociation types ==
=== Single dissociation ===
When dissecting complex mental tasks into their subcomponents, a researcher can establish a "single dissociation" between functions. This is done by demonstrating that a lesion to brain structure A disrupts function X but not function Y. Such a demonstration allows one to infer that function X and function Y are independent of each other in some way.

Dr. Oliver Sacks has described many famous cases of dissociation in his books. Patient D.F., for example, was unable to place a card in a slot, but could do so when told to place it "as if mailing a letter". From this the conclusion was drawn that judging orientation is one ability (which D.F. had lost) and visual control of an action another (which D.F. could still do).

=== Double dissociation ===
To strengthen a single dissociation, a researcher can establish a "double dissociation", a term that was introduced by Hans-Lukas Teuber in 1955. This is the demonstration that two experimental manipulations each have different effects on two dependent variables; if one manipulation affects the first variable and not the second, the other manipulation affects the second variable and not the first. If one can demonstrate that a lesion in brain structure A impairs function X but not Y, and further demonstrate that a lesion to brain structure B impairs function Y but spares function X, one can make more specific inferences about brain function and function localization.

In cognitive neuroscience, double dissociation is an experimental technique by which two areas of neocortex are functionally dissociated by two behavioral tests, each test being affected by a lesion in one zone and not the other. In a series of patients with traumatic brain injury, one might find two patients, A and B. Patient A has difficulty performing cognitive tests for, say auditory memory but has no problem with visual memory. Patient B has the opposite problem. By using neuroimaging (or neuropathology post-mortem) to identify the overlap and dissociation between lesioned areas of the brain, one can infer something about the localization of visual and auditory function in the normal brain.

Establishing a single dissociation between two functions provides limited and potentially misleading information, whereas a double dissociation can conclusively demonstrate that the two functions are localized in different areas of the brain.

To make the difference between single and double dissociations easier to understand, Parkin gives the following example:

If your TV set suddenly loses the color you can conclude that picture transmission and color information must be separate processes (single dissociation: they cannot be independent because you cannot lose the picture and still have the color). If on the other hand you have two TV sets, one without sound and one without a picture you can conclude that these must be two independent functions (double dissociation).

=== Examples of double dissociations ===
Paul Broca and Carl Wernicke were two physicians of the 1800s whose patients were evidence of the double dissociation between generating language (speech) and understanding language. Broca's patients could no longer speak but could understand language (non-fluent aphasia) while Wernicke's patients could no longer understand language but could produce jumbled speech (fluent aphasia). Post-mortems revealed lesions in separate areas of the brain in each case (now referred to as Broca's area and Wernicke's area respectively). Although the neurophysiology of language is now known to be more complicated than described by Broca or Wernicke, this classic double dissociation acted to begin modern neuropsychological investigation of language.

The conditions Capgras delusion and prosopagnosia have also been argued to represent a double dissociation. In the former, a patient is able to recognise a person but does not get the feeling of knowing them. In the latter, a patient is unable to recognise a familiar person but sometimes has a feeling of knowing.
