= Striosome =

Identifiers
- NeuroLex ID: nlx_anat_20090506

The striosomes (also referred to as striatal patches) are one of two complementary chemical compartments within the striatum (the other compartment is known as the matrix) that can be visualized by staining for immunocytochemical markers such as mu opioid receptors, acetylcholinesterase, enkephalin, substance P, limbic system-associated membrane protein (LAMP), AMPA receptor subunit 1 (GluR1), dopamine receptor subunits, and calcium binding proteins. Striosomal abnormalities have been associated with neurological disorders, such as mood dysfunction in Huntington's disease, though their precise function remains unknown. Recently studies have identified the presence of "exo-patch" neurons that are biochemically and genetically the same as striosomal neurons, but reside in the matrix compartment. This study also characterized the different input and output connections of the striosome and matrix compartments, revealing that both regions have direct inputs to dopamine neurons (though the striosome inputs are somatic whereas the matrix targets distal dendrites). The authors also revealed unique inputs to the striosome from subcortical limbic structures like the amygdala and bed nucleus of the stria terminalis.

Striosomes were discovered by Candace Pert in 1976 based on mu opioid receptor autoradiography and Ann Graybiel in 1978 using acetylcholinesterase histochemistry.

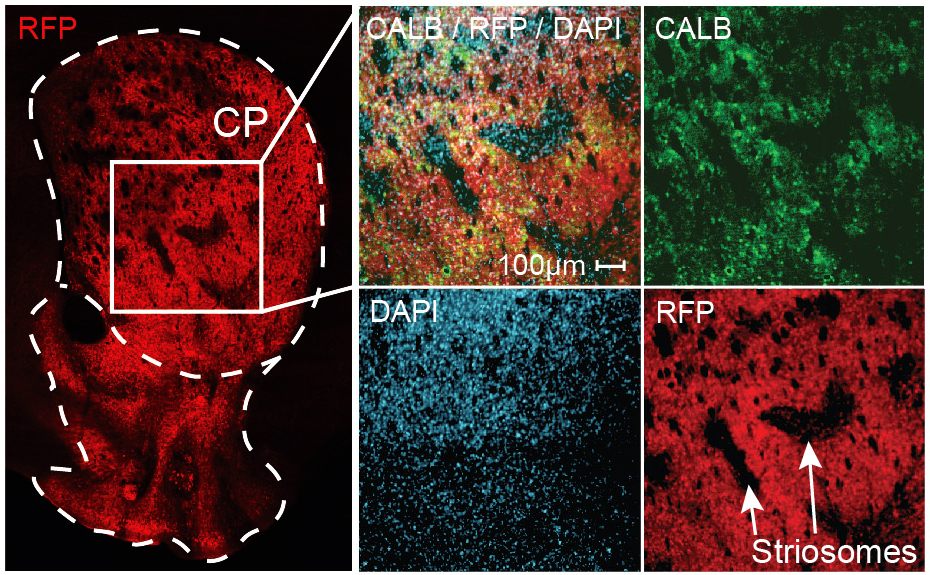
Matrix and Striosome Compartments: Fluorescence microscopy image of a coronal mouse brain section, cut through the striatum (caudate putamen, CP). The matrix/striosome division is here revealed by dual immunohistochemical (calbindin, CALB; green) and transgenic (red fluorescent protein, RFP; red) labeling of the matrix compartment, using the matrix-specific Cre-mouse line Gpr101-Cre. Unlabeled patches constitute striosomes.
