= Biased competition theory =

Competition of objects for visual processing

Biased competition theory advocates the idea that each object in the visual field competes for cortical representation and cognitive processing. This theory suggests that the process of visual processing can be biased by other mental processes such as bottom-up and top-down systems which prioritize certain features of an object or whole items for attention and further processing. Biased competition theory is, simply stated, the competition of objects for processing. This competition can be biased, often toward the object that is currently attended in the visual field, or alternatively toward the object most relevant to behavior.

== History ==
Research into the subject of attentional mechanisms in regard to visual perception was undertaken as an attempt to better understand the functional principles and potential constraints surrounding visual perception Visual search tasks are commonly used by experimenters to aid the exploration of visual perception.

The classical view of visual attention suggests that there are two basic principles: the pre-attentive stage and the attentive stage. In the pre-attentive stage, an individual has an unlimited capacity for perception which is capable of processing information from the entire visual field concurrently. During the attentive stage, the processing of visual information corresponding to local spatial areas takes place. This classical view of visual attention suggests that there is no competition within the visual field. Within this theory an individual is assumed to be capable of processing all information provided concurrently. Until recently it was still thought that individuals had a pre-attentive stage. This is no longer the case, research has now suggested that the pre-attentive stage is now limited in its capacity.

The attentive stage of being able to process important information has now transformed into what is known as selectivity. The classical view of attention has built the ground work for the recent emergence of two new principles to benefit the understanding of visual attention. The first of these relates to the limited capacity of information processing. This suggests that at any given time, only a small amount of information can actually be retained and used to control behaviour. The principle of selectivity incorporates the notion that a person has the ability to filter out unwanted information. Koch and Ullman proposed that attentive selection could be implemented by competitive "winner-takes-all" networks.

Robert Desimone and John Duncan expanded on this idea. They proposed that at some point between the visual input of objects and the response to objects in the visual field there is some competition occurring; competition for representation, analysis, and behavior. This suggests that attention to stimuli makes more demands on processing capacity than unattended stimuli. This idea of competition led researchers to develop a new theory of attention, which they termed the “biased competition theory". The theory attempts to provide an explanation of the processes leading visual attention and their effects on the brain's neural systems.

== Function ==
Biased competition serves to prioritize task relevant information to make visual search more efficient. A large amount of visual information is taken in at any given moment and there is a limited capacity available for processing. The visual system therefore needs a way to select relevant information and ignore irrelevant stimuli. A visual search usually has a target (e.g. a coffee cup), which is being searched for (task relevant) in the visual environment, and task irrelevant information is ignored. The biasing from neural mechanisms guides the search to logical spatial locations (e.g. the table) and items that have similar semantic or visual features to the item that is being searched for. It has been suggested that more than 30 cortical areas in the visual system are used for the processing of visual stimuli, and that there is competition from objects in the visual field that takes place in multiple areas of this extensive network.

== The Biased Competition Model ==
Desimone suggested that the Biased Competition Model comprised five main tenets:

1. Objects presented simultaneously in the visual field compete for cell responses in the visual cortex. When two stimuli are presented at the same time they will activate their neuronal representations. The responses will be determined by these two stimuli interacting in a competitive manner.
2. Two stimuli that activate cells in the same area of the cortex will provide the strongest competitive interactions.
3. Competitive interactions have the ability to be biased in preference of one stimulus due to many different neural mechanisms. This is called feedback bias. These may include Top-down feedback (for example, one stimulus may hold more situational relevance) or Bottom-up influences (for example, one stimulus is more novel than another).
4. Feedback biasing is not purely the result of spatial location. Biasing during processing can be due to a stimuli possessing specific, relevant feature. Such features may include color, texture, and shape.
5. A main source of Top-down biasing derives from the structures in the brain involved with working memory, more specifically, from the prefrontal cortex.

== Neural mechanisms ==
There are two major neural pathways that process the information in the visual field; the ventral stream and the dorsal stream. The two pathways run in parallel and are both working simultaneously. The ventral stream is important for object recognition and often referred to as the “what” system of the brain; it projects to the inferior temporal cortex. The dorsal stream is important for spatial perception and performance and is referred to as the “where” system which projects to the posterior parietal cortex. According to the biased competition theory, an individual's visual system has limited capacity to process information about multiple objects at any given time. For example, if an individual was presented with two stimuli (objects) and was asked to identify attributes of each object at the same time, the individual's performance would be worse in comparison to if the objects were presented separately. This suggests multiple objects presented simultaneously in the visual field will compete for neural representation due to limited processing resources.

Single cell recording studies conducted by Kastner and Ungerleider examined the neural mechanisms behind the biased competition theory. In their experiment the size of the receptive field's (RF) of neurons within the visual cortex were examined. A single visual stimulus was presented alone in a neuron's RF, followed with another stimulus presented simultaneously within the same RF. The single ‘effective’ stimuli produced a low firing rate, whereas the two stimuli presented together produced a high firing rate. The response to the paired stimuli was reduced. This suggests that when two stimuli are presented together within a neuron's RF, the stimuli are processed in a mutually suppressive manner, rather than being processed independently. This suppression process, according to Kastner and Ungerleider, occurs when two stimuli are presented together because they compete for neural representation, due to limited cognitive processing capacity.

The RF experiment suggests that as the number of objects increase, the information available for each object will decrease due to increased neural workload (suppression), and decreased cognitive capacity. In order for an object in the visual field or RF be efficiently processed, there needs to be a way to bias these neurological resources towards the object. Attention prioritizes task relevant objects, biasing this process. For example, this bias can be towards an object which is currently attended to in the visual field or RF, or towards the object that is most relevant to one's behavior.

Functional magnetic resonance imaging (fMRI) has shown that biased competition theory can explain the observed attention effects at a neuronal level. Attention effects bias the internal weight (strengthens connections) of task relevant features toward the attended object. This was shown by Reddy, Kanwisher, and van Rullen who found an increase in oxygenated blood to a specific neuron following a locational cue. Further neurological support comes from neurophysiological studies which have shown that attention results from Top-down biasing, which in turn influences neuronal spiking. In sum, external inputs affect the Top-down guidance of attention, which bias specific neurons in the brain.

== Empirical evidence for Biased Competition Theory ==
Since the development of Biased Competition Theory much research has been undertaken to validate the theory's ideas.

Research has formulated predictions based on the theoretical model to be tested in experimental settings. Top-down and Bottom-up biases have been tested in order to ascertain the legitimacy of their influence on visual perception and competition as described by Biased Competition Theory. These experiments provide evidence for the idea of feedback biasing as described in Desimone's five central tenets.

=== Evidence of bottom-up process ===
Bottom-up processes are characterized by an absence of higher level direction in sensory processing. It primarily relies on sensory information and incoming sensory information is the starting point for all Bottom-up processing. Bottom-up refers to when a feature stands out in a visual search. This is commonly called the “pop-out” effect. Salient features like bright colors, movement and big objects make the object “pop-out” of the visual search. “Pop-out” features can often attract attention without conscious processing. Objects that stand out are often given priority (bias) in processing. Bottom-up processing is data driven, and according to this stimuli are perceived on the basis of the data which is being experienced through the senses.

Evidence suggests that simultaneously presented stimuli do in fact compete in order to be represented in the visual cortex, with stimuli mutually suppressing each other to gain this representation. This was examined by Reynolds and colleagues, who looked at the size of neurons’ receptive field's within the visual cortex. It was found that the presentation of a single stimulus resulted in a low firing rate while two stimuli presented together resulted in a higher firing rate. Reynolds and colleagues also found that when comparing the neural response of an individually presented visual stimulus to responses gathered from simultaneously presented stimuli, the responses of the concurrent presented stimuli were less than the sum of the responses gathered when each stimuli was presented alone. This suggests that two stimuli presented together increase neural work load required for attention. This increased neural load creates suppressive processes and causes the stimuli to compete for neural representation in the brain. Proulx and Egeth predicted that brighter objects would bias attention in favor of that object. Another prediction is that larger objects would bias the attention in favor of that object. The experiment was a computer-based visual search task, where participants searched for a target among distractions. The results of the study suggested that when irrelevant stimuli were large or bright, attention was biased towards the irrelevant objects, prioritizing them for cognitive processing. This research shows the effects of Bottom-up (stimulus-driven) processing on biased competition theory.

=== Evidence of top-down processes ===
A Top-down process is characterized by a high level of direction of sensory processing by more cognition; Top-down processing is based on pre-existing knowledge when interpreting sensory information.

Top-down guidance of attention refers to when the properties of an object (i.e. color, shape) are activated and held in working memory to facilitate the visual search for that object. This controls visual search by guiding attention only to objects that could be the target and avoiding attention on irrelevant objects. Top-down processes are not a complete representation of the object but are coarse, which is why objects similar in color, shape or meaning are often attended to in the process of discriminating irrelevant objects. There is evidence that observers have Top-down control over the locations that will benefit from biased competition in spatial selection visual tasks. Evidence supports that observers can make voluntary decision about which locations are selected or features that capture the attention in a stimulus-driven manner.

Neurophysiology studies have shown that the neural mechanisms in Top-down processing are also seen in attention and working memory, suggesting Top-down processes play an important role in those functions as well. Additionally, Top-down processes can modulate Bottom-up processes by suppressing the “pop-out” features of Bottom-up processing from distracting from the visual search.

fMRI studies have investigated the Top-down and Bottom-up processes involved in biased competition theory. Results of fMRI suggest that both Bottom-up and Top-down processes work in parallel to bias competition. Multiple studies have shown that stimuli in the visual field suppress each other when presented together, but not when each stimulus is presented alone. Kastner and colleagues also found that directing attention to the specific location of a stimulus reduces the suppressive effect. Increased activity in the visual cortex was also observed; this was the result of Top-down biasing due to the favoring of the attended location.

=== Further evidence ===
Another supposition of Biased Competition Theory, that competition is integrated across multiple systems in the brain (for example, the visual system as well as working memory), is least studied. However, empirical evidence has been undertaken to confirm the authenticity of this claim. Studies have shown this integration of differing brain systems by undertaking neuroimaging research. Activation in the middle temporal area, as well as the fusiform face area was seen when subjects were asked to attend to a moving face. The middle temporal area is involved in the perception of motion, while the fusiform face area is involved in facial recognition, showing the integrated systems of the brain in Biased Competition Theory. Ferrera and Lisberger provided evidence for competitive interactions in the selection of targets for smooth pursuit eye movements.
