= Patrick Joseph McGovern =

Billionaire businessman and entrepreneur

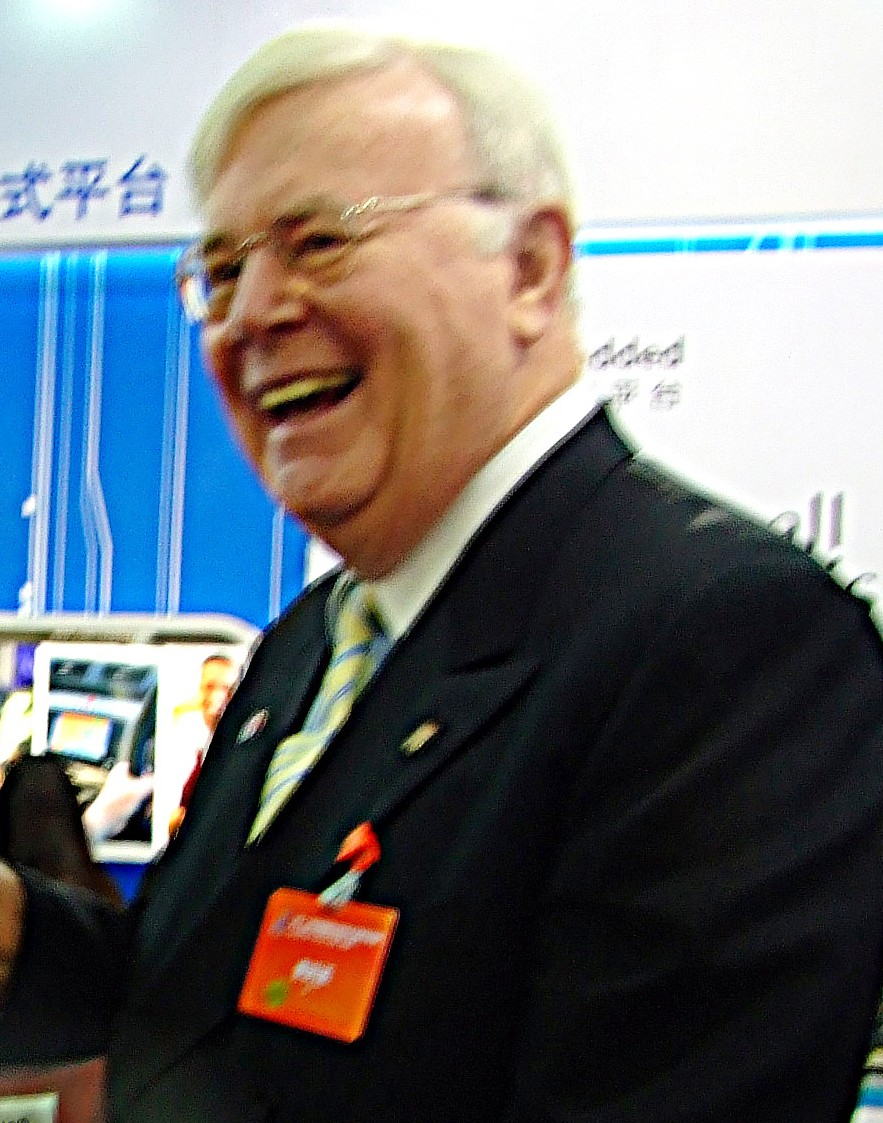
- McGovern at China Hi-Tech Fair in 2009
- Born: Patrick Joseph McGovern Jr. August 11, 1937; Queens, New York
- Died: March 19, 2014 (aged 76)
- Education: Massachusetts Institute of Technology (B.S., Biophysics, 1959)
- Occupations: Businessman, publisher, entrepreneur
- Known for: Founding Computerworld magazine, large donation to MIT to found the McGovern Institute for Brain Research
- Spouse: Lore Harp McGovern

Patrick Joseph McGovern Jr. (August 11, 1937 – March 19, 2014) was an American businessman, and chairman and founder of International Data Group (IDG), a company with subsidiaries in technology publishing, research, event management and venture capital.

In September 2013, he was listed on the Forbes 400 list of the wealthiest Americans, with a net worth of $5.1 billion.

== Biography ==
Forbes magazine wrote that in the 1950s, McGovern earned a college scholarship by designing an unbeatable tic-tac-toe program. During his sophomore year, he worked at the MIT student newspaper The Tech on the features staff. McGovern received a degree in course 7, or biology/life sciences, from MIT, in 1959.

After graduating, his first job was writing for a pioneering computer magazine, Edmund C. Berkeley's Computers and Automation. In 1964, McGovern founded International Data Corporation (IDC), which produced a computer-industry database and published the newsletter EDP Industry & Market Report (based on "ADP Newsletter", published by The Diebold Group). After three years, the company was losing money, and McGovern contemplated liquidating it. In 1967, he hit on the idea of making the newsletter into a weekly newspaper, Computerworld. After failing to wrest control of Computer and Automation from his friend and mentor Ed Berkeley, he subsequently started the magazine PC World.

In 1980, he created one of the first American-Chinese joint ventures, and in 1997, Forbes estimated that "Pat McGovern has more readers in China than the People's Daily does." In 1991, his company published "DOS For Dummies", the first of the very popular "For Dummies" series of books explaining various subjects to the layperson. Bloomberg News reported that IDG had 280 million regular readers of its publications, and annual revenues of $3.6 billion.

== Personal life ==
Although he was born in Queens, New York, his family moved when he was a child to Philadelphia, where he delivered newspapers at the age of eight. He was divorced once. He was the father of two children and two stepchildren, and divided his time between Hillsborough, California and Hollis, New Hampshire. He and his second wife donated $350 million to MIT to found the McGovern Institute for Brain Research. He was a trustee of MIT and of MIT's Whitehead Institute for Biomedical Research. He also served on the board of trustees Society for Science & the Public.

At the time of his death, surviving family members included his wife, Lore Harp McGovern, a son, Patrick McGovern, daughter Elizabeth McGovern, stepdaughters Michelle Harp Bethel and Dina Jackson, and nine grandchildren.

== Death ==
In May 2012, Patrick McGovern had open-heart surgery at the Cleveland Clinic. He died on March 19, 2014, aged 76.

=== IDG legacy ===
After his death, the ownership of IDG was transferred to the McGovern Foundation; in 2016, the foundation retained Goldman Sachs to explore a sale. On March 29, China Oceanwide Holdings Group announced the closure of the acquisition of International Data Group, Inc. ("IDG"). In June 2021, it was announced that the company had again been sold to The Blackstone Group, for $1.3 billion.
