= Lore Harp McGovern =

Computer industry pioneer

- Born: Lore Lange-Hegermann; March 3, 1944 (age 82); German-occupied Poland
- Other name: Lore Harp
- Education: California State University, Los Angeles (BA); Pepperdine University (MBA)
- Known for: Computing industry pioneer, founder of Vector Graphic
- Spouses: Robert S. Harp (m. 1968; div. 1982) Patrick J. McGovern (m. 1982; died 2014)
- Relatives: Hermann Lange-Hegermann (grandfather)

Lore Harp McGovern (née Lange-Hegermann, March 3, 1944) is an American entrepreneur and philanthropist based in California. She co-founded Vector Graphic, one of the earliest personal computing companies, in 1976. She served as the company's CEO and president, took it public, and oversaw annual revenue of $36 million before she left the company in 1984.

Harp McGovern was born in Poland under German occupation and moved to the United States after high school. She has founded or run companies in diverse fields including health care, educational publishing, and high-tech, and is an investor in numerous start-up companies in Silicon Valley.

== Early life, education and immigration ==
Lore Lange-Hegermann was born in German-occupied Poland on March 3, 1944. She grew up in Bottrop, West Germany, in a partially bombed-out building with her parents and grandparents. Her grandfather was businessman and Weimar Republic politician Hermann Lange-Hegermann. She attended a Catholic boarding school, learning English, French, and Latin, and graduated from a German high school.

At 19, she travelled to the United States and lived with a family in Santa Cruz, California, as part of an exchange. After hitchhiking to Mexico with a friend, she decided to stay in the United States against her parents' wishes. When her visa expired, she worked as a babysitter and took odd jobs. She later married Bob Harp, moved to Pasadena, and had two daughters. Harp attended California State University, Los Angeles, where she earned a bachelor's degree in anthropology, and later received an MBA from Pepperdine University in 1979.

== Career ==
=== Vector Graphic ===
After attending law school for a year, Harp met Carole Ely, a fellow housewife, mother and neighbor who had formerly worked as a bond trader. Both women were bored with being housewives and in 1976 they decided to start a business. After rejecting the idea of starting a travel agency, they settled on microelectronics. They based their business around an 8K RAM board for the S-100 bus of an Altair 8800 that Lore's husband had devised the previous year. They incorporated the firm Vector Graphic and registered the business in August 1976. They started the company with $6,000 in capital and Lore served as the CEO and president. Early on, she had a meeting with an AMD representative to purchase memory chips, and after finding the price too high, she arranged a deal with Fairchild Semiconductor. They began selling the RAM boards, cash on delivery, via mail orders and advertised the product in magazines. The company was run out of a spare bedroom in her Westlake Village home.

By 1977, Vector Graphic had designed the 1702 PROM board and the Vector 1, a full microcomputer using the Z80 microprocessor. In the company's first year, it had $1 million in sales. The company's success was due to the relationships that Harp and Ely forged with vendors, in addition to a focus on advertising, packaging, and better user manuals. They marketed their desktop computers to mid-size businesses, carving out a niche in the industry that other companies were not filling. Theirs was one of the earliest computer companies to consider aesthetics in design, producing computers with rounded edges available in multiple colors and coordinating the color of their capacitors with their memory boards. By 1981, the company's revenue had reached $36.2 million. Harp took the company public, and fought with the underwriters over her decision to grant stock to all of the company's employees. Following the success, Harp was featured on the front cover of several magazines, including Inc. in 1981. She gained a reputation for her tenacity and was called the "ice maiden". By 1982, the company had $36 million in annual sales.

Harp divorced her husband in 1982 and married Patrick J. McGovern the same year. She relinquished her role as president and CEO of Vector Graphic. The company rapidly declined, experiencing setbacks due to poor managerial decisions, mistimed advertising, and the entrance of IBM to the market. She returned to her leadership role in 1983, though she was unable to salvage the business and stepped down from the position in 1984.

=== Later business ventures ===
Harp McGovern later served as president of Aplex Corporation, a feminine hygiene company that designed a disposable paper funnel device enabling women to urinate while standing. She was also president and CEO of Good Morning Teacher!, an educational publishing company.

== Philanthropic activities ==
Harp McGovern and her husband Patrick co-founded the McGovern Institute for Brain Research at MIT in 2000. Their donation of approximately $350 million was among the largest gifts to a university at the time.

== Awards and honors ==
Harp McGovern was named Entrepreneur of the Year in 1983 by Women Business Owners of New York. The Commonwealth Club of San Francisco awarded her the Distinguished Immigrant Award. She has also served as the Chair Emerita of the Board of Associates of the Whitehead Institute for Biomedical Research.
