= International Data Corporation =

American market intelligence company

- Type: Private
- Industry: Market intelligence, advisory services, events
- Founded: 1964
- Founder: Patrick Joseph McGovern
- Headquarters: Boston, Massachusetts, United States
- Area served: Worldwide
- Key people: Lorenzo Larini, CEO
- Owner: Blackstone Inc.
- Website: idc.com

International Data Corporation (IDC) is an American market intelligence and advisory company covering the information technology, telecommunications, and consumer technology markets. The company provides research, data, analytics, advisory services, and events for technology vendors, enterprise technology buyers, and investors. IDC was formerly a publisher of a number of computer technology and gaming related magazine publications and websites, but it has divested itself from this sector.

International Data Corporation was founded in 1964 by Patrick Joseph McGovern. It later became part of International Data Group, which operated through two main businesses, IDC and IDG Communications, by the time of Blackstone Inc.'s 2021 acquisition. IDG Communications was later rebranded as Foundry, which International Data Group sold in 2025.

IDC is headquartered in Boston, Massachusetts. The company is led by chief executive officer Lorenzo Larini, who was appointed effective February 2, 2026.

== History ==
International Data Corporation was founded in 1964 by Patrick Joseph McGovern in Massachusetts. The company initially provided research and data on the emerging computer industry, including information on computer installations and technology markets. In 1967, McGovern launched Computerworld, a weekly newspaper for the computer industry, three years after founding IDC.

IDC and Computerworld became the foundation of International Data Group, which expanded into market research, publishing, events, and related businesses. International Data Group later owned technology publications and events including InfoWorld, Macworld, PC World, CIO, and the DEMO Conference.

After McGovern's death in 2014, ownership of International Data Group was transferred to the McGovern estate for the benefit of the Patrick J. McGovern Foundation. China Oceanwide Holdings Group acquired a majority stake in International Data Group in 2017. In 2021, Blackstone Inc. acquired International Data Group from China Oceanwide for $1.3 billion.

In 2022, IDG Communications, the company's media and marketing services business, was rebranded as Foundry. International Data Group sold Foundry to Regent LP in March 2025. After the sale, IDC stated that International Data Group had simplified its operations to focus on the IDC brand.

== Business ==
IDC provides technology market research and advisory services, including data and analysis used by technology vendors and their clients.

In May 2021, IDC acquired Metri, a Netherlands-based IT intelligence consultancy that provided IT benchmarking and sourcing advisory services.

In 2026, IDC introduced IDC Quanta, an AI-powered platform for accessing IDC research in customer workflows. A New Relic commentary on IDC Directions 2026 described Quanta as using the Model Context Protocol and including a collaboration with Anthropic to make IDC intelligence available within Claude workflows.
