= Christof Koch =

American neurophysiologist (born 1956)

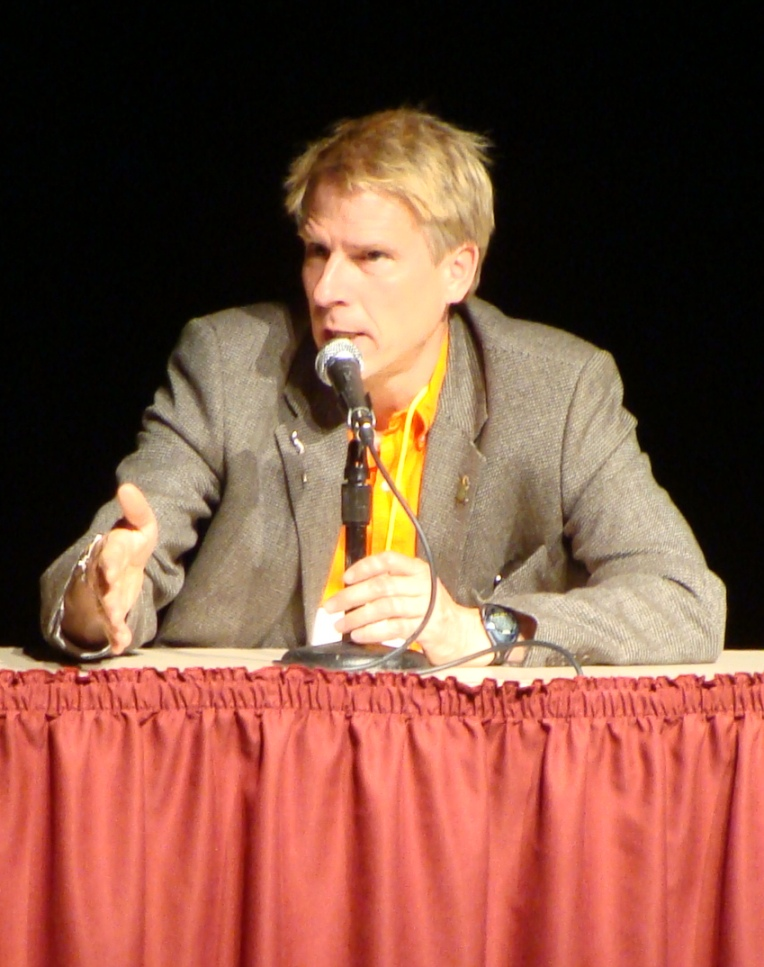
- Koch in 2008
- Born: November 13, 1956 (age 69); Kansas City, Missouri, US
- Education: University of Tübingen; Max Planck Institute for Biological Cybernetics
- Known for: Neural correlates of consciousness
- Scientific career
- Fields: neurophysiology; computational neuroscience; biophysics
- Workplaces: Allen Institute for Brain Science; California Institute of Technology
- Doctoral advisor: Valentin Braitenberg; Tomaso Poggio
- Doctoral students: Laurent Itti; Virgil Griffith; Fei-Fei Li; Anthony Zador; Gabriel Kreiman
- Website: christofkoch.com

Christof Koch (/kɒx/ KOKH; born November 13, 1956) is a German-American cognitive scientist, neurophysiologist, and computational neuroscientist, best known for his work on the neural basis of consciousness.

He was president and chief scientist of the Allen Institute for Brain Science in Seattle and remains at the Institute as a Meritorious Investigator.

He is also chief scientist of the Tiny Blue Dot Foundation, in Santa Monica, California, which funds research into alleviating people's suffering, anxiety, and other distress.

From 1986 until 2013, he was a professor at the California Institute of Technology.

== Early life and education ==
Koch was born in the Midwest of the United States. He is the son of German parents; his father was a diplomat, so he grew up in the Netherlands and Canada. Christof was raised a Roman Catholic and received his schooling in Germany over a period of 10 years. His interest in consciousness commenced when as a child he decided that consciousness must apply to all animals, not only to humans. Later he attended a Jesuit secondary school in Morocco. In 1982 he received a PhD from the Max Planck Institute in Tübingen, Germany, for his work in the field of nonlinear information processing. His older brother is the diplomat Michael Koch.

== Career ==
Koch has authored more than 350 scientific papers and six books about how computers and neurons process information. He worked four years at the Artificial Intelligence Laboratory at MIT before, in 1986, joining the newly started Computation and Neural Systems PhD program at the California Institute of Technology.

In 1986 Koch and Shimon Ullman proposed the idea of a visual saliency map in the primate visual system. Subsequently, his then PhD-student, Laurent Itti, and Koch developed a popular suite of visual saliency algorithms.

For over two decades, Koch and his students have carried out detailed biophysical simulations of the electrical properties of neuronal tissue, from simulating the details of the action potential propagation along axons and dendrites to the synthesis of the local field potential and the EEG from the electrical activity of large populations of excitable neurons.

Since the early 1990s, Koch has argued that identifying the mechanistic basis of consciousness is a scientifically tractable problem, and has been influential in arguing that consciousness can be approached using the modern tools of neurobiology. He and his student Nao Tsuchiya invented continuous flash suppression, an efficient psychophysical masking technique for rendering images invisible for many seconds. They have used this technique to argue that selective attention and consciousness are distinct phenomena, with distinct biological functions and mechanisms.

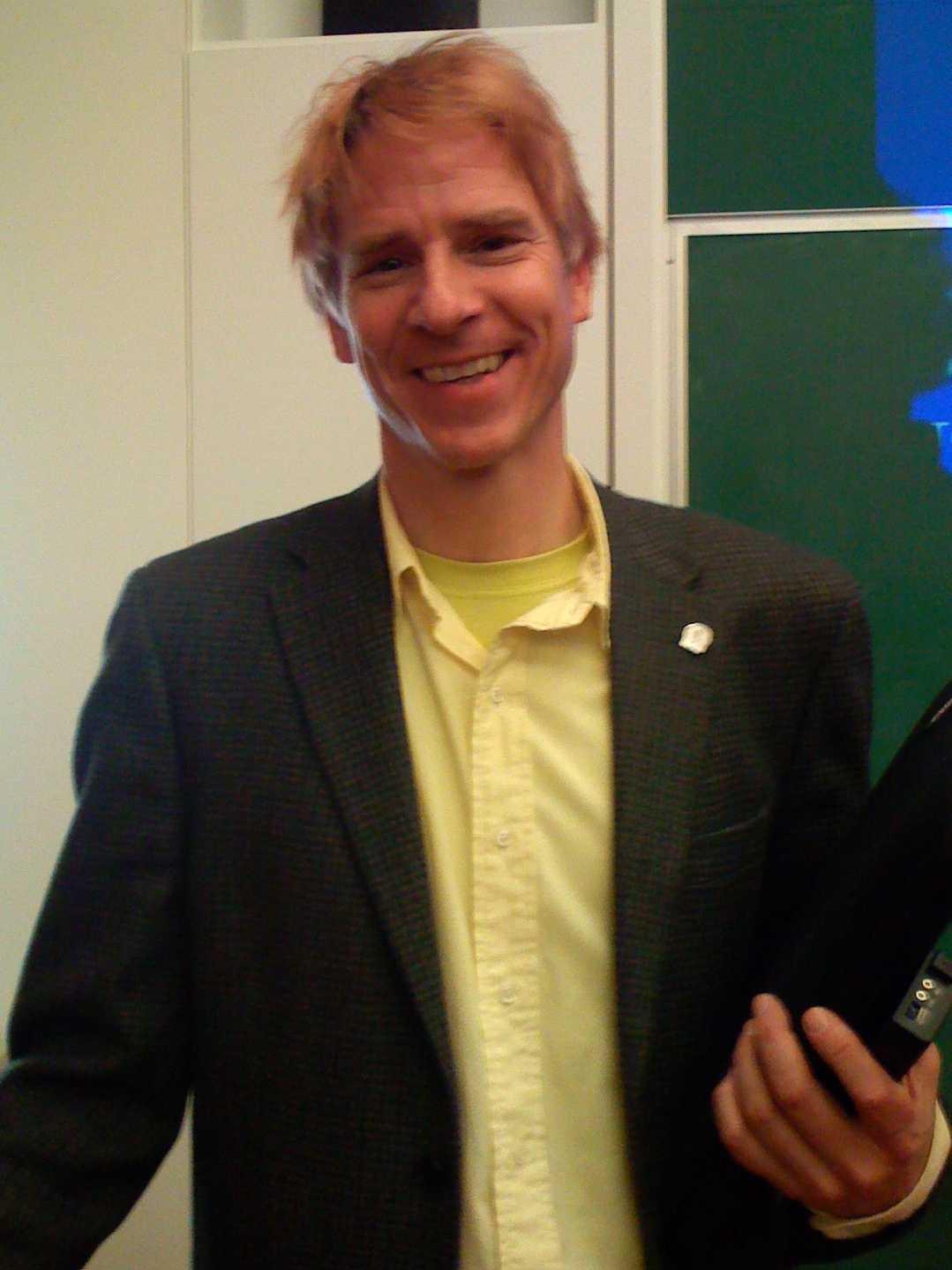
Christof Koch in 2008

Koch's primary collaborator in the endeavor of locating the neural correlates of consciousness was the molecular biologist turned neuroscientist, Francis Crick, starting with their first paper in 1990 and their last one, that Crick edited on the day of his death, July 24, 2004, on the relationship between the claustrum, a mysterious anatomical structure situated underneath the insular cortex, and consciousness.

Over the last decade, Koch has worked closely with the psychiatrist and neuroscientist Giulio Tononi. Koch advocates for a modern variant of panpsychism, the ancient philosophical belief that some form of consciousness can be found in all things. Tononi's Integrated Information Theory (IIT) of consciousness differs from classical panpsychism in that it only ascribes consciousness to things with some degree of irreducible cause-effect power, which could include the internet "Thus, its sheer number of components exceeds that of any one human brain. Whether or not the Internet today feels like something to itself is completely speculative. Still, it is certainly conceivable." but does not include "a bunch of disconnected neurons in a dish, a heap of sand, a galaxy of stars or a black hole," and by providing an analytical and empirically accessible framework for understanding experience and its mechanistic origins. He and Tononi claim that IIT is able to solve the problem in conceiving how one mind can be composed of an aggregate of "smaller" minds, known as the combination problem.

Koch writes a popular column, Consciousness Redux, for Scientific American Mind on scientific and popular topics pertaining to consciousness.

Koch co-founded the Methods in Computational Neuroscience summer course at the Marine Biological Laboratory in Woods Hole in 1988, the Neuromorphic Engineering summer school in Telluride, Colorado in 1994 and the Dynamic Brain summer course at the Friday Harbor Laboratories on San Juan Island in 2014. All three summer schools continue to be taught.

In early 2011, Koch became the chief scientist and the president of the Allen Institute for Brain Science, leading their ten-year project concerning high-throughput large-scale cortical coding. The mission is to understand the computations that lead from photons to behavior by observing and modeling the physical transformations of signals in the visual brain of behaving mice. The project seeks to catalogue all the building blocks (ca. 100 distinct cell types) of the then visual cortical regions and associated structures (thalamus, colliculus) and their dynamics. The scientists seek to know what the animal sees, how it thinks, and how it decides. They seek to map out the murine mind in a quantitative manner. The Allen Institute currently employs about 300 scientists, engineers, technologists and supporting personnel. The first eight years of this ten-year endeavor to build brain observatories were funded by a donation more than $500 million by Microsoft founder and philanthropist Paul G. Allen.

Koch is a proponent of the idea that consciousness is a fundamental property of complex nervous networks. In 2014, he published a short discussion work, In which I argue that consciousness is a fundamental property of complex things, where he introduced the concept that consciousness is a fundamental property of networked entities, and therefore cannot be derived from anything else, since it is a simple substance.

In 2023, Koch lost a 25-year bet to philosopher David Chalmers. Koch bet that the neural underpinnings of consciousness will be well-understood by 2023, while Chalmers bet the contrary. Upon losing, Koch gifted Chalmers a case of fine wine.

== Personal life ==
Koch is a vegetarian, a bicyclist, and an experienced rock climber.

== Publications ==
=== Books ===
- Methods in Neuronal Modeling: From Ions to Networks, MIT Press (1998), ISBN 0-262-11231-0
- Biophysics of Computation: Information Processing in Single Neurons, Oxford University Press (1999), ISBN 0-19-518199-9
- The Quest for Consciousness: A Neurobiological Approach, Roberts and Co., (2004), ISBN 0-9747077-0-8
- Consciousness: Confessions of a Romantic Reductionist, MIT Press (2012), ISBN 978-0-262-01749-7
- The Feeling of Life Itself: Why Consciousness Is Widespread but Can't Be Computed, MIT Press, (2019), 978-0-262-04281-9
- Then I Am Myself the World: What Consciousness Is and How to Expand It, Basic Books (2024), 978-1-5416-0280-9

=== Selected articles ===
- Poggio, Tomaso; Torre, Vincent; Koch, Christof (September 26, 1985). "Computational visional and regularization theory". Nature. 317 (6035): 314–319. Bibcode:1985Natur.317..314P. doi:10.1038/317314a0. PMID 2413361. S2CID 4346156.
- Rees, Geraint; Friston, Karl; Koch, Christof (July 2000). "A direct quantitative relationship between the functional properties of human and macaque V5". Nature Neuroscience. 3 (7): 716–723. doi:10.1038/76673. PMID 10862705. S2CID 205096823.
- Koch, Christof; Hepp, Klaus (March 29, 2006). "Quantum mechanics in the brain" (PDF). Nature. 440 (611): 611. Bibcode:2006Natur.440..611K. doi:10.1038/440611a. PMID 16572152. S2CID 5085015.
- Neven, Hartmut; Zalcman, Adam; Read, Peter; Kosik, Kenneth S.; van der Molen, Tjitse; Bouwmeester, Dirk; Bodnia, Eve; Turin, Luca; Koch, Christof (May 28, 2024). "Testing the Conjecture That Quantum Processes Create Conscious Experience". Entropy. 26 (6): 460. Bibcode:2024Entrp..26..460N. doi:10.3390/e26060460. ISSN 1099-4300. PMC 11203236. PMID 38920469.
