= Hans-Lukas Teuber =

German-American psychologist (1916–1977)

- Born: August 7, 1916; Berlin, German Empire
- Died: January 4, 1977 (aged 60); Virgin Islands
- Education: University of Basel; Harvard University
- Known for: Double dissociation, Corollary discharge hypothesis
- Spouse: Marianne Liepe
- Children: Andreas; Christopher

Hans-Lukas Teuber (August 7, 1916 – January 4, 1977) was a professor of psychology and head of the psychology department at Massachusetts Institute of Technology. He was one of the founders of neuropsychology and studied perception. He coined the term double dissociation. He also introduced the "Corollary Discharge" hypothesis. He gave the classic definition of agnosia as "a normal percept stripped of its meaning".

He was the recipient of the Karl Spencer Lashley Award in 1966.

== Biography ==
He was born in Berlin on August 7, 1916. He studied at the French College in Berlin and at the University of Basel in Switzerland (1935-1939). He immigrated to the United States in 1941 and in August of the same year married Marianne Liepe. In 1947, he earned his PhD in social psychology at Harvard University, under the mentorship of Gordon Allport. His thesis studied the efficacy of psychiatric treatments on delinquent adolescents. After graduating, his early work was in San Diego with neurologist Morris Bender.

While living in Dobbs Ferry, New York from 1946 to 1961, he headed the Psychophysiology Lab at the New York University-Bellevue Medical Center. His work focused on assessing brain injuries from World War II veterans, with a focus on the effects of frontal lobe injury. From this research, he introduced the "corollary discharge" hypothesis, which says that the frontal lobe is involved in the anticipation of movement.

In 1960, Teuber moved to Massachusetts to start a Department of Psychology at MIT after previous attempts had failed. Today, it is known as the Department of Brain and Cognitive Sciences. He hired Jerry Fodor, Thomas Bever, and Merrill Garrett. At MIT, he was one of the researchers who studied the case of H.M.

He died in a sailing accident in the Virgin Islands.
