= Partha Niyogi =

Computer scientist (1967–2010)

- Born: July 31, 1967; Kolkata, India
- Died: October 1, 2010 (aged 43); Chicago, Illinois, U.S.
- Education: Indian Institute of Technology; Massachusetts Institute of Technology
- Known for: Manifold learning, evolutionary linguistics, statistical learning theory, speech recognition
- Scientific career
- Fields: Computer science, statistics, artificial intelligence, machine learning, speech recognition, evolutionary linguistics
- Workplaces: University of Chicago; Bell Labs

Partha Niyogi (July 31, 1967 Kolkata – October 1, 2010 Chicago) was the Louis Block Professor in Computer Science and Statistics at the University of Chicago. He is known for his work in artificial intelligence, especially in the field of manifold learning and evolutionary linguistics. He wrote more than 90 academic publications and two books.

== Education and early career ==
Niyogi took his bachelor's degree at the Indian Institute of Technology and two graduate degrees at the Massachusetts Institute of Technology. His undergraduate thesis, recalled by his later colleague Stuart Kurtz, involved writing software capable of identifying the strokes of a tabla, an early sign of the interest in acoustics from which his research developed. He subsequently worked at Bell Laboratories before entering academia.

== University of Chicago ==
Niyogi joined the University of Chicago faculty in 2000. Kurtz, who chaired the Department of Computer Science at the time and was responsible for the appointment, later attributed the decision to Niyogi's record in speech recognition and statistical learning theory and to endorsements from senior figures in those fields. His promotion was comparatively rapid, and he was awarded an endowed chair in 2009, becoming the Louis Block Professor in Computer Science and Statistics.

In 2009 the department selected Niyogi as its next chairman. According to László Babai, the choice was effectively unanimous, reflecting a degree of trust across groups working in different areas of the department. Niyogi was diagnosed with cancer roughly a week after the appointment had been settled, and John Goldsmith, formerly chairman of the Department of Linguistics, took over as interim chairman that summer and then continued in the post.

== Research ==
Niyogi described his own field of interest as artificial intelligence in general and, more narrowly, the problems of pattern recognition and machine learning that arise when human speech and language are studied computationally. His published work, comprising dozens of single- and co-authored papers, spanned machine learning, speech recognition and language evolution, and he also held appointments in statistics and contributed to linguistics.

Babai characterised Niyogi's approach as the construction of new models rather than the application of established methods to established problems, an approach that also yielded results in theoretical computer science. Among the achievements Babai singled out was Niyogi's treatment of high-dimensional data sets through the observation that the data often lie on or close to a surface of lower dimension, a result with applications across a range of scientific disciplines. Babai further described him as "a one-person intellectual centre for half of the University", noting that the department regarded his interdisciplinary range as unusual. Niyogi presented a synthesis of his several lines of research in a departmental lecture in April 2010.

=== Language evolution ===
One strand of Niyogi's work on language evolution grew out of a talk given at Chicago in May 2005 by Mark Liberman, who had modelled how a speech community might converge on shared pronunciations. In the discussion that followed, Niyogi pointed to graph Laplacians and to the theory of coalescent processes as relevant mathematical tools. Three years later he sent Liberman a draft, written with Hariharan Narayanan, that generalised the model, established a number of theoretical properties of it and connected the problem to analogous phenomena in biology, the social sciences and physics. The authors framed the underlying question as how a group of linguistic agents – whether human, animal or machine – might settle on a common communication system through local interaction alone, with no central authority imposing uniformity.

== Illness and death ==
Niyogi's illness began around the middle of 2009, some fifteen months before his death. He died of brain cancer at his home in the Hyde Park neighbourhood of Chicago on 1 October 2010, at the age of 43. He was survived by his wife and two children, and a service in his memory was held on 30 October 2010 at Bond Chapel on the university campus.

== Notable work ==
- Laplacian eigenmaps
