= McGovern Institute for Brain Research =

Research institute within Massachusetts Institute of Technology

Coordinates: 42.362258°N 71.091652°W

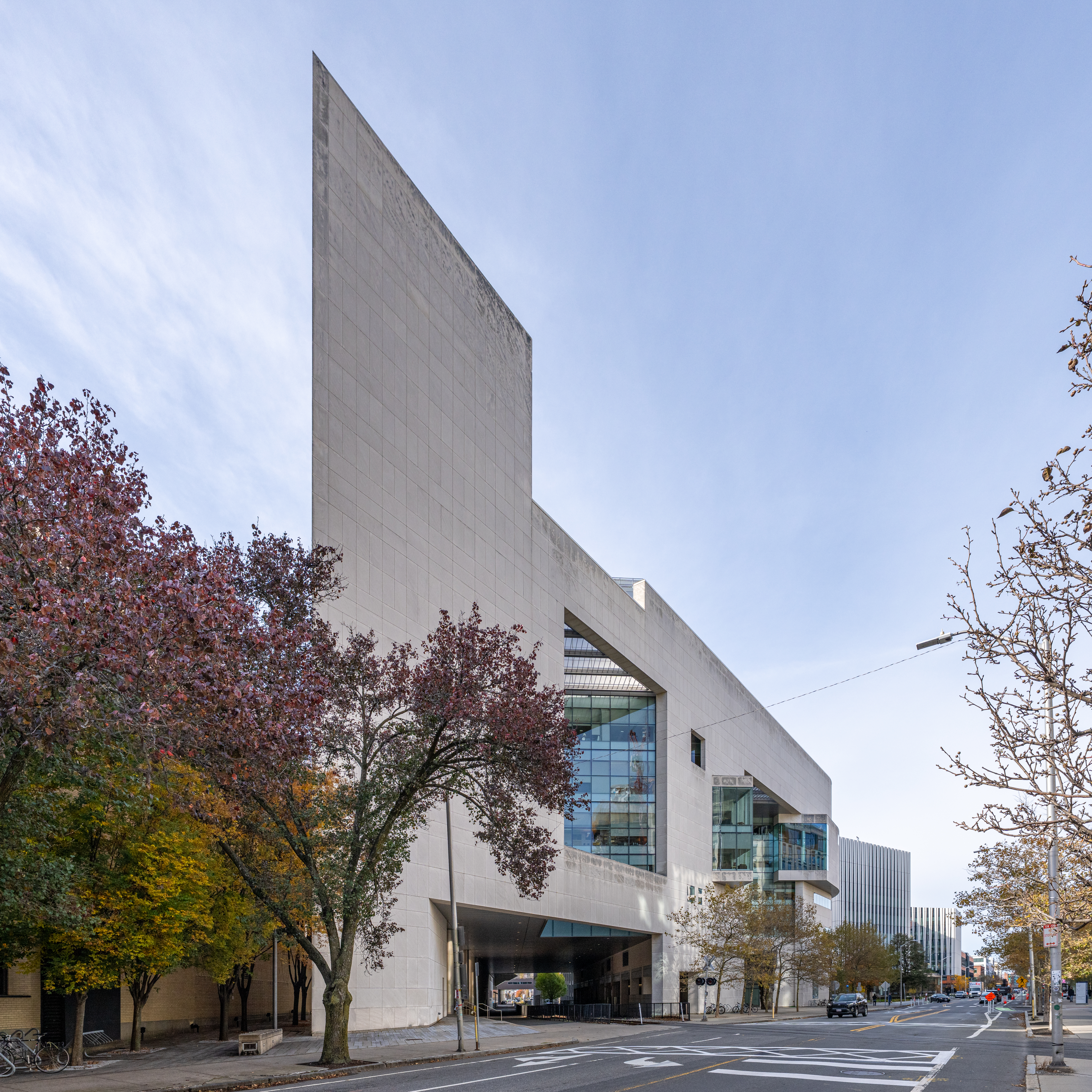
- Established: February 28, 2000; 26 years ago
- Field of research: Neuroscience
- Director: Robert Desimone
- Address: 43 Vassar Street; Cambridge, Massachusetts 02139; USA
- Location: Cambridge, Massachusetts, U.S.
- Operating agency: Massachusetts Institute of Technology
- Website: mcgovern.mit.edu

The McGovern Institute for Brain Research is a research institute within MIT. Its mission is to understand the brain and to apply that knowledge to improve human health and well-being. The institute was founded in 2000 by Patrick McGovern and Lore Harp McGovern with a gift to MIT that is expected to total $350M over 20 years. The institute conducts interdisciplinary research in basic neuroscience, neurotechnology, artificial intelligence, brain-body interactions, and therapeutics.

== History ==
The McGovern Institute for Brain Research was established at MIT on February 28, 2000, after MIT president Charles M. Vest announced the creation of the institute following a major philanthropic pledge from Patrick J. McGovern and Lore Harp McGovern. The institute was founded with the goal of advancing understanding of the human brain in both health and disease.

In the years that followed, the institute grew into one of MIT's main centers for neuroscience research. It later became housed in the Brain and Cognitive Sciences Complex, completed in 2005, alongside the Picower Institute for Learning and Memory and MIT's Department of Brain and Cognitive Sciences.

== Role ==
The McGovern Institute conducts research into all aspects of brain function, including perception, cognition and action. It also conducts clinical and translational research on a wide range of brain disorders.

The institute's core facilities include the Martinos Imaging Center, which provides neuroimaging technologies for human and animal research, including MRI, EEG and MEG.

The McGovern Institute occupies approximately 85,000 sq. ft. (net) within the MIT Brain and Cognitive Sciences Complex. This building, which was completed in 2005, also houses the Picower Institute for Learning and Memory and the Department of Brain and Cognitive Sciences, and is among the largest neuroscience research buildings in the world. The building was designed by Indian architect Charles Correa in collaboration with the Boston-based firm Goody, Clancy & Associates, Inc. It is one of the most distinctive landmarks on the MIT campus, notable especially for the Grand Junction railroad that runs through the center of the building.

== Faculty ==
Robert Desimone is the current director of the McGovern Institute and the Doris and Don Berkey Professor in the Department of Brain and Cognitive Sciences. Prior to joining the McGovern Institute in 2004, he was director of the Intramural Research Program at the National Institute for Mental Health, the largest mental health research center in the world. The 24 current faculty members include a Nobel laureate (H. Robert Horvitz), a winner of the U.S. National Medal of Science (Ann Graybiel), Ila Fiete and seven members of the US National Academy of Sciences (Desimone, Horvitz, Graybiel, Boyden, and Feng Zhang, along with Emilio Bizzi and Nancy Kanwisher). The founding director (2000–2004) was Phillip Sharp, also a Nobel laureate.

== Public art ==
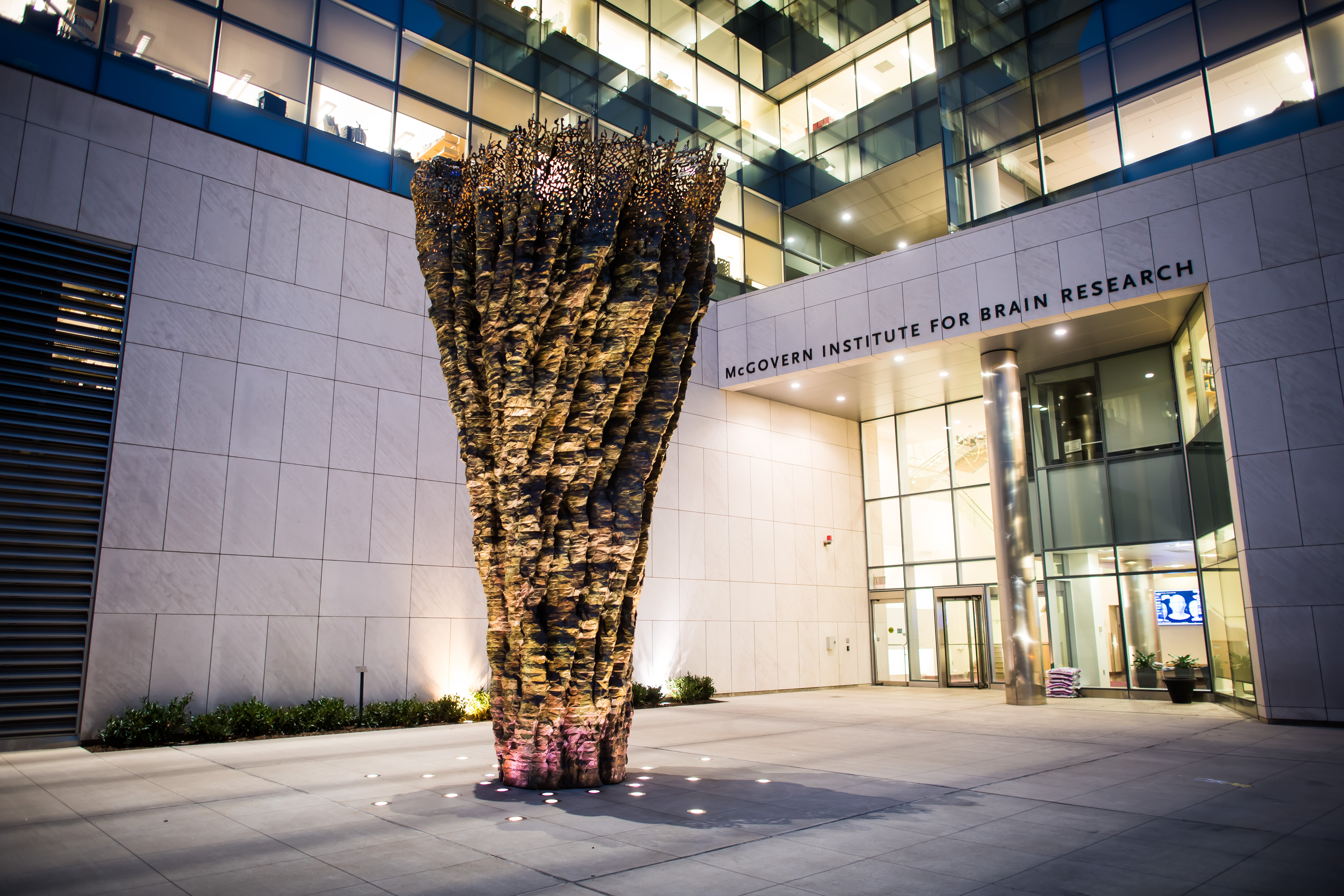
SCIENTIA

=== SCIENTIA ===
SCIENTIA by Ursula von Rydingsvard is a sculpture permanently on display in front of the McGovern Institute. It is MIT's 52nd piece of public art. The sculpture was commissioned by Lore Harp McGovern, co-founder of the McGovern Institute.

The sculpture is roughly 24 feet (7.3 m) tall and 17,000 pounds (7,700 kg). It was constructed out of bronze using sand casting and lost-wax casting.

=== Schwerpunkt ===
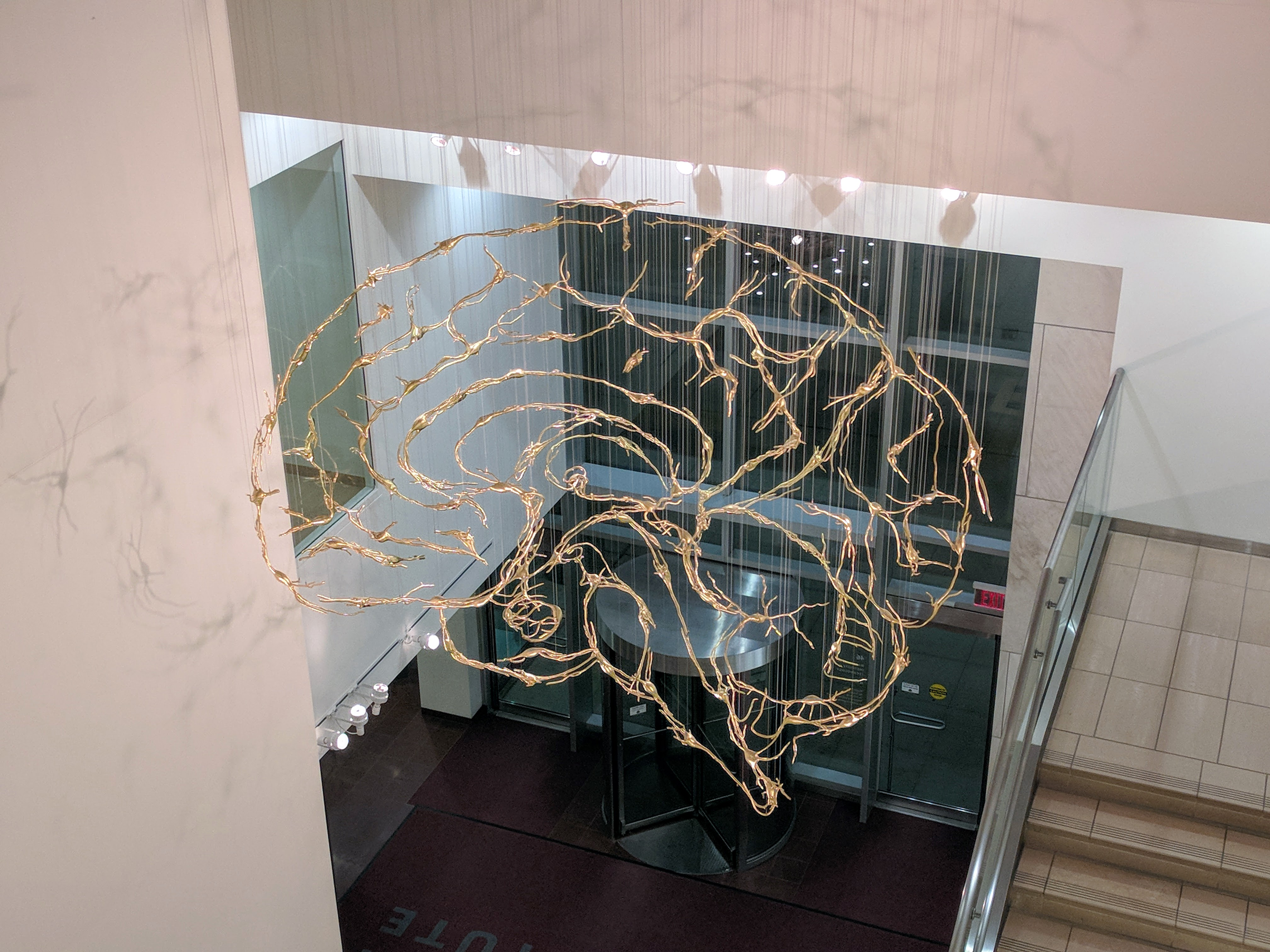
Schwerpunkt by Ralph Helmick

Schwerpunkt (German for "Center of mass or gravity") is a sculpture by Ralph Helmick. The sculpture consists of one hundred 3D printed metal neurons suspended above the McGovern Institute lobby. When viewed from a specific focal point on the building's third floor atrium, the neurons take on the shape of a human brain.
