= Lakshmi Pratury =

Co-host of TEDIndia

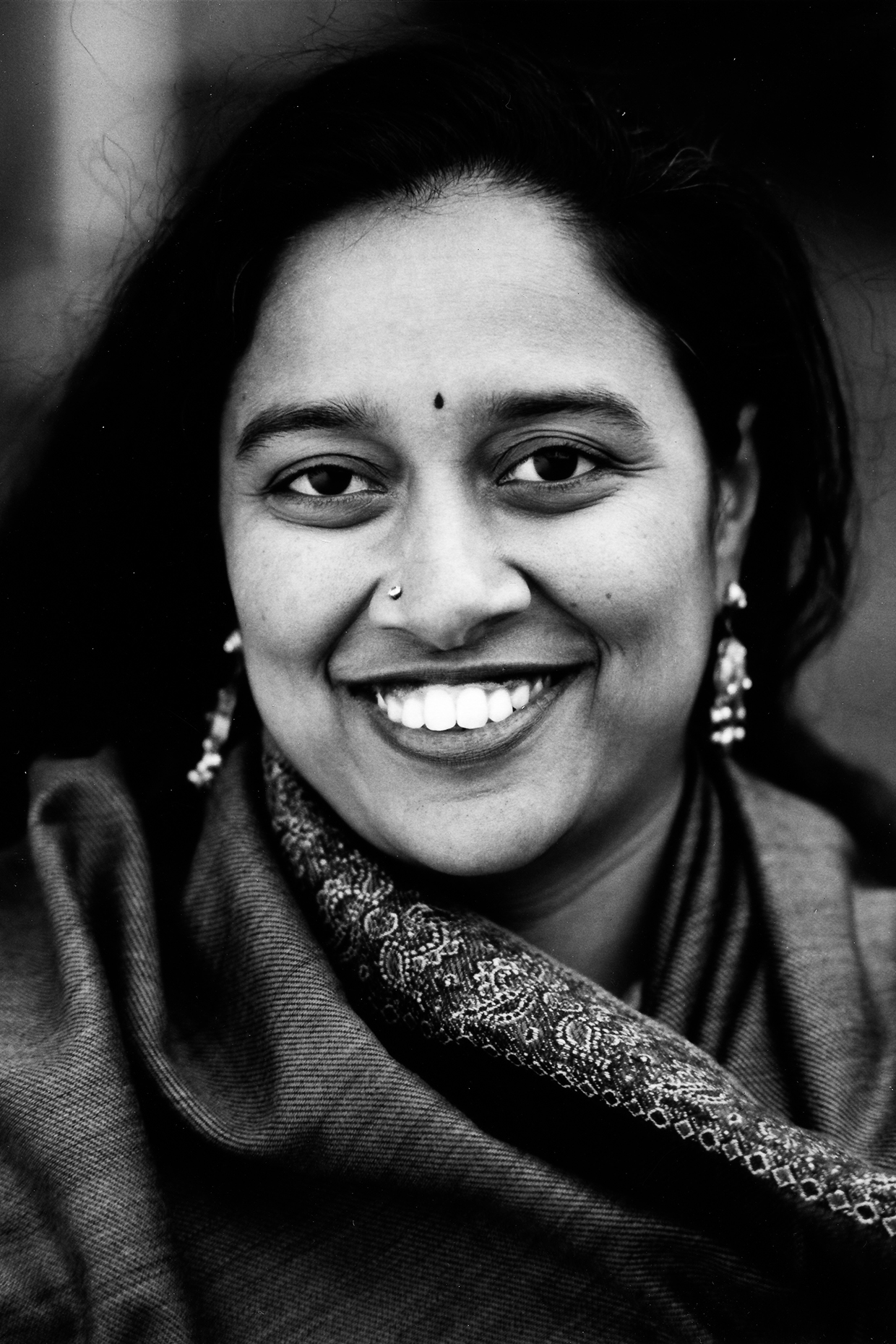
- Pratury in May 2013
- Occupations: Entrepreneur, Conference Host, Speaker
- Known for: INK Conference, INK Asia, SingularityU India Summit in association with INK

Lakshmi Pratury is an entrepreneur, curator, and speaker. She is the founder and CEO of INK. She also is the host and curator of live events and inktalks.com.

Lakshmi also serves as director of the SingularityU India Summit in association with INK, the first ever summit in Asia by Singularity University. She is the recipient of numerous awards and honors, including being named as "Inspirational Icon" at the Audi Ritz Awards in 2015 and being included in Forbes Magazine's 2010 list of "Women to Watch in Asia". Lakshmi has also spoken at conferences such as the TED conference in the US, the DLD Conference in Germany, and WIRED conference in UK.

Prior to this, Lakshmi spent two decades in the technology, venture capital, and non-profit industries in the US. She has lived in Hyderabad, Mumbai, Portland and the San Francisco Bay Area. She currently splits her time between Bangalore and the Bay Area.

== History ==
=== Life and career ===
Lakshmi was born in Visakhapatnam, India. She studied at the Nizam College of Osmania University in Hyderabad where she received a bachelor's degree and was awarded a gold medal in Mathematics as well as graduating at the top of her class. She went on to attend IIT Mumbai. She completed an MBA from the Bajaj Institute, India. She later earned a second MBA from Portland State University in Oregon. During this course of study, she minored in Theatre Arts.

Lakshmi worked at Intel in US for 12 years in the fields of finance, marketing, business development and strategy. She worked with software developers, media companies and content companies to develop strategic relationships with Intel. She was also part of the team that started Intel's investments into a larger technology ecosystem; this later evolved into Intel Capital. In 1999, she went on to join Global Catalyst Partners, a VC firm in Palo Alto, California where she focused on connecting India's software-development community with the US tech community.

She then moved to the America India Foundation (AIF) in 2000 and founded the AIF's Digital Equalizer program, offering technology education to approximately 80,000 children and 2,000 teachers across India. She also launched the AIF Summit to showcase social entrepreneurs and the annual AIF Gala Program to cultivate philanthropic giving by the Indian diaspora. Together with Anu Sethuram, Lakshmi founded a firm, Ixoraa Media, in 2005 "to create a bridge of intellectual exchange between India and the US". The pair's first project, Lakshmi's Lounge, highlighted the stories of "global doers" through interviews. The firm's next project was the Aamra Grove Conference, held in Napa Valley in 2007 and at Mohonk Mountain House, New York in 2008. This conference emphasized culture and personal experience and "brought together 50 of the world's most influential Indian leaders through conversation that explored the Indo-US corridor and re-imagined India's international presence".

=== Association with TED ===
A TED attendee herself since 1993, Lakshmi co-hosted TEDIndia in Mysore in 2009 along with Chris Anderson, the curator of the TED conference. She has compared this feeling to one of bringing your best friend home, and has stated:

The independence that Chris Anderson gave me to co-curate, identify the stories and interact with India opened my eyes to the stories that exist here and need to be told. It also showed the power of the stories — Pranav Mistry's talk is still very popular. Talks by people like Devdutt Pattanaik and Sunitha Krishnan catapulted them from being local intellectuals to being global personalities.

Nearly 1,000 attendees from 46 nations traveled to Mysore, India, for the conference, which featured speakers from a range of fields, as well as one hundred young TEDIndia Fellows. Following the enthusiastic response to TEDIndia, Lakshmi stayed in India and founded INK. In December 2010, Lakshmi curated and hosted the first INK Conference in Lavasa, India around the theme of "Untold Stories".

== INK ==
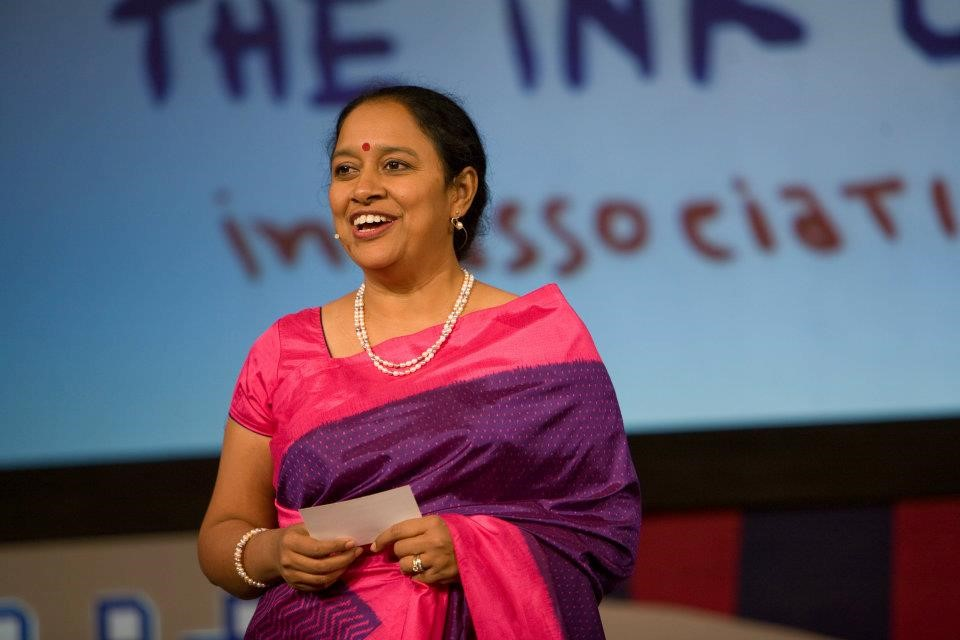
Lakshmi Pratury, founder and CEO of INK, speaking at INK Asia 2015 in Singapore

INK describes itself as "India's foremost platform for cutting-edge ideas and inspiring stories". INK is known for its events such as the annual INK Conference, INK Asia, and INK Salons. The organization has grown significantly over the years. As of February 2016, INK had conducted seven conferences (across multiple cities in India and abroad) and approximately 100 events; hosted 350 speakers and 70,000 attendees across these events; and received 20 million video views on inktalks.com and on various other social media platforms.

The 2015 INK Asia conference was a notable expansion for the organization because it was the first time a major INK event took place outside of India. This conference, held at the iconic Marina Bay Sands in Singapore with the theme of "Designing the Future", was created as a forum for business leaders, entrepreneurs and technologists to connect and collaborate with their counterparts.

Prominent speakers at previous INK conferences include:

- INK 2010: Hollywood filmmaker James Cameron who directed the blockbuster films Titanic and Avatar; visual data scientist Alexander Tsiaras; French designer Philippe Starck; and Indian activist Sunitha Krishnan, who works in the areas of anti-human trafficking, psychiatric rehabilitation and social policy.
- INK 2011: American film, opera and theatre director Julie Taymor; and Indian innovator Arunachalam Muruganantham, who designed, tested and implemented a sanitary napkin making machine for rural India.
- INK 2012: Cartoonist Matt Groening, who created the longest-running television comedy, The Simpsons; and Grammy Award winning graphic designer Stefan Sagmeister.
- INK 2013: Deep ocean explorer David Gallo; tech pioneer and MIT Media Lab director Joi Ito; and business executive Nikesh Arora, who is now president and CEO of Softbank.
- INK 2014: Mountaineer Arunima Sinha, the first female amputee to scale Mount Everest; and Pakistani filmmaker Sharmeen Obaid-Chinoy, who has won both Academy and Emmy awards for documentary films.
- INK Asia 2015: Iranian-American engineer Anousheh Ansari, the first female space tourist; and Swiss magician Marco Tempest, known for his multimedia magic and use of interactive technology and computer graphics in his illusions.
- INK 2015: Roboticist and surgeon Catherine Mohr; award-winning Indian actor Irrfan Khan; CEO of Epibone Nina Tandon; and American actor and director Josh Radnor, who portrayed Ted Mosby in the CBS sitcom How I Met Your Mother.

INK is a platform for innovation at the intersection of science, technology, community and culture. In a 2015 interview, Lakshmi stated: "We need to look at the new India with new eyes and focus on bringing digital access to everyone and cater to the needs of the youth in a whole new way. We need to give them a platform to shine and we need to listen to them more". Beyond live events, INK also serves as a community and has programs such as INK Fellows, an initiative started in 2010, which identifies young change-makers from different fields and provides them the support necessary to leverage their impact across the world. To date, 133 Fellows have been part of the program. INK states that it is "independent of TED, but values a continued warm relationship with the New York based TED organization".

=== Conferences curated and hosted/co-hosted by Lakshmi Pratury ===
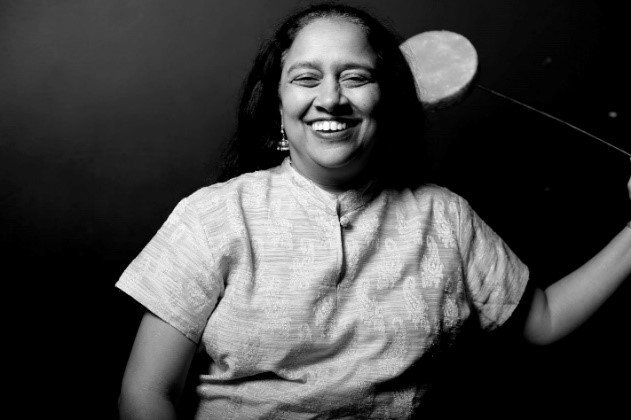
Lakshmi Pratury

- SingularityU India Summit in association with INK: 26-27 Feb 2016, Mumbai, India
- INK Conference 2015: "Disrupt", 16-18 Oct, Mumbai, India
- INK Asia 2015: "Designing the Future", 21 August, Singapore
- INK Conference 2014: "Beyond Boundaries", 31 Oct – 2 Nov, Mumbai, India
- INK Conference 2013: "All that Matters", 25-27 Oct, Kochi, India
- INK Conference 2012: "Designing the Future - NOW", 11-14 Dec, Pune, India
- INK Conference 2011: "Power of the Journey", 8-11 Dec, Jaipur, India
- INK Conference 2010: "Untold Stories", 9-10 Dec, Lavasa, India
- TED India 2009 (co-hosted): "The Future Beckons", 4-7 Nov, Mysore, India

=== Talks by Lakshmi Pratury ===
- Talk at TEDxBayArea 2013, SF, US.
- "Learn to Let go and Keep on" at TEDxTaipei 2013, Taiwan.
- "Remembering and Responding Online" at TED 2013, LA, US.
- "Understanding India" at DLD Conference 2012, Munich, Germany.
- "Moving into the Future while Taking the Traditions Along" at TEDxASB 2012, Mumbai, India.
- Talk at WIRED 2012, London, UK.
- Talk at DLD Women 2011, Munich, Germany.
- Talk at DLD Conference 2011, Munich, Germany.
- "What the West Can Learn from the East" at TEDxDanubia 2011, Budapest, Hungary.
- Talk at WIRED 2011, London UK.
- Talk at AdAsia 2011, New Delhi, India.
- Talk at ideaCity 2012, Toronto, Canada.
- Talk at TEDxNUS 2010, Singapore.
- "The Lost Art of Letter Writing" at TED 2007, California, US.

== Other projects ==
Lakshmi is the host and interviewer of Talk at 12 with Lakshmi Pratury, a show on Radio One, 94.3 FM in Bangalore, India. She has also published articles in the San Francisco Chronicle, the San Jose Mercury News and Mint. Furthermore, she has contributed to radio programming on National Public Radio; has been featured in a podcast on An Organic Conversation show on the Organic Media Network; and has acted in theatrical productions. Lakshmi was featured in the seventh anniversary issue of Vogue India in 2014, which was themed on women empowerment. She also appeared in the 2016 video "Hum Honge Kamyab", an initiative of Paper Boat which featured some of India's celebrated entrepreneurs and for Ford India, where she was featured along with Indian actor Farhan Akhtar.
