= Tsiaras =

Tsiaras is a surname. Notable people with the surname include:

- Alexander Tsiaras, American photographer, painter, and journalist
- Antonis Tsiaras (born 1993), Greek footballer
- Georgios Tsiaras (born 1982), Greek basketball player and manager
- Konstantinos Tsiaras (born 1966), Greek politician
