= Ric Edelman =

American businessman (born 1958)

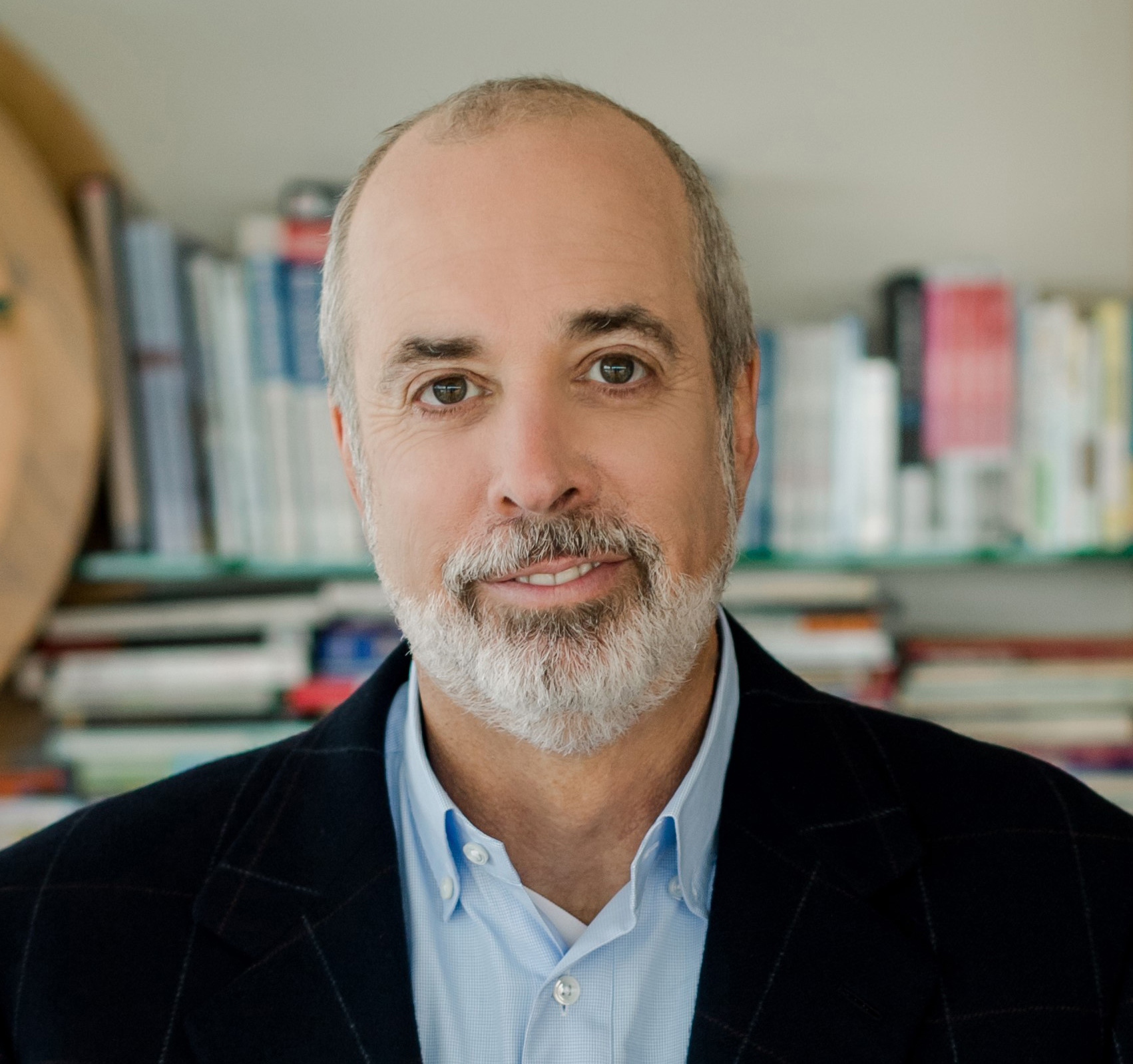
- Born: May 28, 1958 (age 68); Philadelphia, Pennsylvania
- Education: Rowan University
- Occupations: Financial advisor, media personality
- Television: The Truth About Money with Ric Edelman
- Spouse: Jean Edelman
- Website: www.edelmanfinancialengines.com/ric-edelman-radio

Fredric Mark "Ric" Edelman is an American investor and author. He is the founder of Edelman Financial Services (later, Edelman Financial Engines), the author of several personal finance books, and the host of a weekly personal finance talk radio show called The Ric Edelman Show. Edelman was also the host of the public television show The Truth About Money with Ric Edelman.

== Early life and education ==
Edelman grew up in Cherry Hill, New Jersey. He majored in communications at Rowan University (then Glassboro State College), where he met his wife Jean. He began his career as a reporter for McKnight Publications from 1980 to 1986.

== Business career ==
Ric and Jean Edelman co-founded Edelman Financial Services, a financial advisory firm, in 1986. Edelman sold a majority stake of Edelman Financial Services to Sanders Morris Harris Group in 2005. The group merged with Financial Engines to form Edelman Financial Engines in 2018. Ric Edelman sits on the board, where until June 2021 he oversaw financial education and client experience.

== Recognition ==
In July 2001, Edelman's book Ordinary People, Extraordinary Wealth appeared at #1 in the paperback "Advice, How-to and Miscellaneous" category of the New York Times Best Seller list. Barron's ranked Edelman the #1 Independent Financial Advisor in the United States in 2012. In 2019, Barron's added Edelman to its Financial Advisors Hall of Fame.

== Personal life ==
Jean and Ric Edelman founded the Edelman Nursing Career Development Center in partnership with Inova Health System in 2001, and donated $1 million to the program in 2008.

Rowan University renamed its creative arts school the Ric Edelman College of Communications & Creative Arts in February 2020 and named him a "Distinguished Lecturer". Edelman donated $25 million to Rowan for its Edelman Fossil Park and the development of a museum.

The museum funded by that gift, the Jean and Ric Edelman Fossil Park & Museum of Rowan University, opened to the public on March 29, 2025, in Mantua Township. The $73 million, 44,000-square-foot (4,100 m^{2}) museum stands on a 65-acre (26 ha) former marl quarry preserving fossils from 66 million years ago, is led by paleontologist Kenneth Lacovara, and is New Jersey's largest public net-zero facility.

== Books ==
- The Truth About Money with Ric Edelman (1997)
- The New Rules of Money (1998)
- Ordinary People, Extraordinary Wealth (2001)
- What You Need to Do Now (2001)
- Discover the Wealth Within You (2003)
- The Lies About Money (2007)
- Rescue Your Money (2009)
- The New Rules of Money (2010)
- The Truth About Retirement Plans and IRAs (2014)
- The Truth About Your Future (2017)
- The Squirrel Manifesto (2018), co-written with his wife Jean Edelman
- The Truth About Crypto (2022)
