= Nina Tandon =

Tissue engineering researcher

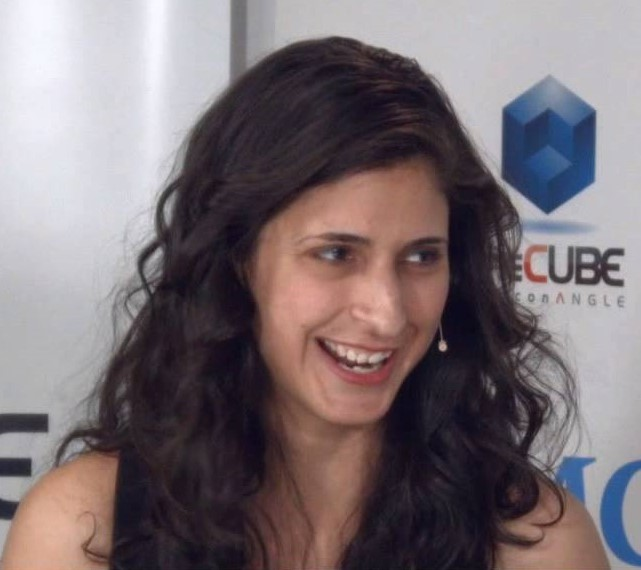
- Tandon in 2014
- Born: Nina Marie Tandon
- Education: MBA, Columbia University; PhD in Biomedical Engineering, Columbia University, 2009; MS in Electrical Engineering, MIT, 2006; Bachelor of Electrical Engineering, Cooper Union, 2001
- Occupations: Biomedical engineer; businessperson; author
- Title: CEO of EpiBone

Nina Marie Tandon is an American biomedical engineer. She is the CEO and co-founder of EpiBone. She is an adjunct professor of Electrical Engineering at Cooper Union and is a senior fellow at the Lab for Stem Cells and Tissue Engineering at Columbia. She was a 2011 TED Fellow and a 2012 senior TED Fellow.

== Personal life ==
Nina Tandon grew up on Roosevelt Island in New York City. She had one brother and two sisters. As a child, Tandon discovered an interest in science when she discovered her siblings suffered from eye conditions. She and her siblings were each encouraged to try various science experiments; Tandon's siblings also pursued careers in scientific fields. As a child, she enjoyed "taking apart TVs and building these giant Tinkertoy towers, playing with static electricity, and experimenting on [her] class for science fairs." She participated in puzzles and problem-solving, community theater, poetry, and sewing.

== Education ==
Nina Tandon attended college at Cooper Union, graduating with a Bachelor of Electrical Engineering in 2007. While completing her undergraduate education, she built an electronic musical instrument which is played through human bodies' electromagnetic waves. From 2003 to 2004, Tandon attended University of Rome Tor Vergata, having received a Fulbright scholarship. There, she worked on the development of LibraNose, analyzing "patient breath samples to determine the feasibility of a noninvasive cancer-smelling device." In 2006, she graduated from MIT with an MS in Electrical Engineering, having received a MIT Presidential Fellowship in 2004. In 2006, she started graduate work at the Boston School before changing to follow her mentor, Professor Gordana Vunjak-Novakovice. She then studied at Columbia University, graduating in 2009 with a PhD in Biomedical Engineering, with a concentration in Cardiac Tissue Engineering. At Columbia, she began creating human tissues. She also received an MBA from Columbia in 2012. She said that she wanted to bridge the gap between the possibilities of her research, and actually making them happen, and this is made possible with a business degree.

== Career ==
As a biomedical engineer, Tandon worked at Columbia University to force growth and stimulation of cells, using electrical currents. Currently, she has grown cells on rat hearts, to beat, but her ultimate goal is to have the ability to create a process where scientists can grow entire human organs.

== EpiBone ==
Tandon later co-founded EpiBone, and is the company's CEO. EpiBone's other co-founder and Chief Scientific Officer (CSO), Sarindr Bhumiratana had met Tandon during their doctoral studies, and by leveraging each other's educational backgrounds, EpiBone is on a mission to perform and use groundbreaking research to transform skeletal repair.

Currently, millions of bone graft surgeries are performed in the United States, albeit this procedure is in its primitive stages. The existing solution means doctors must perform a surgery that harvests a piece of bone from the patient and then another surgery that sets the graft in its new home. Not only is this procedure excruciating for the patient, but the risks of infection and graft rejection are a harsh reality.

The solution that EpiBone is currently working on would enable a human bone to be customized and grown in a laboratory from a patient's cells. In an interview with Bloomberg, Nina proposes the EpiBone solution for a unique reason: the EpiBone graft would not only fit the patient perfectly, but because it uses real cells, it can continue to remodel and grow with the patient. Nina proposes "a different view of the body, to view as a renewable resource of stem cells that can regenerate new parts as you need them." The technology at the heart of EpiBone is their proprietary "bioreactor," technology which simulates the intricate conditions and functions of the human body to allow the bone to grow in a way that will increase the chances of cell survival, differentiation, and maturation. The team then recreates the bone needed; this is what they call the 'scaffold,' the last step in the process is the infusion of human bone cells into the scaffold. Within three weeks, the bone graft is ready to be implanted into the patient. Nina's invention is crucial because it proposes not only a less risky solution but one that will transform the field of regenerative medicine, which has largely been focused on tissue regeneration.

EpiBone received Food and Drug Administration (FDA) approval in 2023 to begin testing its lab-grown bones in humans. This is a significant step forward, as EpiBone will be able to evaluate the effectiveness of its innovation and get real-life feedback from medical professionals and from the patient. This is EpiBone's second product to advance into clinical trials. Its first clinical trial is ending, where they used the patient's stem cells to grow bone grafts.

== Interests ==
Aside from her scientific research, Tandon has many other hobbies and interests such as metalworking, running marathons, and yoga. She started her career when she was hired by a telecommunications company, where she ended up doing customer service. Tandon worked at Avaya Labs, developing communications software before specializing in biomedical engineering. Her medical career was inspired by her siblings; her brother has an eye disease and struggles to see clearly, and both sisters have issues with seeing colors, thus changing our perceptions of the outside world. Her career was also inspired by her mother, who encouraged science from a very young age.

Tandon is also a TED Senior fellow, speaking there several times. She has long advocated for using biology as a tool to innovate, not just for scientists but for all. In one of her TED talks, she emphasizes that biology must be a consideration for all professions, whether you are passionate about art, sustainability, architecture, or clothing. Biology can be a technology partner for all and must be "taken off its miraculous pedestal and ask how it might be possible to utilize it in our work."

She has taught courses as an adjunct professor of electrical engineering at Cooper Union. Previously, she worked as an associate postdoctoral researcher for Stem Cells and Tissue Engineering Laboratory at Columbia University, where she attended school as well.

== Honors and awards ==
In 2011, she was named a TED Fellow. The following year, she was named a senior TED Fellow and one of Fast Company's Most Creative People of 2012. Tandon was a recipient of Marie Claire's Women on Top Awards in 2013. She was also named a Wired innovation fellow and a 2015 Global Thinker by Foreign Policy. L'Oréal Paris named her as one of its Women of Worth in the science and innovation category and Crains New York named her as part of its 40 Under 40 Class of 2015.
