= Kenneth Lacovara =

American paleontologist (born 1961)

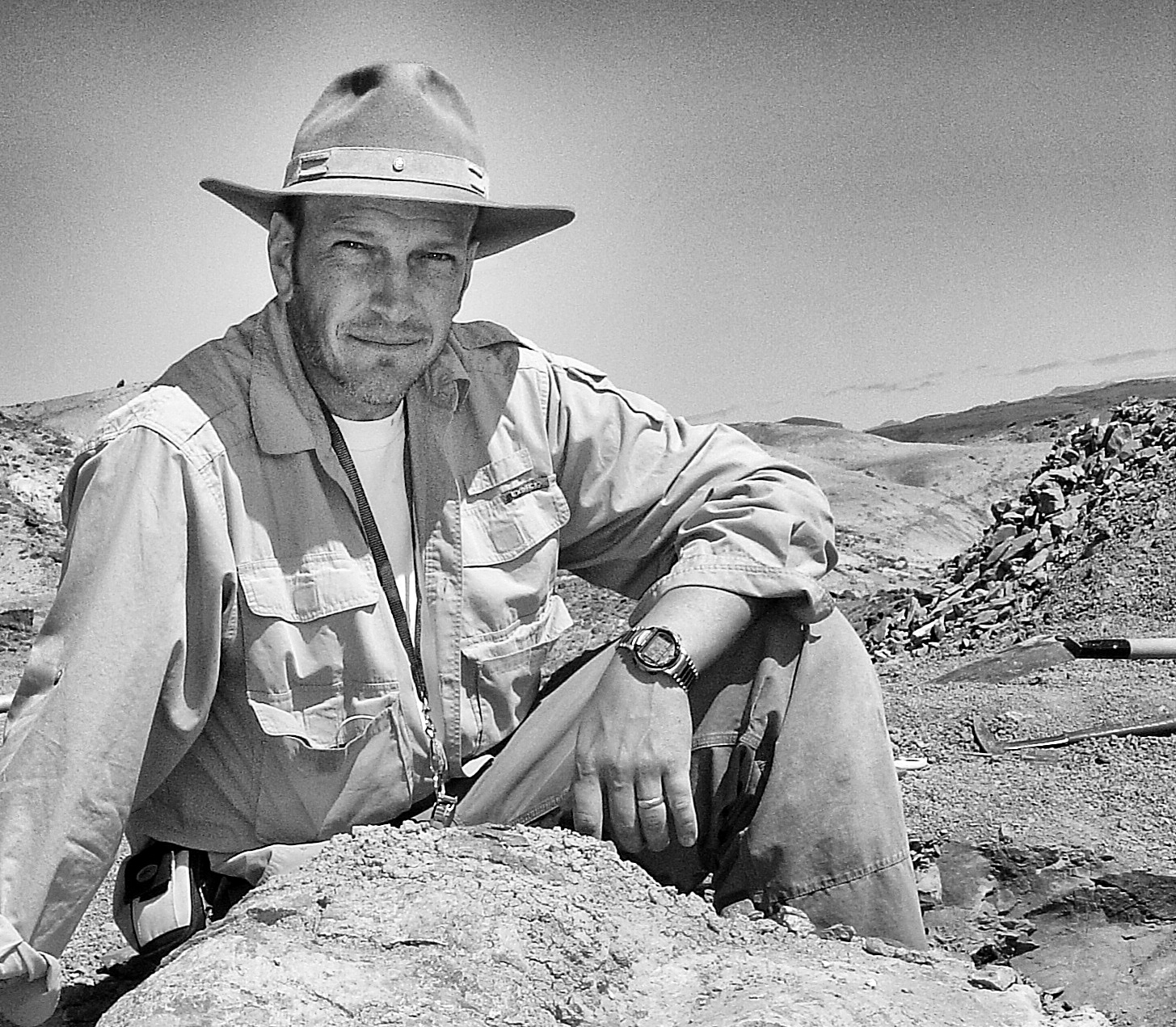
- Kenneth J. Lacovara with Dreadnoughtus femur
- Born: March 11, 1961 (age 65); New Jersey, USA
- Citizenship: United States of America
- Education: Rowan University
- Known for: Discovery of Dreadnoughtus schrani, Paralititan stromeri, and other dinosaurs and for founding the Edelman Fossil Park of Rowan University
- Awards: Explorers Club Medal
- Scientific career
- Fields: Paleontology
- Workplaces: Rowan University

Kenneth John Lacovara (born March 11, 1961) is an American paleontologist and geologist at Rowan University and fellow of the Explorers Club, known for the discovery of the titanosaurian dinosaur Dreadnoughtus and his involvement in the discovery and naming of the giant sauropod dinosaur Paralititan, as well as his work applying 3D printing technology to paleontology. Lacovara is founder and executive director of the Edelman Fossil Park of Rowan University and the author of the general-audience book, Why Dinosaurs Matter (2017), for which he received a Nautilus Book Award. Additionally, he serves on the Board of Scientific Advisors for Colossal Biosciences, a CRISPR-based de-extinction company that is endeavoring to bring back the woolly mammoth, and other extinct creatures. He is a recipient of the Explorers Club Medal, the highest honor bestowed by The Explorers Club.

== Biography ==
Lacovara grew up in Linwood, New Jersey and attended Mainland Regional High School. He graduated with honors from Rowan University in 1984. He was named Alumnus of the Year in 2002. He received a Master's degree in Physical Geography from the University of Maryland and a PhD in Geology from the University of Delaware in 1998.

Professor of paleontology and geology at Rowan University, he is former founding Dean of Rowan University's School of Earth & Environment and the founding Executive Director of the Jean & Ric Edelman Fossil Park & Museum of Rowan University. Formerly, Lacovara was a Professor of Biology at Drexel University in Philadelphia.

Discover Magazine has three times listed his work in the "Top 100 Science Stories" of the year, for 2001, 2012, and 2014. He was a speaker at the 2016 TED and INK conferences.

Lacovara is known for his work in applying high-tech tools to dinosaur paleontology, including 3D scanning and 3D printing, and robotics.

He is a resident of Swedesboro, New Jersey and a professional jazz drummer. In 1981, he marched with the Blue Devils Drum and Bugle Corps as a tenor drummer.

== Discoveries ==
On September 4, 2014, Lacovara's discovery of the giant titanosaur, Dreadnoughtus schrani, was published by the journal Scientific Reports, making international headlines. It is the most complete skeleton of a giant titanosaur discovered to date.

Lacovara was part of the team that discovered Paralititan stromeri in the Bahariya Oasis of Egypt in 2000. Paralititan was the first new dinosaur discovery in Egypt since the early 20th century and was featured in the 2-hour documentary The Lost Dinosaurs of Egypt, narrated by Matthew McConaughey and produced by Ann Druyan. The team published their findings in Science in 2001. The announcement of the new species was named by Discover Magazine as one of the "100 Top Science Stories of 2001".

In China, Lacovara was part of a team that discovered multiple skeletons of the Early Cretaceous (Aptian-Albian) aquatic bird Gansus yumenensis. Gansus filled an important gap in bird evolution, and the team published their result in Science in 2006.

Lacovara was also a member of the team that discovered Suzhousaurus megatherioides, a therizinosauroid from the Lower Cretaceous of the Gobi Desert of China.

== Jean & Ric Edelman Fossil Park & Museum of Rowan University ==
Lacovara is the founding Executive Director of the Jean & Ric Edelman Fossil Park & Museum of Rowan University, a 44,000 s.f. museum that sits on a 65-acre property in southern New Jersey that preserves a K/Pg bonebed of vertebrate fossils and serves as a site for STEM education and outreach. The museum opened to the public on March 29, 2025.

== Explorers Club Medal ==
In 2019 Lacovara received The Explorers Club's highest honor, the Explorers Club Medal, awarded for "extraordinary contributions directly in the field of exploration, scientific research, or to the welfare of humanity." Previous recipients include Roy Chapman Andrews, Neil Armstrong, Jane Goodall, Edward O. Wilson, and Neil deGrasse Tyson.

== Selected talks by Kenneth Lacovara ==
- La Ciudad de las Ideas, Puebla, Mexico - 2016
- INK, Goa, India - 2016
- TED Summit, Banff, Canada - 2016
- TED, Vancouver, Canada - 2016
- NASA New Horizons Flyby, Baltimore, USA - 2015
- TEDx Drexel, Philadelphia, USA - 2015
- Linda Hall Library of Science, Kansas City, USA - 2013
- iNatura, Dornbern, Austria - 2010
- Explorers Club Centennial Gala - 2004

== Publications ==
- Why Dinosaurs Matter. New York: Simon & Schuster/TED Books, 2017. ISBN 978-1501120107 - winner of a Nautilus Silver Book Award.
