= Edelman Fossil Park =

Public fossil dig site in New Jersey

Coordinates: 39.762°N 75.127°W

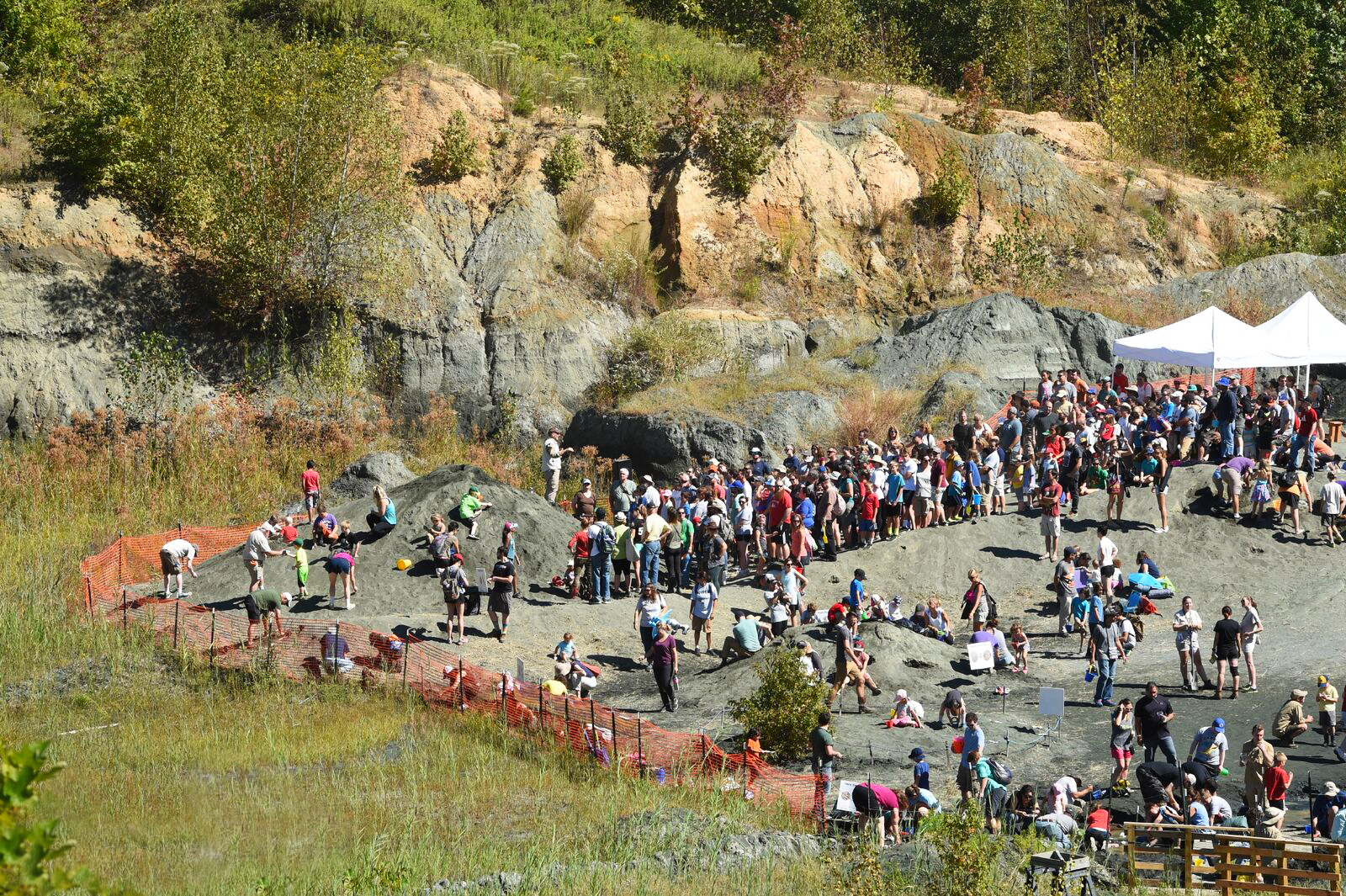
Edelman Fossil Park

The Edelman Fossil Park & Museum, located in Mantua Township, New Jersey, features a 66-million-year-old 6-inch (150 mm) bone bed set into a 65-acre (26 ha) former marl quarry. It is currently the only facility east of the Mississippi River that has an active open quarry for public Community Dig Days. Formed at the end of the Cretaceous Period during the Cretaceous-Paleogene extinction event, this rich fossil deposit is abundant in marine life which is indicative of the shallow sea that once covered the area that would become Southern New Jersey. The palaeontological site has been developed into a park and museum with public programs, which opened on March 29, 2025. Named after donors Jean and Ric Edelman, it is owned and operated by Rowan University in Glassboro, New Jersey.

== Geology ==
The bedrock of Gloucester County, where Edelman Fossil Park is located, is composed of alternating layers of sand, silt, and clay due to fluctuating sea levels since the Cretaceous. These sedimentary sequences are known as facies. Sedimentary rocks of this area have been dated from between the Lower Cretaceous to the Miocene (145 to 5.3 mya). The entire area of Southern New Jersey is known as the coastal plain. It was submerged under a shallow sea until the late Pliocene when the ocean receded as the Greenland ice sheet formed 3 million years ago. The Coastal Plain begins on a southeast diagonal between Carteret and Trenton with sediments overlapping the rockier Piedmont Formation to the northwest.

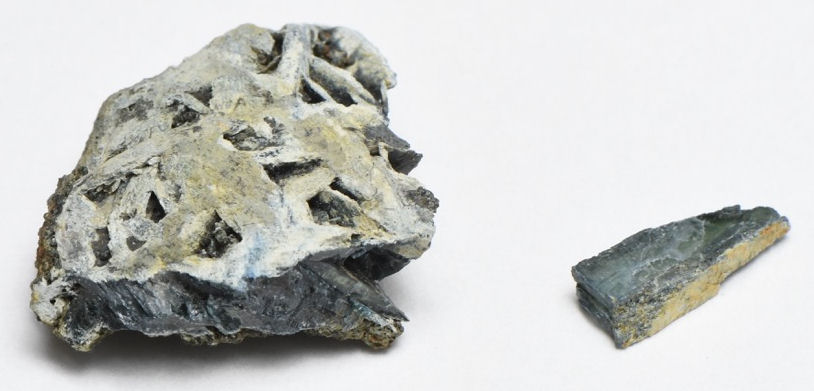
Vivianite from Edelman Fossil Park

The specific layer in which the fossils are located is known as marl, a dark to light green, manganese-rich, clay that forms when algae, aquatic plants, and aquatic animals decay over a long period in hard-water streams rich in calcium carbonate. This layer is typically located in swamps, resulting in a covering of a dark organic-rich layer of peat. Because of marl's formation as the result of decaying plants and algae in soft sediment, it is a great harborer of fossils including numerous invertebrates as well as larger land-dwelling animals whose bodies were swept downstream and laid here to rest.

Within marl sediments is the mineral vivianite (Fe^{2+}_{3}(PO_{4})_{2} · 8H_{2}O) that forms as a result of reduction-oxidation reactions. This deep blue to bluish-green crystal begins to oxidize in the presence of oxygen, converting Fe^{2+} to Fe^{3+} until the blue color becomes almost black and opaque. Because of this inevitable darkening, there is no such thing as stable vivianite. Embedded into these layers are also schist dropstones, indicative of the ancient glaciations that occurred in this area during glacial periods.

“This is something that I personally and lots of other paleontologists have been looking for all around the world,” said the museum's executive director Dr. Kenneth Lacovara, adding that he had sought such a layer in southern Patagonia, the foothills of the Himalayas and elsewhere. “And I found it behind the Lowe's in New Jersey,” he said.

== Site history ==
- 66 mya: Chicxulub asteroid crashes into earth off the coast of what is now the Yucatán Peninsula in Mexico, completely killing all dinosaurs (except those that evolved into modern birds), and three-quarters of all life on earth
- 1858: Just a few miles away from the Fossil Park in Haddonfield, NJ, the first complete dinosaur skeleton (a Hadrosaurus) to ever be mounted and exhibited is discovered
- 1866: Edward D. Cope discovers the tyrannosauroid, Dryptosaurus, one mile away from the Fossil Park site in Ceres Park
- 1920s: Operational quarry – The Inversand Company begins dredging the quarry for manganese greensand, sold as an organic fertilizer and water treatment product
- 1930s: Inversand workers uncover fossils in the quarry, and researchers are invited in to investigate alongside quarry workers
- 2008: Mantua Twp names forested land behind Lowe's on Woodbury-Glassboro Rd. part of a redevelopment zone
- 2012: Citizen Science – Dr. Kenneth Lacovara partners with Michelle Bruner (Mantua Township) to start "Community Dig Days", bringing almost 2,000 visitors per event to dig at the Fossil Park
- 2014: While at Drexel University, Dr. Lacovara describes the titanosaurian sauropod, Dreadnoughtus, which was unearthed in Argentina
- 2014: Dr. Kenneth Lacovara meets with Rowan University president, Dr. Ali A. Houshmand about purchasing the Inversand quarry - he agrees with the premise that Dr. Lacovara would serve as the Fossil Park's Executive Director and Founding Dean of the newly created School of Earth & Environment at Rowan University
- 2015: Inversand ceases operations at the quarry due to the high cost of pumping water out of the quarry
- 2015: Inversand site purchased by Rowan University from the Inversand Company for $1.95 million
- 2015: Rowan University forms School of Earth & Environment, hiring Founding Dean Dr. Kenneth Lacovara
- 2016: Jean and Ric Edelman pledge $25 million toward the preservation and expansion of the Fossil Park, with plans to build a museum and science education facility
- 2017: Jean and Ric Edelman deemed conditional redevelopers of the land parcel owned by Mantua Twp
- 2019: Edelman Financial Services purchase a 40-acre wooded plot adjacent to fossil park from Mantua Township for $655,000
- 2021: Groundbreaking of the $73 million Edelman Fossil Park & Museum of Rowan University
- 2025: Opening of Edelman Fossil Park & Museum

== Species of interest ==
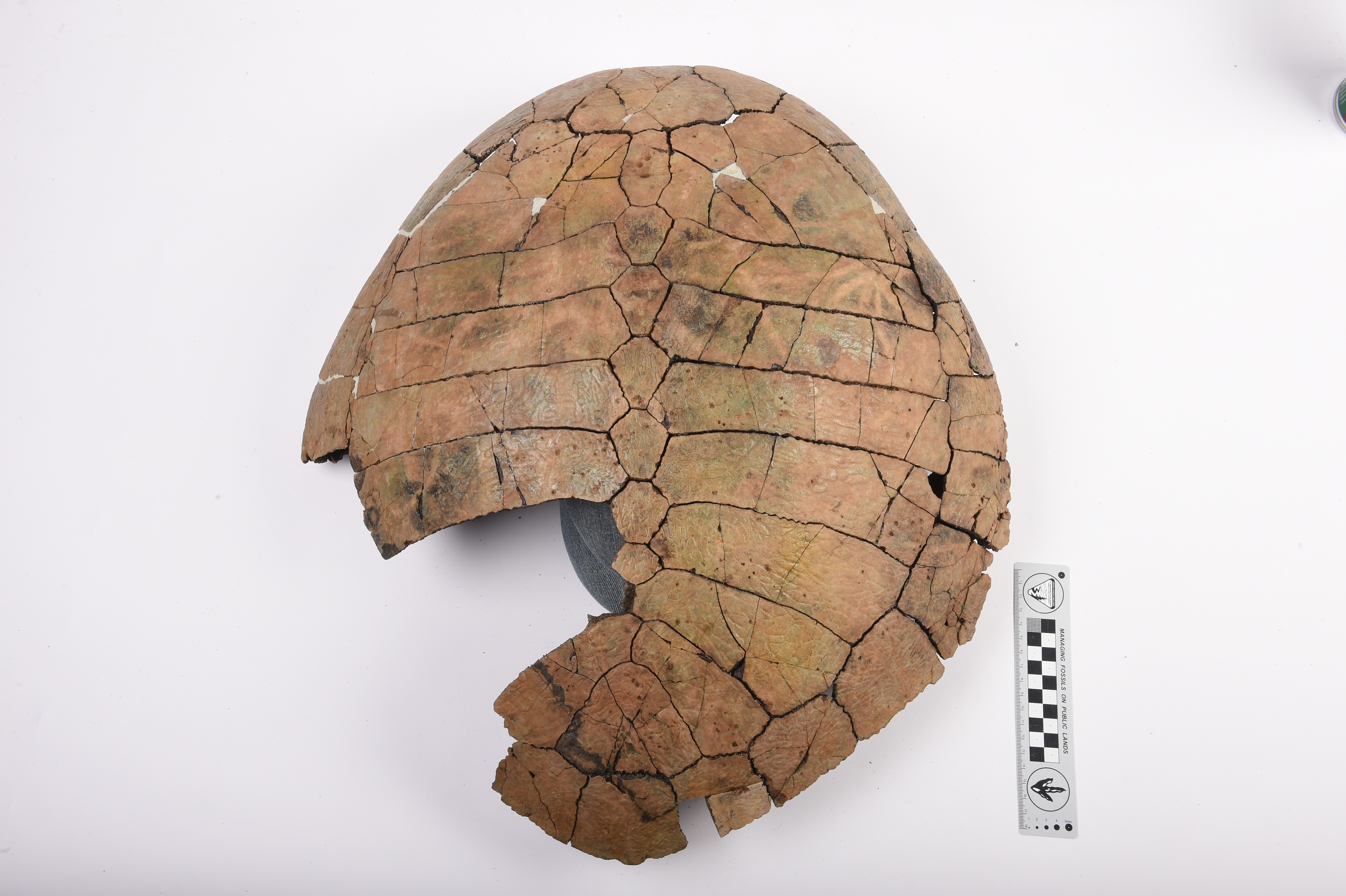
Taphrosphys sulcatus carapace fossil from Edelman Fossil Park

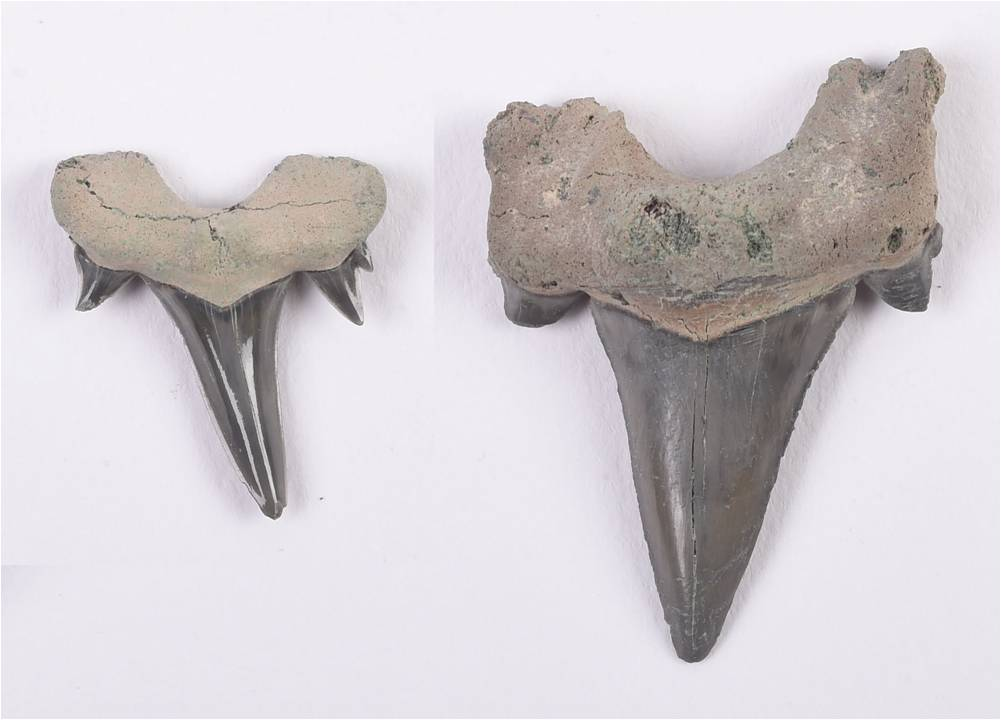
Cretolamna fossil from Edelman Fossil Park

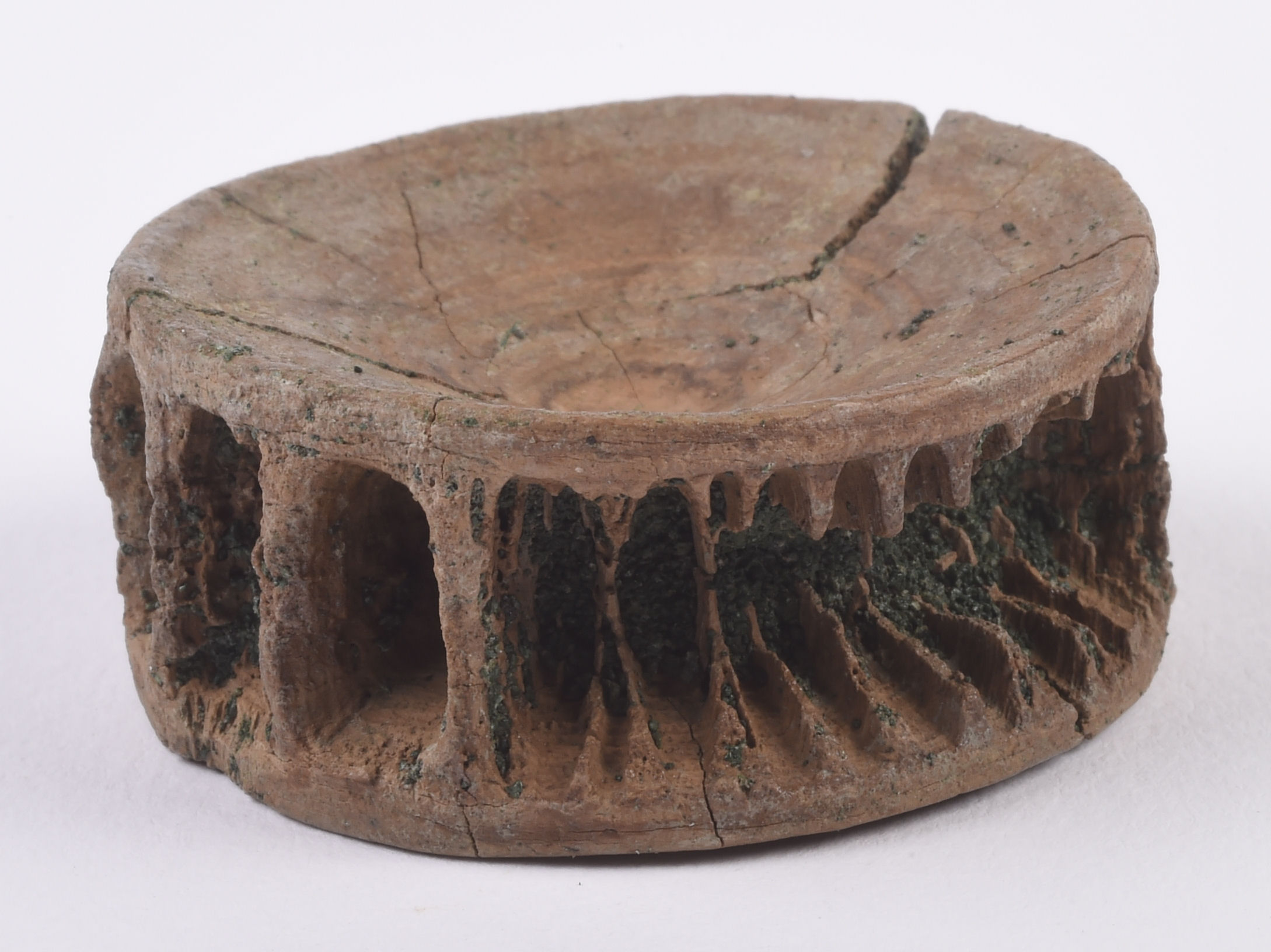
Shark vertebra fossil from Edelman Fossil Park

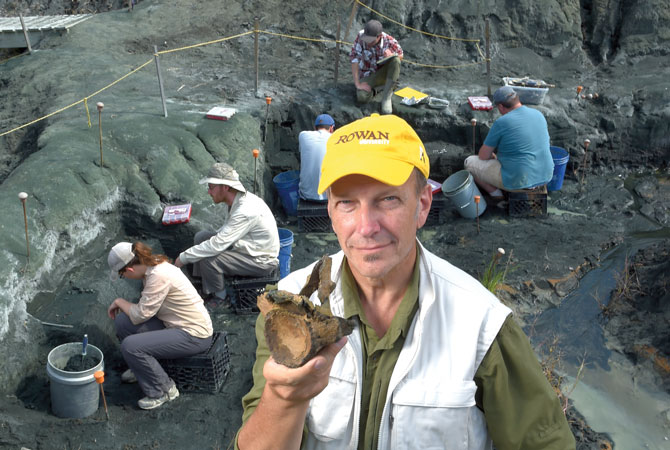
Dr. Lacovara with a Mosasaur vertebra found by Dr. Zachary Boles

The following are some of the fossils that have been found on the site at the Edelman Fossil Park, most of which are extinct species. An asterisk (*) indicates an extant, or living, species.

=== Sea turtles and aquatic turtles ===
- Taphrosphys sulcatus
- Catapleura repanda
- Euclastes wielandi
- Bothremys sp.

=== Cartilaginous fish ===
- Odontaspis cuspidata (Sand Tiger Shark)
- Palaeocarcharodon orientalis (Pygmy White Shark)
- Squalicorax pristodontus (Crow Shark)
- Otodus obliquus (early Mackerel Shark)
- Cretalamna appendiculata (early Mackerel Shark)
- Squatina squatina (Angelshark)*
- Notidanodon (early Cow Shark)
- Edaphodon (Ratfish)*
- Ischyodus thurmanni (Chimaera)
- sp. (Stingray)
- Myliobatis leidyi (Eagle Ray)*
- Rhombodus levis (ray)

=== Bony fish ===
- Acipenser albertensis (Sturgeon)
- Enchodus ferox (Saber Toothed Herring)

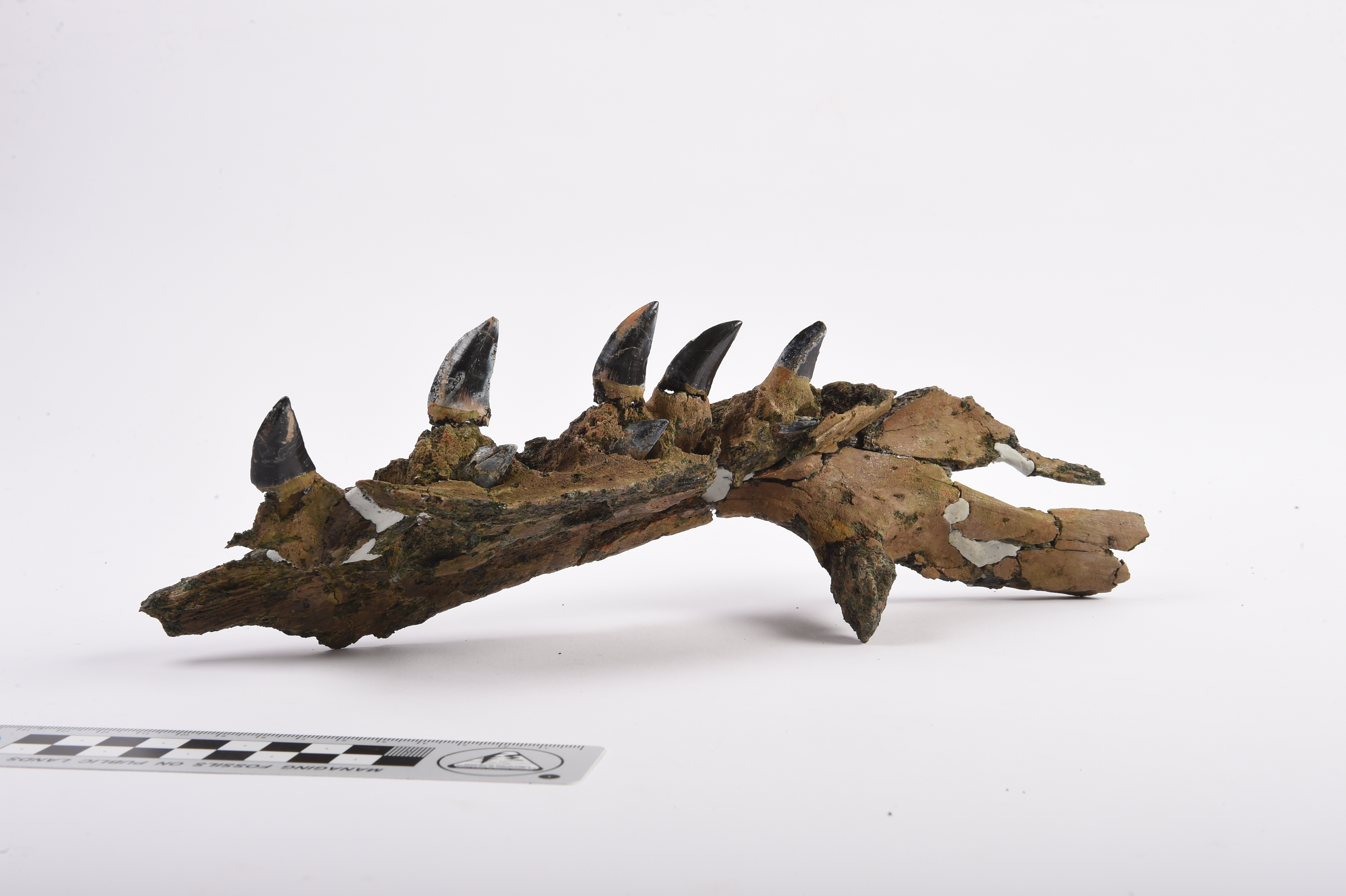
Mosasaur palate fossil from Edelman Fossil Park

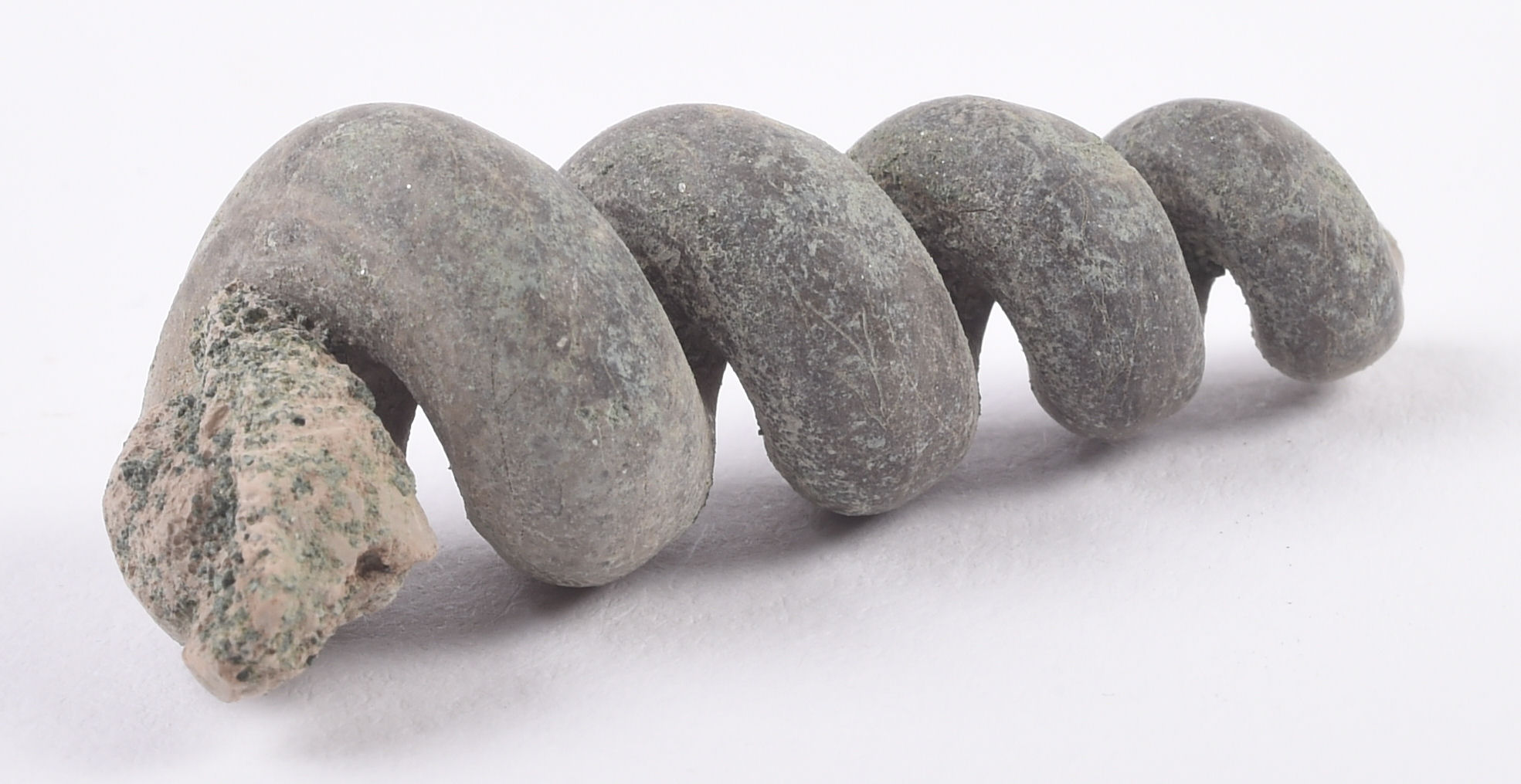
Turritella fossil from Edelman Fossil Park

=== Crocodiles ===
- Thoracosaurus neocesariensis (Crocodylomorph)
- Borealosuchus threeensis (Boreal Crocodile)
- Hyposaurus rogersii (Hyposaurus Crocodylomorph)
- Bottosaurus (Alligatoroid)

=== Mosasaurs ===
- Mosasaurus sp.

=== Invertebrates ===
- Sphenodiscus (Ammonite)
- Pachydiscus (Ammonite)
- Peridonella dichotoma (sponge)
- Cliona cretacea (sponge)
- Flabellum mortoni (coral)
- Oleneothyris harlani (brachiopod)
- Caryatis veta (brachiopod)
- Liopistha protexta (brachiopod)
- Gryphaeostrea vomer
- Nuculana stephensoni (clam)
- Cuculleae vulgaris (False Ark Shell)*
- Agerostrea nasuta (oyster)
- Pycnodonte dissimilaris (oyster)*
- Eutrephoceras dekayi (nautilus)
- Baculites (Walking Stick Rock)
- Gyrodes abyssinus (Gyrodes - snail)
- Pyropsis trochiformis (snail)
- Turbinopsis curta (snail)
- Turritella vertebroides (Turritella - sea snail)

== Museum ==
Key stakeholders at the Jean and Ric Edelman Fossil Park at Rowan University broke ground on a $73 million new endeavor on October 9, 2021 – The Jean and Ric Edelman Fossil Park & Museum. It opened on March 29, 2025, and anticipates 200,000 visitors per year. Visitors to the museum are transported to the moments surrounding Earth's fifth mass extinction: the moments that led to a mass die-off when non-avian dinosaurs and 75% of all other species went extinct.

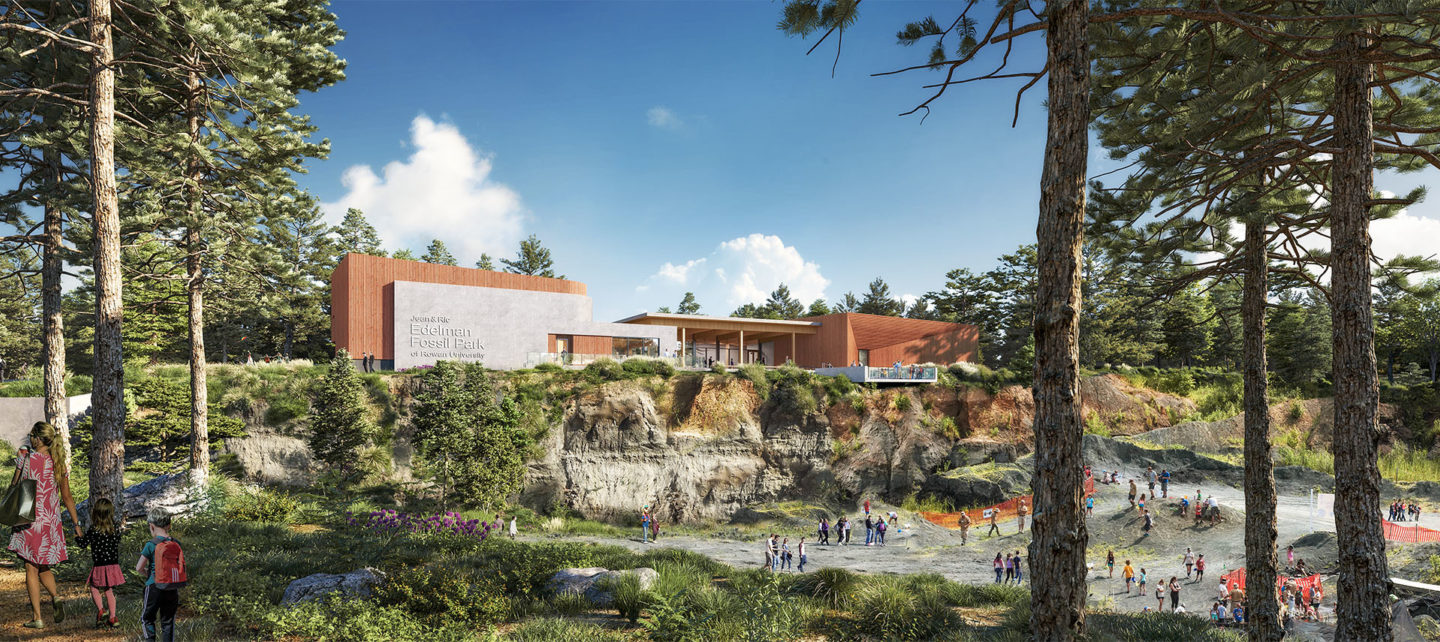
Edelman Fossil Park Museum (rendering)

Guests are immersed in the world of the Late Cretaceous as it looked in coastal New Jersey, alongside both land-dwelling and aquatic creatures. The 44,000 square foot museum features interactive, hands-on learning stations, exploration zones, and a paleo-themed playground. Elsewhere, the Hall of Extinction & Hope helps visitors understand what led to the dinosaurs' demise as well as what we can learn and do about our current climate and biodiversity crises. Additionally, a Fossil Research Workshop, virtual reality chamber, fossil dig experience, cafe, and gift shop are available.

=== Sustainability ===
The Edelman Fossil Park Museum is New Jersey's largest public net-zero facility, with 100% of its energy coming from a combination of green energy available in New Jersey's power grid and renewable energy produced on-site. The museum features geothermal water-source heat pump heating and cooling systems, a photovoltaic solar field, and the repurposing of on-site materials for interior construction and design. No fossil fuels are combusted for museum operations and no greenhouse gases are released into the atmosphere. The surrounding grounds utilize native plantings, and plant and animal habitats and other key landscape features are restored as part of the design footprint.
