= Dreadnoughtus =

Dreadnoughtus Temporal range: Late Cretaceous (Campanian–Maastrichtian), 76–70 Ma
- Skeletal restoration showing known elements

Scientific classification
- Kingdom: Animalia
- Phylum: Chordata
- Class: Reptilia
- Clade: Dinosauria
- Clade: Saurischia
- Clade: †Sauropodomorpha
- Clade: †Sauropoda
- Clade: †Eusauropoda
- Clade: †Macronaria
- Clade: †Titanosauria
- Clade: †Lithostrotia
- Genus: †Dreadnoughtus; Lacovara et al., 2014
- Species: †D. schrani

Binomial name
- †Dreadnoughtus schrani Lacovara et al., 2014

Extinct genus of dinosaur

Dreadnoughtus is a genus of titanosaurian sauropod dinosaur containing a single species, Dreadnoughtus schrani. It is known from two partial skeletons discovered in Upper Cretaceous (Campanian to Maastrichtian, approximately 76–70 million years ago) rocks of the Cerro Fortaleza Formation in Santa Cruz Province, Argentina. It is one of the largest terrestrial vertebrates known from reasonably complete remains, with the immature type specimen measuring 26 metres (85 ft) in total body length and weighing up to 48–49 metric tons (53–54 short tons).

Dreadnoughtus is known from more complete skeletons than any other gigantic titanosaurian. Drexel University paleontologist Kenneth Lacovara, who discovered the genus, chose the name Dreadnoughtus, which means "fears nothing", stating "I think it's time the herbivores get their due for being the toughest creatures in an environment." Specifically, the name was inspired by the dreadnought, an extremely influential early 20th-century battleship type, known for revolutionarily outclassing (and thus supposedly never needing to fear) the smaller, weaker battleships that came before.

== Discovery and study ==
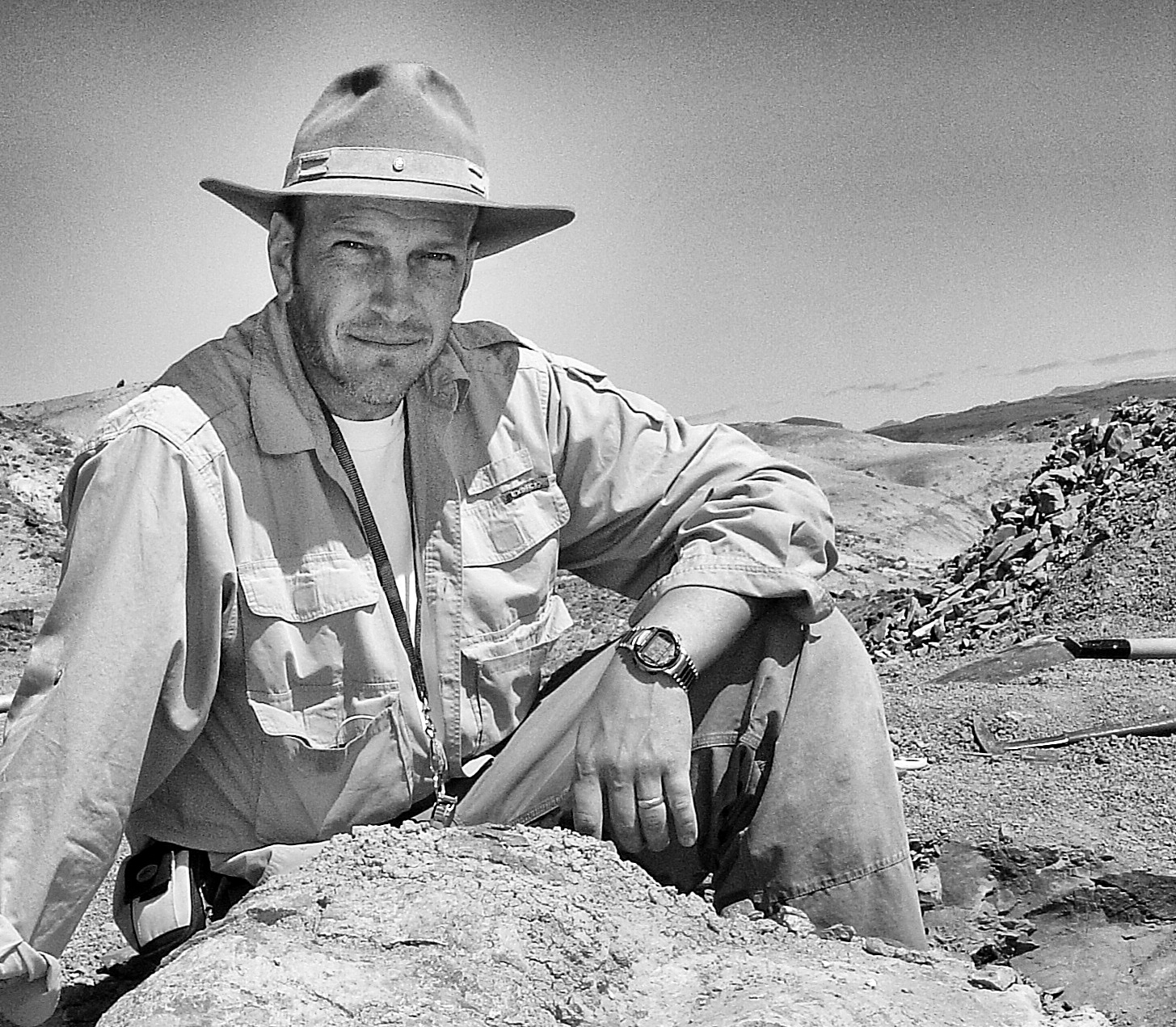
Discoverer Kenneth Lacovara with a femur during excavation in 2005

American palaeontologist Kenneth Lacovara discovered the remains in the Cerro Fortaleza Formation in Santa Cruz Province, Patagonia, Argentina in 2005. Due to the large size of the bones and the remote location where they were found, it took his team four austral summers to fully excavate the remains. Mules, ropes and many team members were needed to finally get the field-jacketed bones to a truck.

In 2009, the fossils were transported to Philadelphia via an ocean freighter for preparation and study. Fossil preparation and analysis occurred at Drexel University, the Academy of Natural Sciences of Drexel University and the Carnegie Museum of Natural History. Dreadnoughtus schrani fossils were returned to their permanent repository at the Museo Padre Molina in Rio Gallegos, Argentina in March 2015.

The bones of both Dreadnoughtus specimens were scanned with a NextEngine 3D laser scanner. Using the software Autodesk Maya, the scans of each bone were positioned in 3D space to create a digital articulated skeleton, which was then converted into 3D PDF files using the software GeoMagic. The high fidelity of these scans allowed Lacovara et al. (2014) to study the heavy fossils of Dreadnoughtus schrani in a way that was safe for the fossils and enhanced virtual and long-distance collaboration.

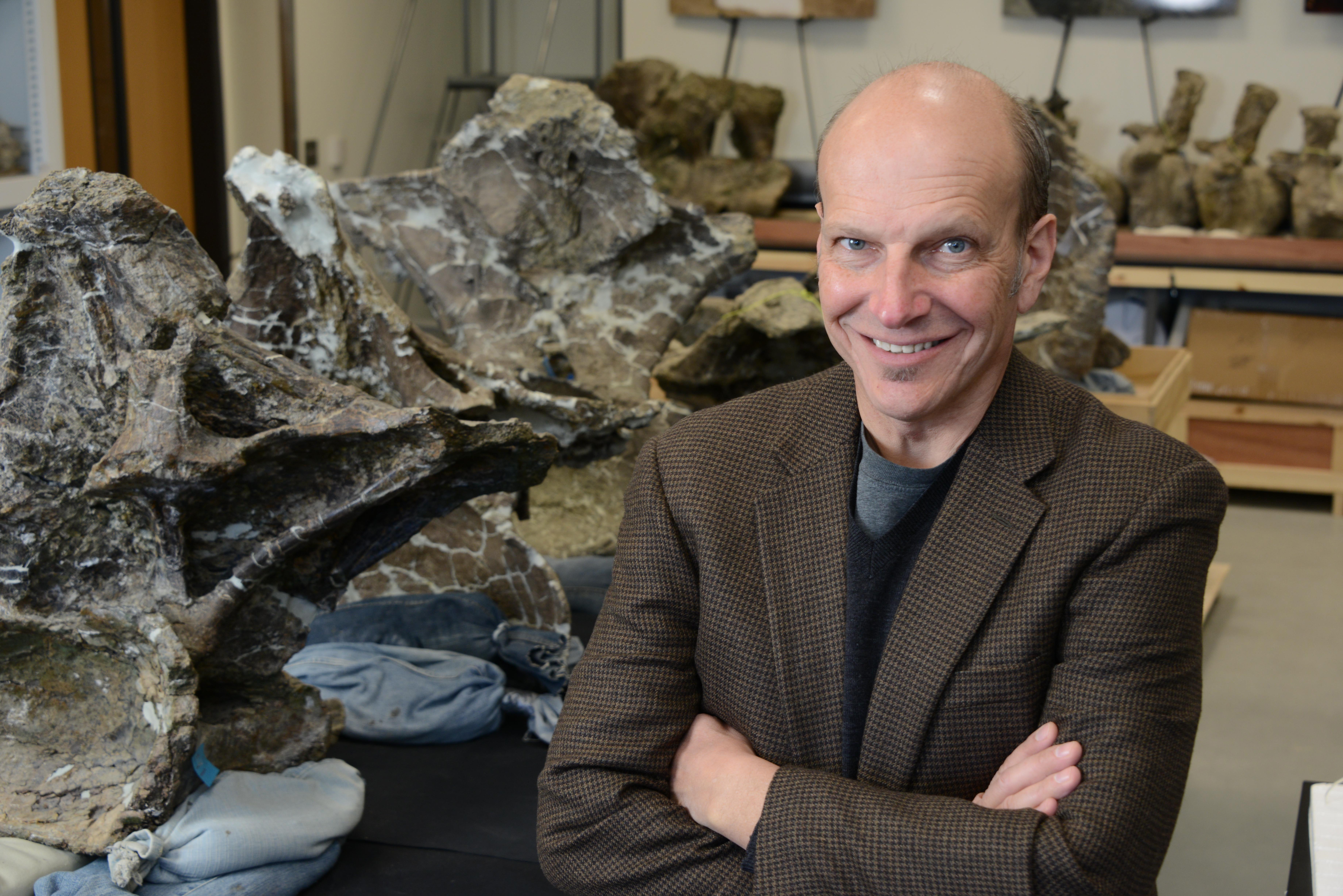
Lacovara with the holotype in his laboratory in 2012

The holotype specimen, MPM-PV 1156, consists of a partial skeleton, somewhat preserved in its original layout, that comprises: a maxilla (jaw) fragment; a tooth; a posterior cervical vertebra; cervical ribs; multiple dorsal vertebrae and dorsal ribs; the sacrum; 32 caudal vertebrae and 18 haemal arches (bones from the tail) that include a sequence of 17 anterior and middle caudal vertebrae and their corresponding haemal arches found in their original layout; the left pectoral girdle and forelimb minus the front foot; both sternal plates; all pelvic elements; the left hind limb lacking a hind foot and right tibia; metatarsals I and II; and one claw from digit I.

The paratype, MPM-PV 3546, consists of a partially articulated postcranial skeleton of a slightly smaller individual whose remains were discovered in the same location as the holotype. It includes a partial anterior cervical vertebra, multiple dorsal vertebrae and ribs, the sacrum, seven caudal vertebrae and five haemal arches, a nearly complete pelvis, and the left femur.

According to the research team that discovered the taxon, including notably Jason Schein, the genus name Dreadnoughtus "alludes to the gigantic body size of the taxon (which presumably rendered healthy adult individuals nearly impervious to attack)" and to the two Argentine dreadnoughts that served in the first half of the twentieth century, Rivadavia and Moreno. Thus, the genus name also honors the country in which Dreadnoughtus schrani was discovered. The name of the type species, schrani, was given in recognition of the American entrepreneur Adam Schran for his financial support of the project.

=== Controversy over the mass/weight ===
The researchers who described Dreadnoughtus schrani estimated its weight using Equation 1 of Campione and Evans (2012), which allows the body mass of a quadrupedal animal to be estimated based only on the circumference of the humerus and femur. Using this scaling equation, they concluded that the Dreadnoughtus type specimen weighed about 59.3 tonnes (58.4 long tons; 65.4 short tons). By comparison, this would mean D. schrani weighed more than eight and a half times as much as a male African elephant and even exceeded the Boeing 737-900 airliner by several tons. This very large mass estimate was quickly criticized. On SV-POW web blog, sauropod researcher Matt Wedel used volumetric models, based on the published figures, that yielded estimates between 36–40 tonnes (35–39 long tons; 40–44 short tons), or even as low as approximately 30 tonnes (30 long tons; 33 short tons), based on a 20% shorter torso. Researcher Gregory S Paul posted a response to Lacovara et al., pointing out that the error margins using equations based on limb bones are large; using the same equation the Dreadnoughtus type specimen could have been anywhere between 44–74 tonnes (43–73 long tons; 49–82 short tons). Using volumetric techniques based on a more accurate skeletal restoration, Paul estimated as low as 26 tonnes (26 long tons; 29 short tons). Benson et al. suggested a maximum body mass of 59 metric tons (65 short tons), but these estimates were questioned due to a very large error range and lack of precision.

A formal re-evaluation of the animal's weight was published in June 2015. In it, a research team led by Karl T. Bates compared the simple scaling equation results with results found using a volume-based digital model with various amounts of soft tissue and "empty space" for the respiratory system. They found that any model using the scale-based weight estimate would have meant the animal had an impossible amount of bulk (fat, skin, muscle, etc.) layered onto its skeleton. They compared their D. schrani volumetric model to those of other sauropods with more complete skeletons and better understood mass estimates to conclude that the D. schrani type specimen must have weighed in the range of 22.1–38.2 tonnes (21.8–37.6 long tons; 24.4–42.1 short tons). Ullmann and Lacovara disputes the methods used by Bates et al., arguing that the new study treats Dreadnoughtus as an exception to well-established mass estimate methods proven on living animals, and that the limb bones would be unnecessarily large if the new mass estimates were correct. In 2019, considering the argument of Ullmann and Lacovara (2016), Gregory S. Paul moderated his mass estimate of Dreadnoughtus type specimen at 31 metric tons (34 short tons), slightly higher than his previous estimation; he even noted that the holotype may have been heavier a tonne or so. In 2017 Campione introduced a modified scaling equation that revised downwards its estimates relative to their original equation, now largely aligning with volumetric estimates. Following this equation the holotype of Dreadnoughtus was now estimated at 48 metric tons (53 short tons) which still proved considerably higher than estimate produced through volumetric models. Campione suggest this discrepancy could be explained by previously unrecognized effects of posture and gait in the scaling relationship between limb bone circumference and body mass when dealing with animals this large or alternatively, ontogeny, since the holotype of Dreadnoughtus was immature and their scaling equations assume maturity. As shown by Brassey et al. (2015) in an immature Stegosaurus, both approaches can be reconciled by applying an ontogenetic correction to the scaling equation.

Lacovara later became the founding executive director of the Edelman Fossil Park & Museum of Rowan University in New Jersey, which opened on March 29, 2025. Dreadnoughtus is one of the museum's featured exhibits, presented as Lacovara's discovery from Patagonia alongside the museum's Late Cretaceous New Jersey fossils.

== Description ==
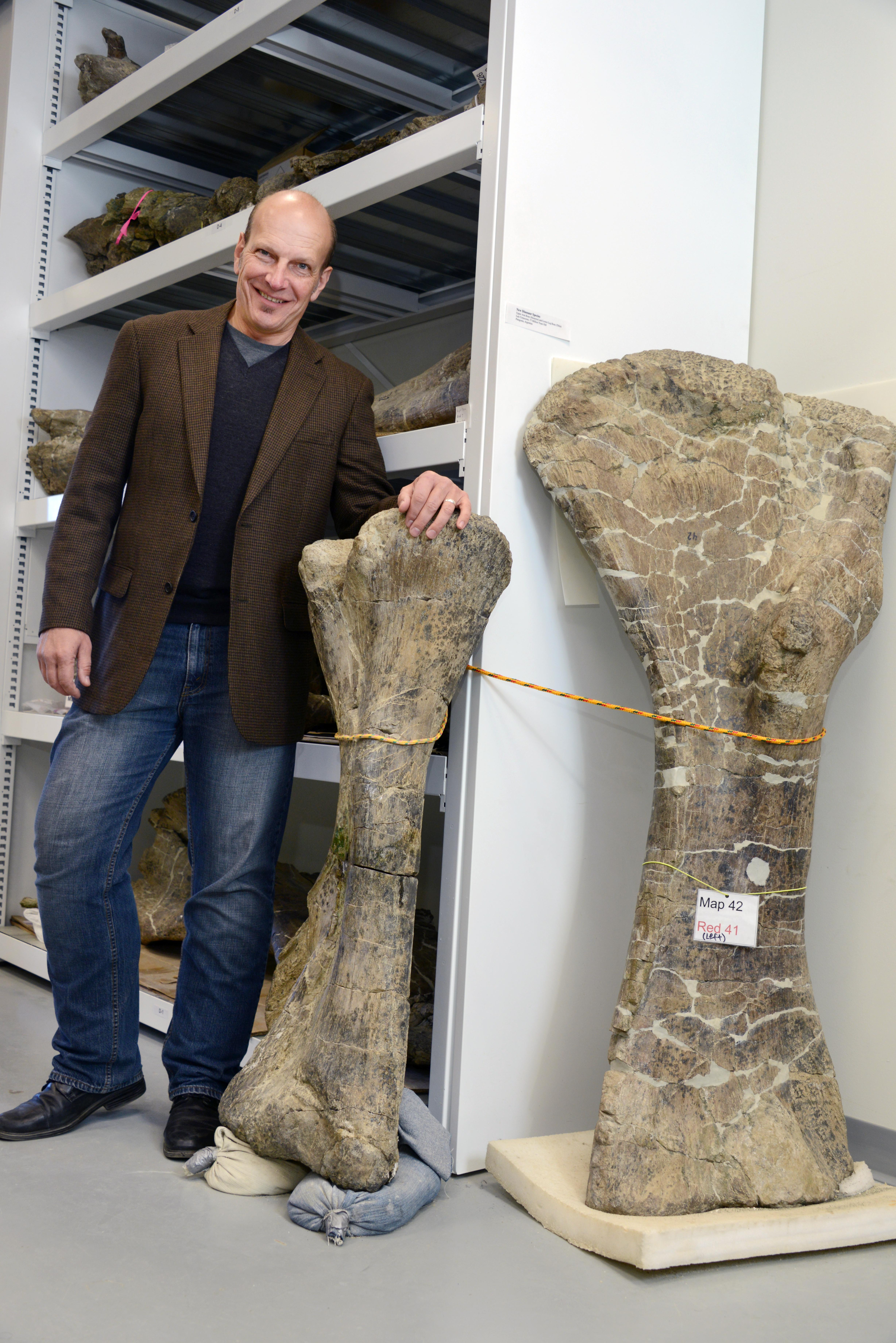
Lacovara (left) with fibula and humerus of Dreadnoughtus

The discovery of Dreadnoughtus schrani provides insight into the size and anatomy of giant titanosaurian sauropods, especially of the limbs and the shoulder and hip girdles. The majority of D. schrani bones are very well preserved. There is minimal deformation, especially in the limb bones. Fine features, such as locations of muscle attachment, are frequently clearly visible. Dreadnoughtus also has an unusually long neck for its body size, making up almost half of the animal's length.

=== Size ===
Approximate dimensions of Dreadnoughtus
Dimension	Metric	Imperial
Maximum mass	49,000kg	108,027lb
Total length	26m	85ft
Head and neck length	12.2m	40ft
Neck-only length	11.3m	37ft
Torso and hip length	5.1m	17ft
Tail length	8.7m	29ft
Shoulder height	6m	20ft

Size of the type specimen compared with a human

Estimates based on measurements of the known parts of the skeleton suggest that the only known individual of Dreadnoughtus schrani was approximately 26 metres (85 ft) long and stood about 2 stories tall. At 1.74 m, its scapula is longer than any other known titanosaur shoulder blade. Its ilium, the top bone of the pelvis, is also larger than any other, measuring 1.31 m in length. The forearm is longer than any previously known from a titanosaur, and it is only shorter than the long forearms of brachiosaurids, which had a more inclined body posture. Only Paralititan preserves a longer humerus (upper arm bone). Although each species likely had slightly different body proportions, these measurements demonstrate the massive nature of Dreadnoughtus schrani. The estimated mass of the type specimen is about 48–49 metric tons (53–54 short tons).

=== Completeness ===
Completeness may be assessed in different ways. Sauropod dinosaur skeletons are often recovered with little to no skull material, so completeness is often looked at in terms of postcranial completeness (i.e., the completeness of the skeleton excluding the skull). Completeness may also be assessed in terms of the numbers of bones versus the types of bones. The most important metric for understanding the anatomy of a fossil animal is the types of bones. The completeness statistics for Dreadnoughtus schrani are as follows:

- 116 bones out of ~256 in the entire skeleton (including the skull) = 45.3% complete
- 115 bones out of ~196 in the skeleton (excluding the skull) = 58.7% complete
- 100 types of bones out of ~142 types in the skeleton (excluding the skull) = 70.4% complete

The completeness of D. schrani compared with other extremely massive (over 40 metric tons) sauropods is as follows:

Sauropod	Skeletal Completeness Total	Mirrored Postcranial Completeness (i.e. types of bones)
Dreadnoughtus schrani	45.5%	70.4%
Turiasaurus riodevensis	44.1%	45.8%
Futalognkosaurus dukei	15.2%	26.8%
Paralititan stromeri	7.8%	12.7%
Argentinosaurus huinculensis	5.1%	9.2%
Antarctosaurus giganteus	2.3%	3.5%
Puertasaurus reuili	1.6%	2.8%

Thus, the skeleton of D. schrani is substantially more complete than those of all other extremely massive (>40 metric tons) dinosaurs.

In 2022, Schroeter and her colleagues discovered soft tissues and collagens from the holotype specimen. They noted the possibility that the individual, to which the holotype specimen belongs, may have been trapped in a rapid burial event; this may explain why the holotype of D. schrani is more completely preserved than other titanosaurs.

=== Posture ===
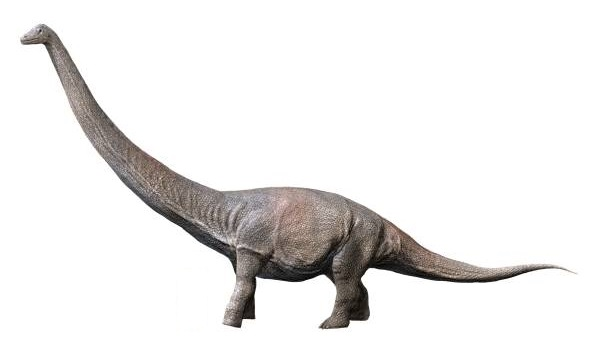
Life restoration

All titanosaurs had what is called wide-gauge posture, a relative term to describe a stance in which the feet fell apart from the body midline. More derived titanosaurs had a greater degree of wide-gauge posture, with their limbs held more widely than their ancestors and contemporaneous counterparts. The stance of Dreadnoughtus schrani was clearly wide-gauge, but not to the degree of saltasaurids because the femoral condyles are perpendicular to its shaft rather than beveled. This and the fact that the head of the femur was not turned in towards the body as in saltasaurids support the phylogenetic conclusion that Dreadnoughtus was not a saltasaurid. The animal's broad sternal bones also demonstrate a wide pectoral girdle, giving it a broad-shouldered, broad-chested appearance. Paleontologist Kenneth Lacovara compared the animal's gait to an Imperial Walker.

Although the forelimbs of D. schrani are longer than in any other previously known titanosaur, they are not significantly longer than the hind limbs. Therefore, Lacovara et al. (2014) reconstructed its neck to have been held more horizontally, rather than anteriorly inclined in the manner of Brachiosaurus.

=== Distinctive features ===
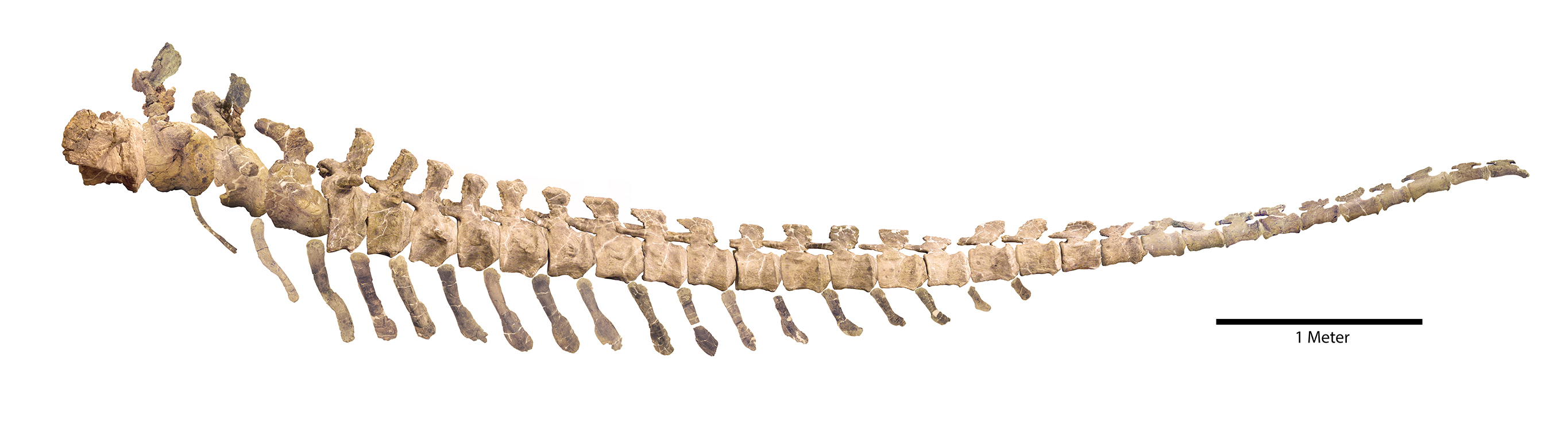
Composite image of the fossil caudal (tail) vertebrae

The tail of Dreadnoughtus schrani has several characteristic features included in the diagnosis of the species. The first vertebra of the tail has a ridge on its ventral surface called a keel. In the first third of the tail, the bases of the neural spines are extensively subdivided into cavities caused by contact with air sacs (part of the dinosaur's respiratory system). In addition, the anterior and posterior boundaries of these neural spines have distinct ridges (pre- and postspinal laminae) connecting them to the pre- and postzygapophyses (the articulation points of the neural arches). In the middle of its tail, the vertebrae have a triangular process that extends over the centrum towards each preceding vertebra.

Just like modern archosaurs with tails (crocodilians, for example), D. schrani had bones below the vertebrae called chevrons or haemel arches. These bones connect with the ventral surface of the vertebrae and are Y-shaped when viewed anteriorly. In Dreadnoughtus schrani the bottom stem of the "Y" is broadly expanded, likely for the attachment of muscles.

The shoulder girdle and forelimb of D. schrani also exhibit unique features. An oblique ridge crosses the interior face of the scapular blade, extending from the top side near the far end of the blade to the bottom side near the base of the scapular blade. Finally, each end of the radius exhibits a unique form: the top, or proximal end, has a distinct concave embayment on its posterior face while the bottom, or distal end, is nearly square in shape instead of broadly expanded.

== Classification ==
Based on a cladistic analysis, Dreadnoughtus schrani appears to be a "derived" basal titanosaur that is not quite a lithostrotian. Lacovara et al. (2014) note that because of the wide array of relatively "advanced" and "primitive" features in the skeleton of Dreadnoughtus schrani and the current instability of titanosaurian interrelationships, future analyses may find widely differing positions for it within Titanosauria.

- Macronaria
  - Camarasauridae
  - - Europasaurus
    - - Euhelopus
      - Titanosauriformes
        - Brachiosauridae
        - Titanosauria
          - Andesaurus
          - - Argentinosaurus
            - - Futalognkosaurus
              - - Dreadnoughtus
                - Lithostrotia
                  - Malawisaurus
                  - - Rapetosaurus
                    - Isisaurus
                    - Saltasauridae
                      - Alamosaurus
                      - Opisthocoelicaudia
                      - Saltasaurinae
                        - Neuquensaurus
                        - Saltasaurus

However, in a subsequent analysis of its limb bones, Ullman & Lacovara found that Dreadnoughtus possessed many of the characteristics of lithostrotians (in particular, it shares a number of traits with Aeolosaurus and Gondwanatitan), which collectively may indicate that it is actually a lithostrotian closely related to Aeolosauridae. While no new phylogenetic analysis was conducted, they suggested that future cladistic analyses should investigate the relationships between Dreadnoughtus, Aeolosaurus, and Gondwanatitan.

== Paleobiology ==
The holotype specimen was likely not fully grown when it died. The histology of the holotype humerus, which shows a lack of an external fundamental system (an outer layer of bone found only in fully-grown vertebrates) and abundant fast-deposited or still-growing woven tissue in the primary fibrolamellar bone of the outer bone cortex, led Lacovara et al. (2014) to determine that the specimen was still growing when it died.

== Taphonomy ==
Based on the sedimentary deposits at the site, the two Dreadnoughtus schrani specimens appear to have been buried quickly during a fluvial avulsion event, or break in a levee resulting in a flood. This event generated a liquefacted crevasse splay deposit which entombed the two dinosaurs. Thus, rapid and relatively deep burial of the Dreadnoughtus type specimen accounts for its extraordinary completeness. Numerous small theropod teeth found amongst the bones are likely evidence of scavenging, most likely by megaraptorans, perhaps Orkoraptor.
