= Alexander Tsiaras =

American photographer and painter

Alexander Tsiaras is an American photographer, entrepreneur, technology innovator, and journalist whose work has appeared on the cover of over 150 magazines. He is the founder, CEO, and editor-in-chief of TheVisualMD and StoryMD.

Tsiaras’ awards include the World Press Photo of the Year, Webby Award, and the Satava Award for his work on improving medicine through advanced technology, and his work has been featured on the covers of Time, the New York Times Magazine, Smithsonian, Life magazine, and the London Sunday Times Magazine.

Tsiaras has lectured and keynoted conferences, including the National Library of Medicine (NLM/NIH) Scientific Visualization Conference, TED, TEDMED, Ink Conference (in association with TED India), Google Health Conference "ThinkHealth 2012", and Medicine Meets Virtual Reality (MMVR). He lectured with Stephen Hawking at the MIT Media Lab.

Some of his most notable publications include From Conception to Birth: A Life Unfolds, Architecture and Design of Man and Woman, and the InVision Guides to Healthy Heart, Sexual Health and Life Blood. His latest releases include Conception to Birth and TheVisualMD Wellness Program, A Scientific Approach to Losing Weight, Preventing Illness and Reversing Chronic Diseases.

== Early life and career ==
The son of Greek immigrants who emigrated via Ellis Island to the US after the conclusion of the Second World War, Tsiaras was raised on the stories of his parents’ homeland. His father would seasonally bring the goats south from Northern Macedonia to a small village near Mount Olympus where he met Tsiaras’ mother.

At the age of 19, Tsiaras travelled to his parents' villages in rural Greece to spend a year herding goats. It was here that he was exposed to the extraordinary centuries-old funeral and exhumation rituals that inspired him to record the local practices and independently kickstart his journalism career. Tsiaras co-authored his first book, Death Rituals of Rural Greece (Princeton University Press), in 1982. "Greeks don't celebrate life, they celebrate death," according to Tsiaras. "We don't celebrate birthdays, we celebrate name days, based on the deaths of saints. In these remote Greek villages, they believe that the soul's transcendence to heaven is directly related to the decomposition of the flesh: the more flesh on the bones exposed at the time of the exhumation, the more sins; the less flesh, the less sins," he added.

== 1980s ==
In the early 1980s, Tsiaras’ work in Greece attracted the attention of the German/US monthly magazine, Geo, who assigned him to travel to his parents' villages to document them through photography. These works, “My Father's Greece”, were published in Geo in 1982. Geo later collaborated with Tsiaras to help them launch as an international presence using his visual prowess.

Tsiaras’ next move was to teach himself mathematics and physics, and he used this knowledge to start developing his own lenses, including one for a microscope that was used to photograph the first images of human eggs in an in vitro fertilization program. Another lens, designed for use with an endoscope, is capable of photographing a fetus from outside the amniotic sac. Images developed using this lens became cover stories for Life Magazine.

In 1989, Tsiaras realized the potential of computer-generated imagery and learned UNIX, then C and C++ to write his own programs that transferred his knowledge of light moving through physical space to light moving through tissue in virtual space.

== 1990s ==
By the 1990s, Tsiaras’ work had gotten him noticed by many media groups, which led to appearances and contributions to various books, magazine covers, and CD-ROMs. One publication of Life magazine dedicated the entire issue to Tsiaras’ visualization of the human body, which was unprecedented for the magazine since they had never before focused on only a single contributor for an issue.

Despite having never formally completed any higher-level education, he was approached by Yale School of Medicine, Department of Surgery, with an offer to become an adjunct professor. Working with Yale, he received funding from NASA to write algorithms for virtual surgery so that astronauts could be surgically treated in robotics pods during deep space flights. As Tsiaras explained, "...if you're on your way to Mars and when passing by the moon you get an appendicitis attack, you're going to have to be cut".

Beginning in 1988 as Anatomical Travelogue, Tsiaras remolded the company into the more user-friendly TheVisualMD in 1997. A media and technology company based in New York, TheVisualMD was dedicated to writing advanced software that scans the body from the molecular to the larger anatomies, from conception to advanced age.
