= EpiBone =

Biomedical engineering company

EpiBone is a biomedical engineering company that is developing technology to create bone tissue from a patient's mesenchymal stem cells in vitro for use in bone grafts.

== History ==
EpiBone was founded in 2013 by Nina Tandon and Sarindr “Ik” Bhumiratana in New York City. The company’s technology derives from research in bone and osteochondral tissue engineering at Columbia University.

== See also ==
- Tissue engineering
- Regenerative medicine
