= Carol Jennings =

British Alzheimer's advocate and campaigner (1954–2024)

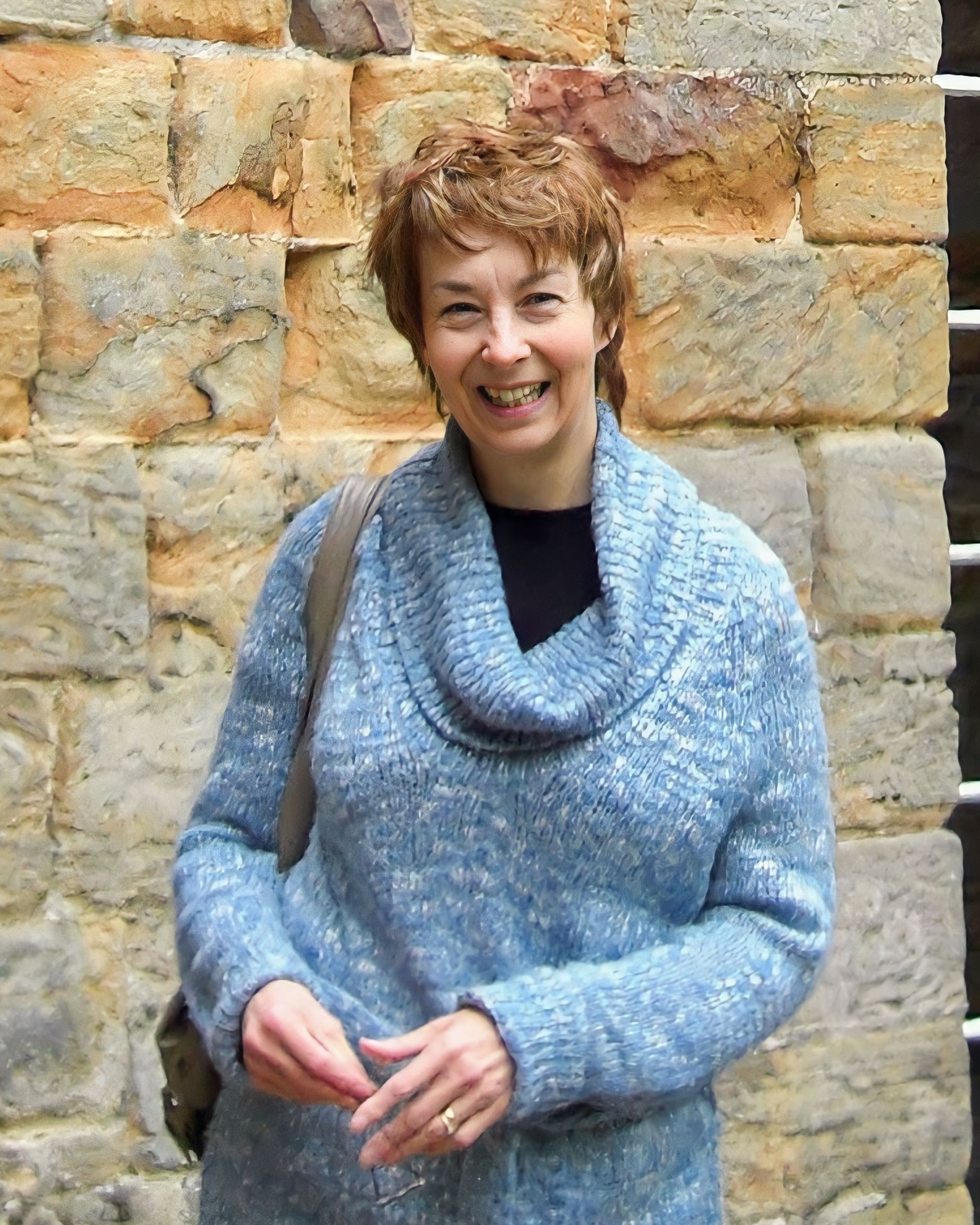
- Born: Carol Joyce Bexon; 25 March 1954; Nottingham, England
- Died: 29 March 2024 (aged 70); Coventry, England
- Years active: 1986–2024
- Known for: Alzheimer's disease activism

Carol Joyce Jennings (née Bexon; 25 March 1954 – 29 March 2024) was a British campaigner and advocate for research into Alzheimer's disease. She served as an honorary Vice-President of the Alzheimer's Society until her death in 2024. Through her activism in the 1980s, Jennings brought her family to the attention of researchers studying the disease, which subsequently led to the discovery of the London Mutation. This mutation, found on the Amyloid Precursor Protein (APP) gene located on chromosome 21, marked a significant breakthrough in understanding the genetic basis of Alzheimer's disease and provided evidence for the development of the 'amyloid hypothesis', which attempts to explain the underlying causes of Alzheimer's disease.

== Early life and biography ==
Jennings was born in Nottingham, England, to Joyce and Walter Bexon. She received her education at Bilborough Grammar School and later attended Chester College, where she completed her teacher training. She went on to marry Stuart Jennings, a Methodist minister and historian, and they had two children. It was during this period that her father, Walter, in his mid-50s at the time, began to exhibit symptoms of Alzheimer's disease.

== Discovery of the London Mutation ==
By the mid-1980s, three of Walter's siblings also displayed signs of Alzheimer's disease, with symptoms emerging much earlier than expected—in their 40s and 50s. Convinced that there must be a genetic link and determined to find answers, Jennings wrote a letter to the research team led by John Hardy in the spring of 1986. At that time, Hardy was an Assistant Professor of Biochemistry at St. Mary's Hospital, Imperial College London.

Genetic Alzheimer’s is rare, accounting for only about 1% of Alzheimer’s cases, but Hardy believed that Jennings’s family could provide clues to the cause of the condition in the wider population, known as 'sporadic Alzheimer's disease'.

To explore this possibility, Professor Hardy and his team of scientists and clinicians, including Professor Martin Rossor collected blood samples from the Jennings family to compare the genetic differences between those who developed Alzheimer's and those who did not. The search took about five years. From the blood samples, DNA was extracted, and Hardy’s team used the Southern blotting technique to examine the genes on chromosome 21. This chromosome was chosen because individuals with three copies of chromosome 21 (Down syndrome) all develop Alzheimer's disease.

The breakthrough came in 1991. Alison Goate, a junior researcher on the team, uncovered the specific gene mutation responsible for the disease in Jennings’s family. Goate, now a professor at Icahn School of Medicine at Mount Sinai, NY, later recalled the discovery as a "eureka moment." The research findings were published in Nature on 21 February 1991, with a summary reported in the British press on 16 February.

The mutation, known as the 'London mutation,' affects the amyloid precursor protein (APP) gene, leading to the formation of amyloid plaques in the brain. Amyloid disrupts normal brain processes by overactivating brain cells and causing ongoing inflammation. It can also impact blood flow and have an impact on other proteins in the brain. When excessive amyloid accumulates, it can interact with the toxic protein tau, causing neuronal death and the symptoms of Alzheimer's disease. In those with genetic Alzheimer’s, this process occurs early because the patient produces too much APP. However, the same process also happens in those with non-genetic Alzheimer’s, albeit at a slower rate.

In 1992, as a direct result of the discovery of mutations in the APP gene, Professor Hardy and Professor David Allsop published the amyloid cascade hypothesis. They hoped that this hypothesis would help in designing drugs to intervene in the disease's progression, influencing the direction of Alzheimer’s research for the following three decades.

== Later developments ==
After the discovery of the London mutation, Jennings left her teaching career to work in Alzheimer's advocacy full-time. Initially, she served as the Alzheimer's Society's first Coordinator for Younger People with Dementia and later worked as an independent advocate for dementia caregivers. During this period, Jennings also worked alongside Penelope Roques and Jill Walton to support members of the Pick's Disease Support Group, the forerunner of what would later become Rare Dementia Support (RDS), a world-leading service for people affected by rare dementias based at the UCL Dementia Research Centre. She is credited as the first support adviser of that group, years before the organisation formally came into existence.

As the amyloid cascade hypothesis gained momentum, Professor Hardy received recognition for his contributions to the field. In 2015, Hardy became the UK's first recipient of the Breakthrough Prize in Life Sciences for "discovering mutations in the amyloid precursor protein (APP) gene that cause early-onset Alzheimer's disease, linking the accumulation of APP-derived beta-amyloid peptide to Alzheimer's pathogenesis, and inspiring new strategies for disease prevention." In his acceptance speech for this award, he expressed special gratitude to Jennings's family. In 2018, Hardy, alongside Christian Haass, Bart De Strooper and Michel Goedert, was honoured with the Brain Prize for "ground-breaking research on the genetic and molecular basis of Alzheimer's disease."

Over time, researchers have expanded upon and challenged this hypothesis, but developing drugs that target amyloid proteins has proven to be a significant challenge, with many failures, underwhelming results, and dangerous side effects reported.

When Jennings herself began to develop symptoms of Alzheimer's disease in 2008, she took a step back from her speaking and advocacy work. However, with the development of new and successful anti-amyloid treatments, journalists and researchers rekindled their interest in the origins of the amyloid hypothesis and Carol Jennings's involvement.

One such success was shown in a large-scale trial of the monoclonal antibody treatment lecanemab. Professor Hardy described the outcome as both "modest" and "historic," and hailed it as the beginning of the end for Alzheimer's disease. In particular, there is hope that anti-amyloid therapies could eventually be used to prevent the disease ever progressing to the symptomatic stage. This resulted in renewed press interest in the Jennings family, and their contribution was once again covered by the press.

Jennings died on 29 March 2024, four days after her 70th birthday.

== Recognition ==
In 2023, both Carol and Stuart Jennings were appointed honorary Vice-Presidents of the Alzheimer's Society, acknowledging their "extraordinary contribution to the field of dementia research". To further honour their legacy, the Alzheimer's Society and the Jennings family established the Carol Jennings Fellowship to support emerging researchers in Alzheimer's disease.

In May 2026, Jennings was awarded a posthumous honorary doctorate, DSc (Med), by University College London, in recognition of her contribution to research that helped establish the amyloid cascade hypothesis and ultimately paved the way for the first disease-modifying therapies for Alzheimer's disease. The degree was conferred by Professor Sir John Hardy at a UCL graduation ceremony, with Stuart Jennings accepting it on Carol's behalf. Hardy noted that her impact on the research was "immeasurable" and would continue to resonate for decades.

== The Jennings vs Alzheimer's ==
In 2022, the BBC announced the commissioning of a feature documentary recounting the story of the Jennings family and their ongoing involvement in Alzheimer's research. The resulting film “The Jennings vs Alzheimer’s” was broadcast on BBC Two and BBC iPlayer on 13 May 2024 in the UK. Directed by Irish filmmaker Niamh Kennedy, the documentary received positive reviews from major newspapers, including The Guardian, The Times, and The Daily Telegraph. It won the award for the Best Science Documentary category at the 2024 Grierson Awards.

== The Carol Jennings Fellowship ==
The Carol Jennings Fellowship was established by the Alzheimer's Society in 2023 to support early-career researchers in Alzheimer's disease. The fellowship honours Carol Jennings' legacy of advocacy and her family's contribution to advancing understanding of the genetic causes of Alzheimer's disease.

=== Recipients ===
- 2023-2024: Dr. Johanna Jackson (Imperial College London) – Dr. Jackson's research utilises advanced techniques to investigate the role of genetics, proteins, and other factors in making synapses vulnerable to damage in Alzheimer's disease.
- 2024-2025: Dr. Chris Hardy (University College London) – Dr. Hardy's research focuses on the connection between hearing loss and dementia, developing new tests of "brain hearing" to help detect, diagnose, and track dementia.
- 2025-2026: Dr. Ian Harrison (University College London) – Dr. Harrison's research centres on boosting the glymphatic system to remove harmful proteins association with Alzheimer's disease.

== See also ==
- Early-onset Alzheimer's disease
