= Julie C. Price =

American physicist and professor of radiology

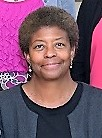
- Price in 2019
- Education: University of Wisconsin-Madison; Johns Hopkins University; National Institutes of Health
- Known for: Pharmacokinetic analyses of PIB PET ligand
- Awards: 2016 Alavi–Mandell Award
- Scientific career
- Fields: Radiology, Physics
- Workplaces: Harvard Medical School

Julie C. Price is an American medical physicist and professor of radiology at Massachusetts General Hospital (MGH), Harvard Medical School (HMS), as well as the director of PET Pharmacokinetic Modeling at the Athinoula A. Martinos Center at MGH. Price is a leader in the study and application of quantitative positron emission tomography (PET) methods. Prior to this, Price worked with Pittsburgh colleagues (Mathis and Klunk) to lead the first fully quantitative pharmacokinetic evaluations of ^{11}C-labeled Pittsburgh compound-B (PIB), one of the most widely used PET ligands for imaging amyloid beta plaques. As a principal investigator at MGH, Price continues work to validate novel PET methods for imaging biological markers of health and disease in studies of aging and neurodegeneration, including studies of glucose metabolism, protein expression, neurotransmitter system function, and tau and amyloid beta plaque burden.

== Early life and education ==
Price attended the University of Wisconsin-Madison for her undergraduate degree. She majored in physics and graduated with a Bachelor of Science in 1982 with key encouragement from Professor Converse Blanchard. Upon completion of her bachelors, Price stayed at the University of Wisconsin-Madison to pursue her master's in medical physics under the mentorship of Professor John Cameron. She worked in the Radiation Calibration Service as a project specialist during her Master's where she explored the efficacy of diode dosimeters used to monitor radiotherapy doses. In 1985, during her Master's training, Price worked as a Summer Physics Research Assistant in the Diagnostic Radiology Department at the Mayo Clinic in Rochester, Minnesota, learning to assess the level of radiation exposure to the fetus from multislice CT scans.

As a Medical Physicist at George Washington University (1986), she had the opportunity to work with Drs. Reba, Gibson, and Zeeburg on kinetic modeling research. She then pursued her graduate studies at Johns Hopkins University within the School of Hygiene and Public Health in Baltimore, Maryland in the Radiation Health Sciences Program, directed by Dr. Henry N. Wagner Jr. Her graduate advisors were Dr. J. James Frost and Dr. Jonathan Links. Her thesis work focused on quantification of opiate receptor and benzodiazepine receptor concentrations and affinity in vivo in the human brain using PET imaging and ^{11}C-Diprenorphine and ^{11}C-flumazenil, respectively. She later took part in a Yale-JHU collaboration to use Single Photon Emission Tomography to measure Benzodiazepine receptor concentration and affinity in the brains of non-human primates using a constant infusion paradigm, led by Drs. Innis and Laruelle.

Price then completed her postdoctoral work at the National Institutes of Health in the Department of PET and Nuclear Medicine. As a National Research Council fellow under the supervision of Drs. Richard Carson and Stephen Bacharach. She helped to implement a novel method to reduce the transmission noise in ^{18}F-FDG cardiac emission images, based on the use of a model that sharpens the peaks of the measured attenuation histograms of the images to minimize noise.

== Career and research ==
Following her postdoctoral training, Price was recruited to the University of Pittsburgh in 1994 as a PET physicist and assistant professor in the PET Facility and Department of Radiology at the University of Pittsburgh Medical Center. In 2002, Price was promoted to associate professor and served as Head of PET Methodology at the University of Pittsburgh PET facility, a position she held until 2016. She was awarded tenure in 2006 and promoted to full professor in the Department of Radiology in 2010 and secondarily in the Department of Biostatistics (2013). She also led the Imaging, Methodology and Statistics Core of the Pittsburgh amyloid imaging program project grant (AG025204, Klunk PI) from 2005 to 2016. Over 35 NIH grantome entries are listed for Price, over a 14-year period, for PET imaging investigations of the pharmacokinetic properties of PET ligands and for clinical research applications in aging, neuropsychiatric disorders, and neurodegeneration.

In 2016, Price became an Investigator in the Department of Radiology at the Massachusetts General Hospital, Director of PET Pharmacokinetic Modeling at the Athinoula A. Martinos Center for Biomedical Imaging, and Visiting Professor of Radiology at Harvard Medical School. As Professor of Radiology (2017), she continued to pursue AD research with members of the Harvard Aging Brain Study (HABS) and Massachusetts Alzheimer's Disease Research Center. She uses her expertise in PET imaging to foster the development of novel methods to improve the early detection of AD through imaging of tau and amyloid beta plaque deposits. She continues to collaborate with her previous institutions including the Waisman Center at the University of Wisconsin-Madison and the University of Pittsburgh through work done on the NIH Down Syndrome Consortium project or ABC-DS. Price is also on the publication committee for the Journal of Cerebral Blood Flow and Metabolism, a leading journal in the field.

As Principal Investigator of the Price Lab at the Martinos Center for Biomedical Imaging, her translational collaborations extend into other areas. These projects include PET imaging to assess epigenetic changes in Huntington's Disease and Parkinson's Disease and developing novel diagnostic methods to measure pathological Tau deposition in the human brain through PET imaging. Her research also addresses race-based differences in disease as she explores the mechanisms of altered peripheral glucose uptake in African American women. She also supports efforts to apply PET imaging to assess the outcomes of meditation on chronic pain and migraines by tracking neuroinflammation using novel PET ligands.

=== Early evaluation of PiB in PET imaging ===
While at the University of Pittsburgh, Price's colleagues William E. Klunk and Chester A. Mathis developed ^{11}C-labeled Pittsburgh compound-B (PiB) one of the first selective PET amyloid beta plaque imaging agents. Price played an integral role in the kinetic evaluation of the Pittsburgh Compound B, and establishing its use for imaging amyloid beta plaques in living human brain. Price also took part in several follow-up studies to evaluate simplified methods and to confirm the optimal time window and experimental designs for use of PIB across the AD disease spectrum and in those at high risk for early onset familial AD. This work represents early critical steps that supported the use of PiB retention as a stable and valid in vivo marker of amyloid beta AD neuropathology and helped to establish this new and rapidly growing field of research.

=== Tau imaging ===
Price's work then extended to PET imaging of tau burden in AD, with neurofibrillary tangles of hyperphosphorylated tau being another neuropathological hallmark of AD. This includes a Pittsburgh neuropathological evaluation of "off-target" Flortaucipir (or ^{18}F-AV-1451) retention in choroid plexus that confounds quantification of tau deposition in hippocampus and a collaboration with University of California Berkeley colleagues to evaluate the regional kinetics of ^{18}F-AV-1451 in aging and dementia. These studies contributed to a better understanding of "on-target" Flortaucipir retention in sub-cortical areas and late scan retention in high-binding individuals that can impact the accuracy and interpretation of longitudinal assessments. Other collaborative work includes efforts by HABS colleagues that include a 2019 study by Dr. Buckley that revealed that women had higher early tau deposition compared to men on an AD trajectory and a 2021 research study that demonstrated initial emergence of the tau PET signal in mesial temporal lobe (MTL) on an individual basis, and MTL tau as a harbinger of future neocortical tau accumulation.

=== Vascular risk factors in brain disease ===
In addition to neurodegeneration, Price helped to investigate vascular abnormalities in psychiatric disease using PET imaging. This includes early research with Dr. Meltzer at Pittsburgh to assess whether cerebral blood flow (CBF) is reduced in aging. That revealed no decrease in CBF after correction of the PET signal for the dilutional effect of age-related atrophy and the impact of this correction on the accuracy of brain measurements. Price's work with Dr. Kaye and colleagues explored changes in CBF in women with bulimia nervosa revealed an inverse relationship between the length of recovery and the level of CBF suggesting that CBF might be a predictor of recovery.

== Awards and honors ==
- 2016 Alavi–Mandell Awards for 2015 Scientific Article, Dr. Chen et al., "Relative ^{11}C-PiB Delivery as a Proxy of Relative CBF: Quantitative Evaluation Using Single-Session ^{15}O-Water and ^{11}C-PiB PET"

== Select publications ==
- Price JC, Lopresti BJ, Mason NS, Holt DP, Meltzer CC, Smith GS, Gunn RN, Huang Y, Mathis CA. Analyses of [18F]altanserin bolus injection PET data II: Consideration of radiolabeled metabolites in humans. Synapse 2001; 41:11-21.
- Klunk WE, Engler H, Nordberg A, Wang Y, Blomqvist G, Holt DP, Bergström M, Savitcheva I, Huang G, Estrada S, Ausén B, Debnath ML, Barletta J, Price JC, Sandell J, Lopresti BJ, Wall A, Koivisto P, Antoni G, Mathis CA, Långström B. Imaging brain amyloid in Alzheimer's disease using the novel PET tracer, PIB. Ann Neurol 2004; 55:306-319.
- Price JC, Klunk WE, Lopresti BJ, Lu X, Hoge JA, Ziolko SK, Holt DP, Meltzer CC, DeKosky ST, Mathis CA. Kinetic Modeling of Amyloid Binding in Humans using PET Imaging and Pittsburgh Compound-B. J Cereb Blood Flow Metab 2005; 25:1528-1547.
- Ziolko SK, Weissfeld LA, Klunk WE, Mathis CA, Hoge JA, Lopresti BJ, DeKosky ST, Price JC. MH070729 Evaluation of Voxel-based Methods for the Statistical Analysis of PIB PET Amyloid Imaging Studies in Alzheimer's Disease. Neuroimage 2006; 33: 94–102.
- Innis RB, Cunningham VJ, Delforge J, Fujita M, Gunn RN, Holden J, Houle S, Huang S-C, Ichise M, Iida H, Ito H, Kimura Y, Koeppe RA, Knudsen GM, Knuuti J, Lammertsma AA, Laruelle M, Logan J, Maguire RP, Mintun M, Morris ED, Parsey R, Price J, Slifstein M, Sossi V, Suhara T, Votaw J, Wong DF, Carson RE. Consensus nomenclature for in vivo imaging of reversibly binding radioligands. J Cereb Blood Flow Metab 2007 27:1533-1539. PMID 17519979.
- Lois C, Gonzalez I, Johnson KA, Price JC. PET imaging of tau protein targets: a methodology perspective. Brain Imaging Behav. doi: 10.1007/s11682-018-9847-7[Epub]. PMID: 29497982
- Jagust WJ, Landau SM, Koeppe RA, Reiman EM, Chen K, Mathis CA, Price JC, Foster NL, Wang AY. The Alzheimer's Disease Neuroimaging Initiative 2 PET Core: 2015. Alzheimers Dement. July 2015;11(7):757-71. doi: 10.1016/j.jalz.2015.05.001. PMID 26194311; PMC4510459
- Jagust WJ, Landau SM, Koeppe RA, Reiman EM, Chen K, Mathis CA, Price JC, Foster NL, Wang AY. The Alzheimer's Disease Neuroimaging Initiative 2 PET Core: 2015. Alzheimers Dement. July 2015;11(7):757-71. doi: 10.1016/j.jalz.2015.05.001. PMID 26194311; PMC4510459
- Buckley RF, Mormino EC, Rabin JS, Hohman TJ, Landau S, Hanseeuw BJ, Jacobs HIL, Papp KV, Amariglio RE, Properzi MJ, Schultz AP, Kirn D, Scott MR, Hedden T, Farrell M, Price J, Chhatwal J, Rentz DM, Villemagne VL, Johnson KA, Sperling RA. Sex Differences in the Association of Global Amyloid and Regional Tau Deposition Measured By Positron Emission Tomography in Clinically Normal Older Adults. JAMA neurology. 2019; PMID 30715078
- Chen KT, Salcedo S, Chonde DB, Izquierdo-Garcia D, Levine MA, Price JC, Dickerson BC, Catana C. MR-assisted PET motion correction in simultaneous PET/MRI studies of dementia subjects. J Magn Reson Imaging. 8 March 2018. doi: 10.1002/jmri.26000 [Epub]. PMID: 29517819.
