= List of fellows of the Royal Society elected in 2009 =

This is a list of fellows of the Royal Society elected in 2009.

== Fellows ==
1. Robert Anthony Ainsworth
2. Ross J. Anderson
3. Michael Norman Royston Ashfold
4. Michael Batty
5. Martin Buck
6. Oscar Peter Buneman
7. Michel Chrétien
8. Jennifer Alice Clack
9. Michael James Duff
10. R. Keith Ellis
11. Jeffrey Graham Ellis
12. James Kazimierz Gimzewski
13. David Moore Glover
14. Christopher Carl Goodnow
15. Wendy Hall
16. Nicholas Paul Harberd
17. John Hardy
18. Brian Arthur Hemmings
19. Christine Holt
20. Christopher Neil Hunter
21. Graham Hutchings
22. Peter Gershon Isaacson
23. Jonathan Peter Keating
24. Dimitris Kioussis
25. Stephen Richard Larter
26. David Alan Leigh
27. David J. C. MacKay
28. Arthur B. McDonald
29. Angela Ruth McLean
30. David Roger Jones Owen
31. Richard Edward Passingham
32. Guy Peel Richardson
33. Wolfram Schultz
34. Keith Shine
35. Henning Sirringhaus
36. Maurice S Skolnick
37. Karen Steel
38. Malcolm Francis Graham Stevens
39. Jesper Qualmann Svejstrup
40. Jonathan Tennyson
41. John Andrew Todd
42. Burt James Totaro
43. John Christopher Vederas
44. John Nicholas Wood

== Foreign members ==
1. John Paul Holdren
2. Howard Robert Horvitz
3. Thomas Kailath
4. Roger D Kornberg
5. Yakov G Sinai
6. Joseph Stiglitz
7. Rashid A Sunyaev
8. Steven D. Tanksley

== Royal fellows ==
1. The Prince of Wales, then Prince William of Wales
