= Randy Buckner =

American neuroscientist and psychologist

- Born: June 15, 1970 (age 56); New Haven, Connecticut, United States
- Education: Washington University in St. Louis
- Known for: default network, functional neuroimaging, cerebellum, memory
- Awards: Metlife Foundation Award (2010)
- Scientific career
- Fields: Psychology; Neuroscience
- Workplaces: Harvard University; Massachusetts General Hospital
- Doctoral advisor: Marcus Raichle; Steven Petersen

Randy L. Buckner (born June 15, 1970) is an American neuroscientist and psychologist. His research focuses on understanding how large-scale brain circuits support mental function and how dysfunction arises in illness.

Buckner is a Professor of Psychology and Neuroscience at Harvard University. He is affiliated with the Center for Brain Science and is Director of the Psychiatric Neuroimaging Research Division at the Massachusetts General Hospital. He is also faculty of the Athinoula A. Martinos Center for Biomedical Imaging.

In 2016, Science Magazine ranked Buckner among the top 10 most influential brain scientists of the modern era based on the Allen Institute's analysis of neuroscience publications.

== Early life ==
Buckner received his B.A. from Washington University in St. Louis in 1991 and his M.A. and Ph.D. from Washington University School of Medicine in 1993 and 1995. His Ph.D thesis from the Program in Neuroscience focused on episodic memory retrieval under the guidance of Steven Petersen and Marcus Raichle. During his graduate training, he was also heavily influenced by Endel Tulving. He trained as a post-doctoral fellow under Bruce Rosen at Massachusetts General Hospital where he worked with Anders Dale to develop event-related functional neuroimaging approaches to study cognition. He then returned to Washington University in St. Louis as Assistant Professor of Psychology and Neurobiology in 1997.

== Research Activities ==
Buckner has made a number of contributions including (1) description of the brain's default network and its importance to Alzheimer's disease, (2) characterization of human memory systems, (3) characterization of the organization of the human cerebellum, and (4) development of event-related functional MRI.

His recent research is centered around exploring human brain network organization and studying the genetic basis of individual differences in brain organization, and neurodegenerative and neuropsychiatric disorders.

His research group helped propose the "tethering hypothesis" - the hypothesis that as the human brain increased in size, the newer areas of the cortex started to wire up with each other to form the "association cortices".

== Open Data Sharing ==
Buckner has long been a proponent of open data sharing and development of neuroinformatics tools. With Daniel Marcus, his laboratory openly released the neuroinformatics data sharing platform XNAT in 2005. Open data sharing projects include OASIS, FC1000, Human Connectome Project, and GSP.

== Selected publications ==
Buckner RL, Snyder AZ, Shannon BJ, LaRossa G, Sachs R, Fotenos AF, Sheline YI, Klunk WE, Mathis CA, Morris JC, Mintun MA (2005) Molecular, structural, and functional characterization of Alzheimer’s disease: Evidence for a relationship between default activity, amyloid, and memory. J Neurosci: 7709-17.

Buckner RL, Carroll DC (2007) Self-projection and the brain. Trends Cognit Sci, 11: 49-57.

Buckner RL, Andrews-Hanna JR, Schacter DL (2008) The brain’s default network: Anatomy, function, and relevance to disease. Ann New York Acad Sci, 1124: 1-38.

Yeo BT, Krienen FM, Sepulcre J, Sabuncu MR, Lashkari D, Hollinshead M, Roffman JL, Smoller JW, Zollei L, Polimeni JR, Fischl B, Liu H, Buckner RL (2011) The organization of the human cerebral cortex estimated by intrinsic functional connectivity. J Neurophys, 106: 1125-65.

Buckner RL, Krienen FM, Castellanos A, Diaz JC, Yeo BT (2011) The organization of the human cerebellum estimated by intrinsic functional connectivity. J Neurophys, 106: 2322-45.

Buckner RL (2012) The serendipitous discovery of the brain’s default network. NeuroImage, 62: 1137-45.

Buckner RL (2013) The cerebellum and cognitive function: 25 years of insight from anatomy and neuroimaging. Neuron, 80: 807-15.
