= ACS Chemical Neuroscience =

- Discipline: Chemistry, neuroscience
- Language: English
- Edited by: Jacob M. Hooker

Publication details
- History: 2010–present
- Publisher: ACS Publications (United States)
- Frequency: Monthly
- Impact factor: 4.2 (2023)

Standard abbreviations
- ISO 4: ACS Chem. Neurosci.

Indexing
- CODEN: ACNCDM
- ISSN: 1948-7193
- LCCN: 2009203104
- OCLC no.: 961371272

Links
- Journal homepage; Online access; Online archive

ACS Chemical Neuroscience is a monthly peer-reviewed scientific journal published by the American Chemical Society. It covers research on the molecular underpinnings of nerve function. The journal was established in 2010. The founding editor-in-chief was Craig W. Lindsley (Vanderbilt University), the current editor-in-chief is Jacob Hooker (Harvard Medical School).

According to the journal's website, it has a 2023 impact factor of 4.2.

== Types of content ==
The journal publishes research letters, articles, and review articles. In addition, specially commissioned articles that describe journal content and advances in neuroscience are solicited.
