= Robert Ainsworth =

Robert Ainsworth may refer to:

- Bob Ainsworth (born 1952), British politician
- Robert Ainsworth (lexicographer) (1660–1743), English Latin lexicographer
- Robert A. Ainsworth Jr. (1910–1981), United States federal judge
- Robert Anthony Ainsworth, British material scientist
