= Collin M. Stultz =

- Born: May 1967 (age 59); Jamaica
- Citizenship: United States

Academic background
- Education: AB, M.D., Ph.D.
- Alma mater: Harvard University; Harvard Medical School; Harvard College

Collin M. Stultz is an American biomolecular engineer, physician-scientist and academic at the Massachusetts Institute of Technology and the Massachusetts General Hospital. He is the Nina T. and Robert H. Rubin Professor in Medical Engineering and Science at MIT, a professor of electrical engineering and computer science also at MIT, a faculty member in the Harvard-MIT Division of Health Sciences and Technology, and a cardiologist at the Massachusetts General Hospital. He is also co-director of the Harvard–MIT Program in Health Sciences and Technology

Stultz's research is focused on understanding the behavior of biomolecules that are involved in common human diseases; on development of machine learning models to identify high risk patients; and on the development of optimal treatment strategies for high risk patients. His work involves the use of computational modeling and machine learning. He is a past recipient of a Burroughs Wellcome Award in the Biomedical Sciences, and a NSF Career Award. He is also a member of the American Institute for Medical and Biological Engineering College of Fellows.

== Education ==
Stultz received his A.B. magna cum laude in Mathematics and Philosophy from Harvard College in 1988. He then went on to receive a M.D. magna cum laude from Harvard Medical School and a Ph.D. in Biophysics from Harvard University, both in 1997. His Ph.D. thesis work was done in the laboratory of Nobelist Martin Karplus.

== Career ==
Stultz joined Harvard Medical School as a clinical fellow in 1997, becoming a research fellow in 2000. At the same time, he also worked as an intern, resident and cardiology fellow at the Brigham & Women's Hospital. He then joined MIT in 2003 as a postdoctoral fellow and became an assistant professor in 2004. He was subsequently appointed the Keck Associate Professor of Biomedical Engineering in 2007. In 2014, Stultz became full professor. Stultz was also appointed to the Committee on Higher Degrees in Biopyshics at Harvard University in 2004 and joined the cardiology staff at the Massachusetts General Hospital in 2017.

In addition to his academic appointments, Stultz is a Principal Investigator of the Research Laboratory of Electronics (RLE), and an associate member of the Computer Science and Artificial Intelligence Laboratory (CSAIL) at MIT. He currently leads the Computational Cardiovascular Research Group at MIT.

Stultz was featured in the 2012 book The Human Face of Big Data, highlighting the software he and co-workers developed, which uses electrocardiographic data to identify patients at high risk for a heart attack.

Shores Salter and Stultz’s efforts to help a Boston Marathon bombing survivor in the immediate aftermath of the attack are described in the 2017 book Perfect Strangers.

== Research and work ==
Stultz's research is focused on understanding the behavior of biomolecules that are involved in common human diseases; on development of machine learning models to identify high risk patients; and on the development of optimal treatment strategies for high risk patients. His work involves the use of computational modeling and machine learning.

Stultz began his career in computational biophysics, modeling the structure and function of flexible proteins that play a role in a number of common human diseases. His early research focused on building and applying computational tools to improve understanding of disease processes at the molecular level. His work in this area has involved using a combination of both computational/theoretical models coupled with biochemical experiments, which are designed to test and refine these models. Most notably, Stultz’ research group has developed methods for analyzing and modeling intrinsically disordered proteins (IDPs) that are involved in neurodegenerative disorders. In the mid 2010s, he and his coworkers developed a novel method for modeling IDPs that uses Bayesian statistics to quantify the uncertainty in the underlying structural ensemble. Stultz and his lab have also developed a variational Bayes’ method that enables them to apply these methods to larger systems in a fraction of the CPU time that would be required using a standard Bayes’ formalism.

In recent years, work in Stultz’s group has shifted to the application of signal processing and machine learning tools to help identify patients at elevated risk of cardiovascular death after an acute coronary syndrome. Stultz and collaborators have developed several ECG-based metrics that help in identifying patients at elevated risk of cardiovascular death after an acute coronary syndrome.

== Societies and awards ==
Stultz has received several honors in recognition of his work. These include a James Tolbert Shipley Prize from Harvard Medical School, a Burroughs Wellcome Fund Career Award (2003), the Irving London Teaching Award (2006), the W. M. Keck Career Development Professorship in Biomedical Engineering from MIT (2007), a Career Award from the National Science Foundation (2008), a Renée Finn Faculty Research Innovation Fellowship (2014). He was inducted into the American Institute for Medical and Biological Engineering College of Fellows. for "ground-breaking contributions to the understanding of protein function in health and disease".

== Selected publications ==
- Fisher, C. K., Huang, A., & Stultz, C. M. (2010). Modeling Intrinsically Disordered Proteins with Bayesian Statistics. Journal of the American Chemical Society, 132(42), 14919–14927.
- Fisher, C. K., & Stultz, C. M. (2011). Constructing ensembles for intrinsically disordered proteins. Current Opinion in Structural Biology, 21(3), 426–431.
- Gurry, T., Ullman, O., Fisher, C. K., Perovic, I., Pochapsky, T., & Stultz, C. M. (2013). The Dynamic Structure of α-Synuclein Multimers. Journal of the American Chemical Society, 135(10), 3865–3872.
- Stultz, C. M., Nambudripad, R., Lathrop, R. H., & White, J. V. (1997). Predicting Protein Structure With Probabilistic Models. Advances in Molecular and Cell Biology, 447–506.
- Stultz, C. M. (2002). Localized Unfolding of Collagen Explains Collagenase Cleavage Near Imino-poor Sites. Journal of Molecular Biology, 319(5), 997–1003.
- Stultz, C. M., White, J. V., & Smith, T. F. (2008). Structural analysis based on state-space modeling. Protein Science, 2(3), 305–314.
- Syed Z., Stultz CM., Scirica BM., Guttag JV. Computationally Generated Cardiac Biomarkers for Risk Stratification Following Acute Coronary Syndrome. Science: Translational Medicine 28 September Vol 3 Issue 102 102ra95, 2011.
- Myers PD., Huang W., Anderson F., Stultz SM. (2017) Choosing Clinical Variables for Risk Stratification Post-Acute Coronary Syndrome, Scientific Reports 7, 1–12
- Stultz CM. The Advent of Clinically Useful Deep Learning. Journal of the American College of Cardiology, Electrophysiology (2019), vol. 5 no. 5 587-589
