= Henrik Zetterberg (neurochemist) =

Swedish professor of neurochemistry

- Born: 1973 (age 52–53)
- Education: University of Gothenburg
- Known for: Alzheimer research
- Scientific career
- Fields: Neurochemistry
- Workplaces: University of Gothenburg and University College London
- Doctoral advisor: Lars Rymo
- Other academic advisors: Dennis J. Selkoe

Henrik Zetterberg (born 1973) is a Swedish professor of neurochemistry at the University of Gothenburg, where he is the Head of the Department of Neurochemical Pathophysiology and Diagnostics. He is also the leader of the Fluid biomarkers for neurodegenerative diseases group at University College London. The groups work on developing early tests for dementia.

== Early life and career ==
Zetterberg was born and brought up in the Gothenburg archipelago, Sweden. He completed his doctoral thesis in 2003 on the subject of the Epstein–Barr virus. He performed postdoctoral research at Harvard using zebrafish as a model for alzheimer's disease. Zetterberg has worked together with Kaj Blennow, whom he met during his PhD, on many projects including coleading the Clinical Neurochemistry Laboratory together with him.

== Research ==
His research includes the development of methods for early diagnostics for frontotemporal dementia through the use of Biomarkers, In 2020, a team of scientists led by Zetterberg published results regarding a new diagnostic for Alzheimer's disease based on protein concentrations in cerebrospinal fluid, which is a colorless fluid surrounding the brain and spinal cord. The test was reported to have an accuracy of around 90% and could detect the disease about two decades before significant symptoms were present.
