= Carl Cotman =

American neuroscientist

- Born: 5 April 1940
- Died: 5 August 2024 (aged 84)
- Citizenship: American
- Education: College of Wooster; Wesleyan University; University of Indiana
- Known for: Research on the neurochemistry of dementia
- Awards: International Conference on Alzheimer’s Disease lifetime achievement award (2008); Metlife Foundation Award for Medical Research in Alzheimer's Disease (1988)
- Scientific career
- Fields: Neurology; Neuroscience
- Workplaces: University of California, Irvine
- Thesis: Structure and function of the synaptic complex from rat brain (1968)
- Doctoral advisor: Henry R. Mahler

Carl Wayne Cotman (5 April 1940 – 5 August 2024) was an American neuroscientist. He was a professor of neurology at the University of California, Irvine School of Medicine, where he was also the founding director of the Institute for Brain Aging and Dementia and the Institute for Memory Impairments and Neurological Disorders (UCI MIND). He is known for researching the neurochemistry of Alzheimer's disease and other forms of dementia. His research has shown, for example, that physical exercise increases production of brain-derived neurotropic factor, which protects neurons from aging-related damage and promotes the growth of new ones. Cotman died in August 2024.

== Early life and education ==
Cotman received a bachelor's degree in chemistry from the College of Wooster in 1962 and a master's degree in analytical chemistry from Wesleyan University in 1964.
