= Athinoula A. Martinos Center for Biomedical Imaging =

- Massachusetts General Hospital

Geography
- Location: 149 13th Street; Charlestown, MA 02129, United States

Organization
- Affiliated university: Harvard Medical School, MIT
- Network: Massachusetts General Hospital

History
- Founded: 1989 (as the MGH NMR Center)

Links
- Website: www.martinos.org
- Lists: Hospitals in the United States

The Athinoula A. Martinos Center for Biomedical Imaging, usually referred to as just the "Martinos Center," is a major hub of biomedical imaging technology development and translational research. The Center is part of the Department of Radiology at Massachusetts General Hospital and is affiliated with both Harvard University and MIT. Bruce Rosen is the Director of the Center and Monica Langone is the Administrative Director.

The core technologies being developed and used at the Center are magnetic resonance imaging (MRI) and in vivo magnetic resonance spectroscopy (MRS), magnetoencephalography (MEG) and electroencephalography (EEG), optical imaging techniques (microscopy and near-infrared spectroscopy), positron emission tomography (PET), molecular imaging, medical image computing (MIC), health informatics, artificial intelligence in healthcare, and transcranial magnetic stimulation. A particular area of innovation at the Center is Multimodal Functional Neuroimaging, which involves the integration of imaging technologies for neuroscience applications. Major areas of research at the Center include: psychiatric, neurologic and neurovascular disorders; basic and cognitive neuroscience; cardiovascular disease; cancer; and more. Scientific investigation and technology development is funded through government, industry and other research grants.

The center is located in the Massachusetts General Hospital (MGH) East Campus in the Charlestown Navy Yard, 149 13th St. Charlestown, MA 02129. Separately, Massachusetts Institute of Technology (MIT) is home to its own Martinos Imaging Center.

The Martinos Center is home to approximately 120 faculty members and more than 100 postdoctoral research fellows and graduate students, and is a resource to hundreds of researchers and students throughout Boston, the United States and the world. The research faculty are basic scientists and clinicians interested in a broad range of biologically and medically important questions. They work in conjunction with physical scientists, computer scientists, and engineers to develop new imaging technologies and research applications, and to bring these developments to the sphere of medical care. Some of the prominent faculty at the Center include Bruce Rosen, Lawrence Wald, David Boas, Jacob Hooker, Julie C. Price, Peter Caravan, Anna Moore, Umar Mahmood, Randy Buckner, Matthew S. Rosen, Maria Angela Franceschini, Bruce Fischl and Marco Loggia.

The Center includes investigators and their laboratories based at the MGH research campus in Charlestown, as well as numerous other researchers from various departments within MGH, and other local, national and international institutions. Most Martinos Center-based faculty members have primary appointments in Radiology at MGH and Harvard, some with secondary appointments at MIT. Several of the investigators from other MGH departments and other institutions work at the Center, while even more conduct long- and short-term imaging studies at the Center and maintain their base elsewhere.

The center is a member or collaborator with NCRR (and BIRN), NIDA, NIBIB, National Cancer Institute, NINDS, NCCAM, ONDCP, and The MIND Institute. The center also has a strategic corporate partnerships with Siemens Medical Solutions, Pfizer Inc., and Canon Inc. It is also a Harvard Catalyst site, and incorporates research projects from Boston University, McLean Hospital, and other Boston institutions.

At the MGH Navy Yard site, there are eight large bore and five small bore MRI scanning bays used primarily for research, including the high-gradient field Human Connectome Project scanner, a 7 tesla magnet for human radiography, and a combined PET-MRI. The Martinos Center also served as the site for the development of magnetoencephalography (MEG), and software development for analysis of MEG data is ongoing at the facility. New MRI and MRS sequences are developed in conjunction with Martinos, Harvard, and MIT faculty. In addition, the Center serves as a development site for new Siemens equipment, such as 32, 64, and 128 channel MRI coils which were designed and prototyped there.
