= Wolfram Goessling =

Physician and scientist

- Born: 19 October 1967 (age 58)
- Education: Witten/Herdecke University (MD, PhD)
- Scientific career
- Fields: Oncology, gastroenterology
- Workplaces: Brigham and Women's Hospital Dana–Farber Cancer Institute Harvard Medical School
- Website: www.hms.harvard.edu/dms/bbs/fac/Goessling.php; www.dfhcc.harvard.edu/insider/member-detail/member/wolfram-goessling-md-phd/; www.fishing4stemcells.org; www.fishing4stemcells.org/wolfram

Wolfram Goessling (born 19 October 1967) is a physician-scientist who specializes in oncology and gastroenterology. He is the chair at the Department of Internal Medicine at Yale. He was the Robert H. Ebert Professor of Medicine at Harvard Medical School and Chief of the Division of Gastroenterology at Massachusetts General Hospital. Goessling was also involved in the Harvard–MIT Program of Health Sciences and Technology (HST), where he had serves as co-director alongside Emery N. Brown.

== Career and personal life ==
Goessling is a member of the Cancer Genetics Program and the Gastrointestinal Malignancies Program, both at the Dana-Farber/Harvard Cancer Center. He is also Advisory Dean of the Irving M. London Society for HST students. He has been hailed for his accessibility, compassion, and knowledge, even while fighting his own aggressive malignancy.

In 2013 Goessling was awarded the Irving M. London Teaching Award, together with Daniel Soloman.

He holds the Jules L. Dienstag, M.D. and Betty and Newell Hale Endowed Chair in Gastroenterology at Massachusetts General Hospital.

Goessling has been a longtime trumpeter for the Longwood Symphony Orchestra.

== Selected publications ==
- Goessling, Wolfram (2023). Am Leben bleiben. Ein Onkologe bekämpft seinen Krebs [Staying alive. An oncologist fights his cancer] (in German). Hamburg: Rowohlt. ISBN 978-3-499-00605-0.
