= Bart De Strooper =

Belgian molecular biologist

Bart De Strooper is a Belgian molecular biologist and professor at Vlaams Instituut voor Biotechnologie and KU Leuven (Leuven, Belgium) and the UK Dementia Research Institute and University College London, UK. De Strooper's research seeks to understand the disease mechanisms underlying neurodegenerative diseases like Alzheimer's disease. His major findings include the role of ADAM10 and presenilin/gamma-scretase in the proteolysis of the amyloid precursor protein (APP) and Notch, and the generation of amyloid pathology. More recently, he has demonstrated the central role of glia in Alzheimer's disease.

== Career ==
De Strooper obtained an MD at the KU Leuven in 1985 and a PhD in 1992. He would go on to complete his postdoc at the European Molecular Biology Laboratory (EMBL) in Heidelberg Germany under Dr. Carlos Dotti. De Strooper returned to his alma mater in 1999, joining the VIB Center for the Biology of Disease, now known as the VIB-KU Leuven Center for Neuroscience. Along with continued advancement in neurodegenerative diseases, De Strooper became the center's Departmental Director in 2007, leading over 250 neuroscience researchers. He would also serve as a Professor of Neurodegenerative Diseases at University College London.

In December 2016 he became the director of the UK Dementia Research Institute (DRI) at University College London. Under De Strooper's leadership, the DRI "established seven major research centres, recruited over 60 Principal Investigators, and built a community of 800-plus researches". De Strooper voluntarily stepped down from the role in November 2022, citing a desire to focus on dementia and translational neuroscience at the UCL Queen Square Institute of Neurology. He continues to collaborate with the Academy of Medical Sciences fellowship, to which he was elected to in 2020.

== Awards ==
Together with Christian Haass, De Strooper received the Potamkin Prize in 2002. The following year he was the recipient of the 2003 Alois Alzheimer Award of the Deutscher Gesellschaft für Gerontopsychiatrie und psychotherapie and the 2005 Joseph Maisin Prize for fundamental biomedical sciences.He received the 2008 Metlife Foundation Award for Medical Research in Alzheimer's Disease along with Robert Vassar and Philip C. Wong

He shared the 2018 Brain Prize with John Hardy, Christian Haass and Michel Goedert. The same year Expertscape, a research ranking publisher, recognized Dr. De Strooper as one of the top experts in the world in Alzheimer's disease. In the same year, De Strooper was awarded the prestigious Commander of the Order of Leopold I, a national honorary orders of Knightood.

== Sources ==
- VIB Department of Molecular and Developmental Genetics
- Bart De Strooper
