= Marco Loggia =

Neuroscientist

- Born: Marco Luciano Loggia; January 6, 1979 (age 47); Vizzolo Predabissi (Milan, Italy)
- Citizenship: Italian
- Education: McGill University, Vita-Salute San Raffaele University
- Scientific career
- Fields: Brain Imaging, Pain, Neuroscience

Marco Loggia is a US-based Italian neuroscientist who specializes in brain imaging. He is a professor of Radiology and Anaesthesia at Harvard Medical School, and directs the Pain and Neuroinflammation Imaging Laboratory, located at the Athinoula A. Martinos Center for Biomedical Imaging, Massachusetts General Hospital (MGH). He is also the co-director of the Center of Integrative Pain NeuroImaging (CiPNI) at MGH. He is known for his work on brain mechanisms of pain, especially using functional magnetic resonance imaging (fMRI) and positron emission tomography (PET). He has been a pioneer in the use of Arterial Spin Labeling and second-generation TSPO PET ligands for the study of chronic pain. He is a Section Editor for the journal PAIN, and also serves on the editorial board for the Journal of Pain and Pain Medicine. His work has been highlighted by many media outlets, including Popular Science, New Scientist, Scientific American, ABC News, la Repubblica, Sky TG24, the Harvard Gazette and others.

== Biography ==
Loggia was born in Italy, where he obtained a Laurea (a five-year degree equivalent to a B.Sc. plus a M.Sc.) in Experimental Psychology at the Universita’ Vita-Salute San Raffaele (Milan, Italy). In 2008 he was awarded a Ph.D. in Neurological Sciences by McGill University in Montreal, QC (Canada), under the mentorship of Prof. M. Catherine Bushnell. He then held the position of Research Fellow at Harvard Medical School until 2013, when he became faculty at Harvard Medical School and Massachusetts General Hospital.

He and his wife Nazma have three children: Gabriele, Suraiya and Naima.

== Awards and recognition ==
Loggia is a recipient of the 2013 Early Career Award from the International Association for the Study of Pain (IASP) and the 2016 IASP Ulf Lindblom Young Investigator Award for Clinical Science. He is also the principal investigator of several federal and foundation grants, including from the National Institutes of Health, the Department of Defense, and various foundations. The Harvard Gazette described his work on neuroinflammation in chronic back pain as a "breakthrough on chronic pain." His study of neuroinflammation in fibromyalgia, conducted in collaboration with Karolinska Institutet, was named one of the "Top Ten Cell Science News Stories of 2018" by Technology Networks. In 2021, he was named Distinguished Investigator by the Academy for Radiology & Biomedical Imaging Research.
