= Roozbeh Ghaffari =

American biomedical engineer and neuroscientist

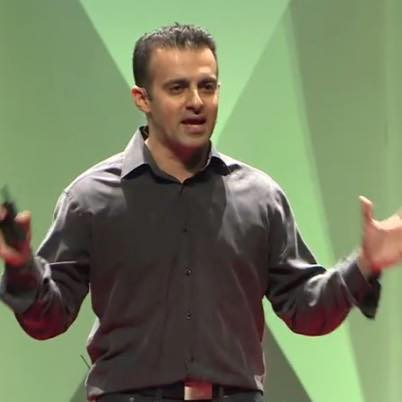
- Education: Massachusetts Institute of Technology (BS, MS, PhD)
- Known for: cochlear mechanics, microfabrication, microfluidics, nanotechnology, flexible electronics.
- Awards: MIT 100K Grand Prize Winner (2008) Harvard Business School Business Social Enterprise Grand Prize Winner (2008) Technology Review 35 under 35 (2013)
- Scientific career
- Fields: Bioelectronics, Soft Materials, Neuroscience, Nanotechnology, Microfluidics
- Workplaces: Epicore Biosystems, Inc.; Northwestern University; MC10 Inc.; Blendoor Inc.; MIT Research Laboratory of Electronics
- Thesis: The functional role of the tectorial membrane in cochlear mechanics (2008)
- Doctoral advisor: Dennis M. Freeman
- Other academic advisors: John A. Rogers (Faculty mentor)

Roozbeh Ghaffari is a biomedical engineer and neuroscientist. He is currently CEO and co-founder of Epicore Biosystems, research associate professor at Northwestern University's Biomedical Engineering Department, and Director of Translational Research in the Querrey Simpson Institute for Bioelectronics.

== Professional career ==
Ghaffari obtained BS and M.Eng degrees in electrical engineering and bioelectrical engineering, respectively, from the Massachusetts Institute of Technology in 2001 and 2003. He then completed his PhD research and training at the Harvard–MIT Program in Health Sciences and Technology (HST) in 2008. Ghaffari was advised by Professor Dennis Freeman at the MIT Research Laboratory of Electronics, where he conducted research in auditory neuroscience and cochlear mechanisms using microfabrication and microfluidic technologies.

Upon completion of his PhD degree, Ghaffari co-founded MC10 Inc in 2008 (acquired by Medidata in 2020), and was MC10's Chief Technology Officer until 2017. Ghaffari then joined Northwestern University faculty where he is research associate professor in the Department of Biomedical Engineering and is co-founder and CEO of Epicore Biosystems.

== Research focus ==
Ghaffari's research focus lies at the interface of bioelectronics and biology. His research and commercial efforts have led to the development of novel classes of bioelectronic devices and microfluidic-based systems for commercial applications in sports performance, consumer health, and personalized care. He has published over 90 academic papers and is inventor on over 50 issued patents.

== Translational focus ==
In 2008, Ghaffari co-authored the business plan for Diagnostics For All, a non-profit health diagnostics organization spun out of Prof. George Whitesides Laboratory at Harvard University. Diagnostics for All won the grand prizes of the MIT 100K and Harvard Business School Social Enterprise business plan contests in 2008. Ghaffari then co-founded MC10 Inc and Epicore Biosystems with his advisor, Prof. John A. Rogers. He is CEO of Epicore Biosystems. He is on the board of advisors of Blendoor, the advisory board of the University of Vermont's Department of Biomedical Engineering, and on the editorial board of Digital Biomarkers Journal and Sensors.

== Awards and honors ==
- Crain's Notable Entrepreneurs Award 2019

M* obile World Congress Gold Prize Winner (2018)

- Museum of Modern Art (NYC) ‘Sweat Microfluidics: Lab on the Skin’ Exhibit (2017)
- TEDX Gateway Invited Speaker (2016)
- IEEE Spectrum Emerging Technology Award (2016)
- MIT Technology Review: 35 Innovators Under 35 Award (2013)
- Diagnostics For All NYSE Opening Bell Ceremony (2008)
- Grand Prize Winner MIT 100K Entrepreneurship Competition ($100K Award) (2008)
- Grand Prize Winner Harvard Business School Social Enterprise Competition (2008)
