= Peter Davies (scientist) =

Welsh scientist and active researcher (1948–2020)

- Born: Peter Davies; 18 July 1948; Tredegar, Wales
- Died: 26 August 2020 (aged 72)
- Education: University of Leeds
- Occupation: Scientist
- Employer: Feinstein Institutes for Medical Research
- Known for: Medical Research
- Website: feinstein.northwell.edu

Peter Davies (1948 - 2020) was a Welsh scientist and researcher who was best known for his work on Alzheimer’s disease. He was the head and director of the Litwin-Zucker Research Center for The Study of Alzheimer's disease and memory disorders, associated with the Feinstein Institute for Medical Research in Manhasset, New York, US.

== Education ==
Davies received his BSc (Hons., 1st class) and PhD, both in biochemistry, from the University of Leeds in 1971 and 1974, respectively. He was a post-doctoral fellow in the Department of Pharmacology at the University of Edinburgh, Scotland, before joining the staff of the Medical Research Council Brain Metabolism Unit in Edinburgh in 1974, where he began his research on Alzheimer's disease.

== Academic appointments ==
In 1977, Davies moved to Albert Einstein College of Medicine in the Bronx, New York City, where he was an assistant professor from 1977 to 1981, an associate professor from 1981 to 1986, and a full professor starting in 1986. He became the scientific director of the Litwin-Zucker Center for Research on Alzheimer's disease at the Feinstein Institutes for Medical Research, North Shore-LIJ Health System, in 2006.

== Principal scientific contributions ==
Davies' research was focused on the biochemistry of Alzheimer's disease with the goal of developing effective therapies. His early work was in the development of the currently approved drugs for Alzheimer's disease: Aricept, Exelon and Razadyne. He was interested in the pathogenesis of Alzheimer's disease, and said that the disease may be a process of uncontrolled cell cycle division. He had evidence that the switch that drives the cell cycle of neurons, which is a one-time event when the neuron is born, is somehow tripped and reactivated late in life. He and his team designed an experiment to turn on the cell cycle in laboratory models. They put a viral oncogene into differentiated neurons and watched as pathological events progressed. In 2004 Davies and his collaborators identified a marker in cerebrospinal fluid (CSF) that can distinguish Alzheimer's disease from normal ageing, and also can discriminate between Alzheimer's and other forms of dementia.

== Awards and honors ==
- International Congress on Alzheimer's Disease (ICAD) Lifetime Achievement Award
- Metlife Foundation Award for Medical Research in Alzheimer's Disease (1986)
- National Institute of Health (NIH) MERIT award NIMH, 1989–1999
- National Institute of Health (NIH) MERIT award NIA, 2003–2013
- The 2015 Potamkin Prize for research in Pick's, Alzheimer's, and related diseases

== Selected publications ==
- Hampel H, Buerger K, Zinkowski R, Goernitz A, Teipel SJ, Andreasen N, Sjogren M, DeBernardis J, Kerkman D, Ishiguro K, Ohno H, Vanmechelen E, Vanderstichele H, McCulloch C, Möller HJ, Davies P, Blennow K. "Measurement of phosphorylated tau epitopes in the differential diagnosis of Alzheimer disease – a comparative CSF study", Archives of General Psychiatry, 61; 95–102, 2004
- Conrad C. Vianna C. Schultz C. Thal DR. Ghebremedhin E. Lenz J. Braak H. Davies P. "Molecular Evolution and Genetics of the Saitohin Gene and tau haplotype in Alzheimer's Disease and Argyrophilic Grain Disease". J Neurochem, 89, 179–188, 2004.
- Bargorn S. Davies P. Mandelkow E. "Tau paired helical filaments from Alzheimer's disease brain and assembled in vitro are based on beta-structure in the core domain", Biochemistry 43, 1694–1703, 2004.
- Andorfer CA. Acker CM. Kress Y. Hof PR. Duff K. Davies P. "Cell Cycle Re-entry and Cell Death in Transgenic Mice Expressing Non-Mutant Human Tau Isoforms", J Neurosci 25; 5446–5454, 2005.
- Marambaud P. Zhao H. Davies P. "Resveratrol promotes clearance of Alzheimer's disease amyloid-beta peptides", J Biol Chem 280, 37377–37382, 2005.
- de Leon MJ. DeSanti S. Zinkowski R. Mehta PD. Pratico D. Segala S. Rusinek H. Lia J. Tsui W. Saint Louis LA. Clark CM. Tarshish C. Lia Y. Lair L. Javier E. Rich K. Lesbre P. Mosconi L. Reisberg B. Sadowski M. DeBernadis JF. Kerkman DJ. Hampel H. Wahlund L-O. Davies P. "Longitudinal CSF and MRI biomarkers improve the diagnosis of mild cognitive impairment", Neurobiology of Aging 27, 394–401, 2006.
- d’Abramo C. Ricciarelli R. Pronzato MA. Davies P. "Troglitazone, a Peroxisome Proliferator-activated Receptor-gamma agonist, decreases tau phosphorylation in CHOtau4R cells", J. Neurochem 98, 1068–1077, 2006.
- Park KHJ. Hallows JL Chakrabarty P Davies P Vincent I. "Conditional neuronal SV40 T Antigen expression induces Alzheimer-like tau and amyloid pathology in mice", J Neurosci 27, 2969–2978, 2007.
- Espinoza M. de Silva R. Dickson DW. Davies P. "Differential Incorporation of Tau Isoforms in Alzheimer's Disease", Journal of Alzheimer’s Disease, 14, 1–16, 2008.

=== Complete list of publications ===
https://scholar.google.com/citations?user=GnqJHnwAAAAJ&hl=en
