= Miia Kivipelto =

Finnish neurologist (born 1973)

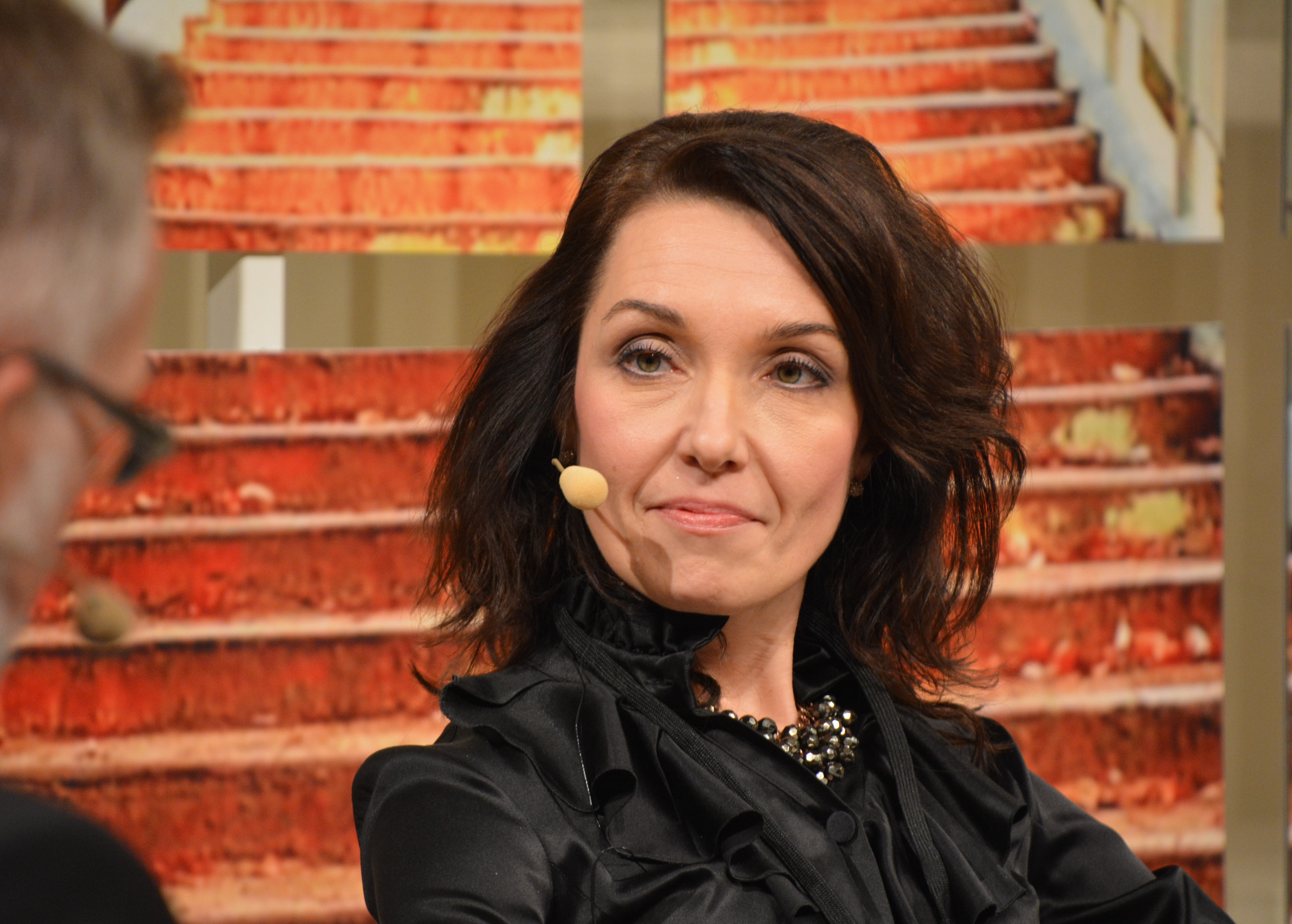
Miia Kivipelto in December 2014.

Miia K. Kivipelto (born 1973) was a Finnish neuroscientist and professor at the University of Eastern Finland and Karolinska Institute in Stockholm. As of March 2025, she is a professor at Yale School of Nursing and Yale School of Medicine in New Haven, Connecticut. Her research focuses on dementia and Alzheimer's disease.

== Early life and education ==
Kivipelto was born in Alajärvi, Finland in 1973. She studied medicine at the University of Kuopio (now University of Eastern Finland) and received her MD in 1999, specializing in geriatrics. She received her PhD in 2002 after defending her dissertation on vascular risk factors in Alzheimer's disease. In a 2017 interview, Kivipelto attributed her interest in dementia, Alzheimer's, and diseases of aging to her close relationship with her grandmother, who developed Alzheimer's when she was young.

Kivipelto held a post-doctoral fellowship at the Karolinska Institute from 2002–2005. In 2006, Kivipelto was appointed associate professor of neuroepidemiology at the University of Kuopio. Kivipelto became a senior lecturer at the Karolinska Institute (KI) in 2010 and was appointed professor of clinical geriatric epidemiology there in 2011. She was a deputy director of the KI Aging Research Center and the KI Memory Clinic clinical trial unit at the Karolinska University Hospital in Huddinge.

== Research ==
Kivipelto studies the epidemiology, prevention, and treatment of dementia, which is a decline in cognitive function strongly associated with ageing and neurodegenerative diseases such as Alzheimer's disease. Her research has identified connections between memory disorders and vascular risk factors such as high blood lipids and high blood pressure, as well as general health risk factors such as poor physical fitness and obesity. Kivipelto published a composite risk score to predict dementia risk based on these factors in 2006 following the Cardiovascular Risk Factors, Aging, and Dementia (CAIDE) population-based study.

From 2009–2011, Kivipelto led the Finnish Geriatric Intervention Study to Prevent Cognitive Impairment and Disability (FINGER) clinical trial, which demonstrated that a multidomain intervention of diet, exercise, cognitive training, and vascular risk monitoring may preserve cognitive functioning in elderly people with high dementia risk. She currently leads the World Wide FINGERS initiative, which aims to replicate multi-domain dementia prevention trials and share data internationally.

== Awards and honors ==
Kivipelto has received several awards for her work:

- Award for Social Impact, Academy of Finland (2009)
- Outstanding Young Person of the World, Junior Chamber International (2011)
- Metlife Foundation Award for Medical Research in Alzheimer's Disease (2016)
- Neuroscientist of the Year, Brain Research Society of Finland (2018)
- The Ryman Prize in 2021.

== See also ==
- Alzheimer's disease research
- Prevention of dementia
- Neuroscience of ageing
