= Chester Mathis =

American chemist

Chester A. Mathis
- Education: Humboldt State University B.Sc. (1972); UC Davis Ph.D. (1979)
- Awards: Metlife Foundation Award for Medical Research in Alzheimer's Disease (2004); Potamkin Prize (2008); Reagan Institute Award (2009)
- Scientific career
- Institutions: University of Pittsburgh Medical Center

Chester Mathis is an American chemist who is currently the Distinguished Professor of Radiology at University of Pittsburgh and holds the UPMC Endowed Chair of PET Research.

He is known for is work with William E. Klunk on a PET radiotracer for imaging amyloid, a protein linked to neurodegenerative diseases including Alzheimer’s. His efforts led to the creation of a novel category of high-efficacy radiopharmaceutical agents, for example Pittsburgh Compound-B (PiB), which can be used to assess beta-amyloid in the living human brain using PET scanning, and which is a fluorescent analog of thioflavin T. For his work on Alzheimer's disease he has received the Metlife Foundation Award (2004) and the Potamkin Prize (2008).
