= Alison Goate =

British neuroscientist

- Education: University of Oxford (DPhil 1983); University of Bristol
- Known for: Alzheimer's disease, addiction
- Awards: Potamkin Prize (1993); Metlife Foundation Award (1994); Alzheimer's Association Lifetime Achievement Award (2015); Rainwater Prize(2022); Piepenbrock-DZNE Prize (2023)
- Scientific career
- Fields: Neurology, Genetics
- Institutions: Icahn School of Medicine; Washington University in St. Louis

Alison Mary Goate is the Jean C. and James W. Crystal Professor and Chair of the Department of Genetics and Genomic Sciences and Director of the Loeb Center for Alzheimer's Disease at Icahn School of Medicine at Mount Sinai. She was previously professor of genetics in psychiatry, professor of genetics, and professor of neurology at Washington University School of Medicine.

The Goate Lab studies the genetics and molecular bases of Alzheimer's disease, frontotemporal dementia, and alcoholism.

== Education and early career ==
After receiving her undergraduate degree in biochemistry at the University of Bristol (UK) and her graduate training at Oxford University (UK), Goate studied under Professors Theodore Puck, Professor Louis Lim and Dr. John Hardy. She received a Royal Society University Research Fellowship to conduct research at St. Mary's Hospital Medical School in London.

== Awards and affiliations ==
She has received the Potamkin Prize from the American Academy of Neurology (1993), the Zenith Award from the Alzheimer's Association, Senior Investigator Award from the Metropolitan Life Foundation, the St. Louis Academy of Science Innovation Award, Carl and Gerty Cori Faculty Achievement Award at Washington University in St. Louis (1994), and a Lifetime Achievement Award from the Alzheimer's Association (2015). She is a fellow of the American Association for the Advancement of Science. She also serves on the faculty of the Hope Center for Neurological Disorders and is an elected member of the National Academy of Medicine. Goate received the Rainwater Prize for Innovation in Neurodegeneration from the Rainwater Charitable Foundation in 2022. Goate was the first female to be awarded the Piepenbrock-DZNE Prize for Neurodegenerative disease research in 2023.

== Research ==
Goate's research centers on the genetics of Alzheimer's disease and related dementias that led to the development of animal and cellular models and the development of anti-amyloid and anti-tau therapies. She has been the principal investigator on four grants and has co-invented and awarded six patents.

=== Patents ===
- APP770 mutant in alzheimer's disease, (1999).
- Mutant S182 genes, (1999).
- Method for elucidation and detection of polymorphisms, splice variants, and proximal coding mutations using intronic sequences of the Alzheimer's S182 gene, (2000).
- Transgenic mouse expressing an APP-FAD DNA sequence, (2001).
- Pathogenic Tau mutations, (2002).
- Markers for addiction, (2011).

=== Grants ===
Partial list:

Funding Source, Project Title & Number	Role in Project	Dates	Direct Costs
NIH/NIA/Columbia University National Institute on Aging Alzheimer's Disease Family-Based Study (NIA-AD FBS) U24AG056270	Subaward PI (MPI)	8/1/2022 - 4/30/2027	$151,653
NIH/NIA Neuroprotective Signaling and Transcriptional Pathways in Microglia Associated with Alzheimer's Disease R01AG072489	MPI	2/1/2022 - 11/30/2026	$5,972,363
NIH/NINDS Uncovering the Genetic Mechanisms of the Chromosome 17q21.31 Tau haplotype on Neurodegeneration Risk in FTD and PSP U54NS123746	MPI	9/1/2021 - 8/31/2026	$9,278,441
The JPB Foundation Integrative approaches to the identification of AD risk genes and novel therapeutics 2023-4265	Principal Investigator	9/1/2023 - 8/31/2026	$2,250,000
NIH/NIA/Mayo Clinic Biology and Pathobiology of ApoE in Aging and Alzheimer's Disease U19AG069701	Subaward PI (MPI)	6/1/2021 - 5/31/2026	$1,885,527
Cure Alzheimer's Foundation Investigating MEF2C transcription factor as therapeutic targets to reprogram pathological microglial states in Alzheimer's disease	Principal Investigator	1/14/2024 - 1/13/2026	$201,250
Rainwater Charitable Foundation Using unbiased proteomics to validate iPSC models of FTD-MAPT and discover novel biomarkers	MPI	8/1/2023 - 7/31/2025	$200,000
NIH/NIA/Massachusetts Institute of Technology Development of PU.1 Inhibitory Modulators as Novel Therapeutics for Alzheimer's Disease U01AG066757	Subaward PI (MPI)	5/15/2020 - 4/30/2025	$1,364,375
NIH/NIA/Banner Health APOE in the Predisposition to, Protection from and Prevention of Alzheimer's Disease R01AG069453	Subaward PI (MPI)	7/1/2020 - 3/31/2025	$71,390
NIH/NIA/University of Pennsylvania Alzheimer's Disease Genetics Consortium U01AG032984	Subaward PI	3/6/2020 - 8/31/2024	$1,021,752
NIH/NINDS/University of Miami Reducing Disparities in Dementia and VCID Outcomes in a Multicultural Rural Population R01NS101483	Subaward PI	4/15/2020 - 3/31/2025	$78,593
NIH/NIAAA/SUNY Collaborative Study on the Genetics of Alcoholism (COGA) U10AA008401	Subaward PI	9/1/2019 - 8/31/2024	$2,175,426
M.D. Anderson Understanding the mechanism of MS4A-dependent AD risk AGR-13139	Principal Investigator	8/7/2017 - 8/31/2024	$3,562,500
NIH/NIA Genomic Approach to Identification of Microglial Networks Involved in Alzheimer's Disease Risk U01AG058635	Principal Investigator	8/1/2018 - 7/31/2024	$4,799,685
NIH/NIA/Washington University DIAN Genetics Core U19AG032438	Subaward PI and Core Leader	7/1/2019 - 6/30/2024	$651,291
Rainwater Charitable Foundation Investigating rare and common mechanisms underlying tauopathy risk	Principal Investigator	11/1/2022 - 4/30/2024	$230,000

== Publications ==
Semantic Scholar lists 483 publications, 22,943 citations and 1,808 influential citations of Goate's peer-reviewed and original contribution as of 2019.

Partial list:

- Goate, A.; et al. (1991). "Segregation of a missense mutation in the amyloid precursor protein gene with familial Alzheimer's disease". Nature. 349 (6311): 704–706. Bibcode:1991Natur.349..704G. doi:10.1038/349704a0. PMID 1671712. S2CID 4336069. Cited by 5017 as of October 18, 2019.
- De Strooper, B.; et al. (1999). "A presenilin-1-dependent gamma-secretase-like protease mediates release of Notch intracellular domain". Nature. 398 (6727): 518–22. Bibcode:1999Natur.398..518D. doi:10.1038/19083. PMID 10206645. S2CID 4346474. Cited by 2274 as of October 18, 2019.
- Saccone, S. F.; et al. (2007). "Cholinergic nicotinic receptor genes implicated in a nicotine dependence association study targeting 348 candidate genes with 3713 SNPS". Human Molecular Genetics. 16 (1): 36–49. doi:10.1093/hmg/ddl438. PMC 2270437. PMID 17135278. Cited by 793 as of October 18, 2019
- Bierut, L. J.; et al. (2007). "Novel genes identified in a high-density genome wide association study for nicotine dependence". Human Molecular Genetics. 16 (1): 24–35. doi:10.1093/hmg/ddl441. PMC 2278047. PMID 17158188. Cited by 604 as of October 18, 2019.
- Kehoe, P.; et al. (1999). "A full genome scan for late onset Alzheimer's disease". Human Molecular Genetics. 8 (2): 237–45. doi:10.1093/hmg/8.2.237. PMID 9931331. Cited by 419 as of October 18, 2019
- Foroud, T.; et al. (2000). "Alcoholism susceptibility loci: Confirmation studies in a replicate sample and further mapping". Alcoholism: Clinical and Experimental Research. 24 (7): 933–45. doi:10.1111/j.1530-0277.2000.tb04634.x. PMID 10923994. Cited by 275 as of October 18, 2019.
- Bierut, LJ (2012). "ADH1B is associated with alcohol dependence and alcohol consumption in populations of European and African ancestry". Mol Psychiatry. 17 (4): 445–450. doi:10.1038/mp.2011.124. PMC 3252425. PMID 21968928..
- Hutton, M; Lendon, CL; Rizzu, P; Baker, M; Froelich, S; Houlden, H; Pickering-Brown, S; Chakraverty, S; Isaacs, A; Grover, A; Hackett, J; Adamson, J; Lincoln, S; Dickson, D; Davies, P; Petersen, RC; Stevens, M; de Graaff, E; Wauters, E; van Baren, J; Hillebrand, M; Joosse, M; Kwon, JM; Nowotny, P; Che, LK; Norton, J; Morris, JC; Reed, LA; Trojanowski, J; Basun, H; Lannfelt, L; Neystat, M; Fahn, S; Dark, F; Tannenberg, T; Dodd, PR; Hayward, N; Kwok, JB; Schofield, PR; Andreadis, A; Snowden, J; Craufurd, D; Neary, D; Owen, F; Oostra, BA; Hardy, J; Goate, A; van Swieten, J; Mann, D; Lynch, T; Heutink, P (1998). "Association of missense and 5'-splice-site mutations in tau with the inherited dementia FTDP-17". Nature. 393 (6686): 702–5. Bibcode:1998Natur.393..702H. doi:10.1038/31508. PMID 9641683..
- Gitcho, M. A.; Baloh, R. H.; Chakraverty, S.; Mayo, K.; Norton, J. B.; Levitch, D.; Hatanpaa, K. J.; White Cl, 3rd; Bigio, E. H.; Caselli, R.; Baker, M.; Al-Lozi, M. T.; Morris, J. C.; Pestronk, A.; Rademakers, R.; Goate, A. M.; Cairns, N. J. (2008). "TDP-43 A315T mutation in familial motor neuron disease". Annals of Neurology. 63 (4): 535–538. doi:10.1002/ana.21344. PMC 2747362. PMID 18288693.
- Kauwe, John S. K.; Cruchaga, Carlos; Mayo, Kevin; Fenoglio, Chiara; Bertelsen, Sarah; Nowotny, Petra; Galimberti, Daniela; Scarpini, Elio; Morris, John C.; Fagan, Anne M.; Holtzman, David M.; Goate, Alison M. (2008). "Variation in MAPT is associated with cerebrospinal fluid tau levels in the presence of amyloid-beta deposition". Proceedings of the National Academy of Sciences. 105 (23): 8050–8054. Bibcode:2008PNAS..105.8050K. doi:10.1073/pnas.0801227105. PMC 2430357. PMID 18541914.
- Bierut, L. J.; et al. (2008). "Variants in nicotinic receptors and risk for nicotine dependence". The American Journal of Psychiatry. 165 (9): 1163–1171. doi:10.1176/appi.ajp.2008.07111711. PMC 2574742. PMID 18519524.
- Guerreiro, R (2013). "TREM2 Variants in Alzheimer's Disease". NEJM. 368 (2): 117–127. doi:10.1056/NEJMoa1211851. PMC 3631573. PMID 23150934.
- Cruchaga, C (2013). "GWAS of Cerebrospinal Fluid Tau Levels Identifies Risk Variants for Alzheimer's Disease". Neuron. 78 (2): 256–268. doi:10.1016/j.neuron.2013.02.026. PMC 3664945. PMID 23562540.
- Cruchaga, C (2014). "Rare coding variants in the phospholipase D3 gene confer risk for Alzheimer's disease". Nature. 505 (7484): 550–554. doi:10.1038/nature12825. PMC 4050701. PMID 24336208.
- Kauwe, JS (2014). "Genome-Wide Association Study of CSF Levels of 59 Alzheimer's Disease Candidate Proteins: Significant Associations with Proteins Involved in Amyloid Processing and Inflammation". PLOS Genetics. 10 (10) e1004758. doi:10.1371/journal.pgen.1004758. PMC 4207667. PMID 25340798.
- Huang, Kuan-lin; et al. (2017). "A common haplotype lowers PU.1 expression in myeloid cells and delays onset of Alzheimer's disease". Nature Neuroscience. 20 (8): 1052–1061. doi:10.1038/nn.4587. PMC 5759334. PMID 28628103.
- Kapoor, Manav; Wang, Jen-Chyong; Farris, Sean P.; Liu, Yunlong; McClintick, Jeanette; Gupta, Ishaan; Meyers, Jacquelyn L.; Bertelsen, Sarah; Chao, Michael; Nurnberger, John; Tischfield, Jay; Harari, Oscar; Zeran, Li; Hesselbrock, Victor; Bauer, Lance; Raj, Towfique; Porjesz, Bernice; Agrawal, Arpana; Foroud, Tatiana; Edenberg, Howard J.; Mayfield, R. Dayne; Goate, Alison (2019). "Analysis of whole genome-transcriptomic organization in brain to identify genes associated with alcoholism". Translational Psychiatry. 9 (1): 89. doi:10.1038/s41398-019-0384-y. hdl:20.500.12648/7935. PMC 6376002. PMID 30765688.
- Novikova, G; Kapoor, M; Tcw, J; Abud, EM; Efthymiou, AG; Chen, SX; Cheng, H; Fullard, JF; Bendl, J; Liu, Y; Roussos, P; Björkegren, JL; Liu, Y; Poon, WW; Hao, K; Marcora, E; Goate, AM (2021). "Integration of Alzheimer's disease genetics and myeloid genomics identifies disease risk regulatory elements and genes". Nat Commun. 12 (1): 1610. Bibcode:2021NatCo..12.1610N. doi:10.1038/s41467-021-21823-y. PMC 7955030. PMID 33712570..
- Kapoor, M; Chao, MJ; Johnson, EC; Novikova, G; Lai, D; Meyers, JL; Schulman, J; Nurnberger, JI Jr; Porjesz, B; Liu, Y; Foroud, T; Edenberg, HJ; Marcora, E; Agrawal, A; Goate, A (2021). "Multi-omics integration analysis identifies novel genes for alcoholism with potential overlap with neurodegenerative diseases". Nat Commun. 12 (1): 5071. Bibcode:2021NatCo..12.5071K. doi:10.1038/s41467-021-25392-y. PMC 8379159. PMID 34417470..
- Bowles, KR; Silva, MC; Whitney, K; Bertucci, T; Berlind, JE; Lai, JD; Garza, JC; Boles, NC; Mahali, S; Strang, KH; Marsh, JA; Chen, C; Pugh, DA; Liu, Y; Gordon, RE; Goderie, SK; Chowdhury, R; Lotz, S; Lane, K; Crary, JF; Haggarty, SJ; Karch, CM; Ichida, JK; Goate, AM; Temple, S (2021). "ELAVL4, splicing, and glutamatergic dysfunction precede neuron loss in MAPT mutation cerebral organoids". Cell. 184 (17): 4547–4563.e17. doi:10.1016/j.cell.2021.07.003. PMC 8635409. PMID 34314701..
- Tcw, J; Qian, L; Pipalia, NH; Chao, MJ; Liang, SA; Shi, Y; Jain, BR; Bertelsen, SE; Kapoor, M; Marcora, E; Sikora, E; Andrews, EJ; Martini, AC; Karch, CM; Head, E; Holtzman, DM; Zhang, B; Wang, M; Maxfield, FR; Poon, WW; Goate, AM (2022). "Cholesterol and matrisome pathways dysregulated in astrocytes and microglia". Cell. 185 (13): 2213–2233.e25. doi:10.1016/j.cell.2022.05.017. PMC 9340815. PMID 35750033..
- Podleśny-Drabiniok, A; Novikova, G; Liu, Y; Dunst, J; Temizer, R; Giannarelli, C; Marro, S; Kreslavsky, T; Marcora, E; Goate, AM (2024). "BHLHE40/41 regulate microglia and peripheral macrophage responses associated with Alzheimer's disease and other disorders of lipid-rich tissues". Nat Commun. 15 (1): 2058. Bibcode:2024NatCo..15.2058P. doi:10.1038/s41467-024-46315-7. PMC 10917780. PMID 38448474..
