= Peter St George-Hyslop =

British-Canadian neurologist and neuroscientist

Professor Peter St George-Hyslop OC FRS FRSC FRCPC FMedSci

Belle and Murray Nathan Professor of Neurology, Columbia University
- Incumbent
- Assumed office 2022

Professor of Experimental Neuroscience, University of Cambridge
- In office 2007–2022

Personal details
- Born: Peter Henry St George-Hyslop; 10 July 1953 (age 72)

Peter Henry St George-Hyslop (born July 10, 1953) is a British and Canadian medical scientist, neurologist and molecular geneticist who is known for his research into neurodegenerative diseases. St George-Hyslop is one of the most cited authors in the field of Alzheimer's disease research. His research has included the discovery of several genes responsible for the nerve cell degeneration involved in Alzheimer's disease.

== Family ==
St George-Hyslop's father, Noel St George Hyslop was a scientist who worked on Foot and Mouth Disease virus.

== Career ==
Educated at Wellington School, Wellington, Somerset, UK, St George-Hyslop completed his medical training in Canada, graduating with the MD degree in 1976, and then pursuing post-doctoral research in internal medicine and neurology at the University of Ottawa and the University of Toronto and Harvard Medical School. He served his first appointment at Harvard's Massachusetts General Hospital, where he taught molecular genetics and neurology from 1987 to 1991. He was appointed to the University of Toronto in 1991, and since 2003 has held the university's highest rank of University Professor. From 1995 to 2018, St George-Hyslop served as the director of the Tanz Centre for Research in Neurodegenerative Diseases at the University of Toronto Faculty of Medicine. In 2007, St George-Hyslop was appointed Professor of Experimental Neuroscience at the University of Cambridge. Since 2007 St George-Hyslop has headed an Alzheimer's disease research program as Professor of Experimental Neuroscience at the University of Cambridge.

== Research ==
He has identified a number of key genes that are responsible for nerve cell degeneration and early-onset forms of Alzheimer's disease. These include the discovery of the presenilins (PSEN1 and PSEN2), Nicastrin, TREM2, Apolipoprotein E and SORL1 genes. Presenilin mutations are the most common cause of familial Alzheimer's disease. St George-Hyslop also co-led the discovery of the gene for the amyloid precursor protein.

== Awards and honours ==
He was awarded the Metlife Foundation Award for Medical Research in Alzheimer's Disease in 1987, the Howard Hughes Medical Institute International Scholar Award in 1997 and 2002, the Gold Medal in Medicine from the Royal College of Physicians of Canada in 1994, the Michael Smith Award from the Canadian Institutes of Health Research in 1997 and the Dan David Prize in 2014. He is a member of the American Society for Clinical Investigation, a fellow of the Royal Society of London and the Royal Society of Canada, and a Foreign Member to the Institute of Medicine of the United States National Academies. He was elected a Fellow of the Academy of Medical Sciences in 2009. He was appointed Officer of the Order of Canada in 2018.
