= Noel St George Hyslop =

Lt.-Col. Noel St George Hyslop, TD (20 April 1921 – 1979) was a British physician, veterinary surgeon and public health officer.

Hyslop was born in Mirfield, Yorkshire, on 20 April 1921. He served in World War II in North Africa and the Middle East in several regiments of the British Army including the Royal Artillery, Cameron Highlanders and London Scottish, achieving the rank of lieutenant colonel. He was awarded the Territorial Decoration (TD).

Following the war, he qualified in medicine from the University of Liverpool in 1951, and then joined the Colonial Service and served in Kenya from 1952 to 1957.

In 1957, he joined the School of Tropical Medicine at the University of Edinburgh and then became senior lecturer in the Department of Veterinary Medicine, University of Bristol, where he taught clinical pathology and the microbiology of infectious diseases. Later he joined the Animal Virus Research Institute, Pirbright, as head of the Inactivated Vaccine Research Unit.

He immigrated to Canada in 1968, where he was named head of the Immunology Section at Canada's Animal Diseases Research Institute. At the time of his death, he was acting director (Western Laboratories) in the Animal Pathology Division of the Department of Health. He was editor-in-chief of the International Journal of Biometeorology, and chairman of the Permanent Committee on the Effects of Climate and Weather on Diseases of Animals.

Hyslop published numerous scientific articles which contributed major insights to the spread of viral diseases, and in particular to the spread of Foot and Mouth Disease (FMD) Virus. His work on spreading of FMD was the basis for national agriculture policies in Canada and UK for handling outbreaks of FMD and other viral diseases in livestock.

He also contributed a novel method of virus purification which was used in the isolation of the FMD virus by his colleague Fred Brown FRS. He was a Fellow of the Royal Society of Medicine, Fellow of the Royal College of Veterinary Surgeons and a fellow of the Royal Society of Health, as well as several other scientific and professional organizations.

His son, Peter St George-Hyslop, professor of experimental neuroscience at the University of Cambridge and the University of Toronto, is known for his work on Alzheimer's disease.

== Sources ==
- Hare W (1980). "In memoriam Dr. Noel St. George Hyslop T.D., F.R.C.V.S., M.V.Sc., D.T.V.M. 1921–1979". Int. J. Biometeorol. 24 (1): 1–2. Bibcode:1980IJBm...24....1H. doi:10.1007/BF02245535. S2CID 84874258.
- Borel Y, Kilham L, Hyslop N, Borel H (May 1976). "Isologous IgG-induced tolerance to benzyl penicilloyl". Nature. 261 (5555): 49–50. Bibcode:1976Natur.261...49B. doi:10.1038/261049a0. PMID 1272373. S2CID 4191178.
- Hyslop NS (July 1961). "A method of treating asbestos filter pads for virus filtration". Nature. 191 (4785): 305–7. Bibcode:1961Natur.191..305H. doi:10.1038/191305b0. PMID 13717180. S2CID 4181007.
