= Rumi Chunara =

American computer scientist

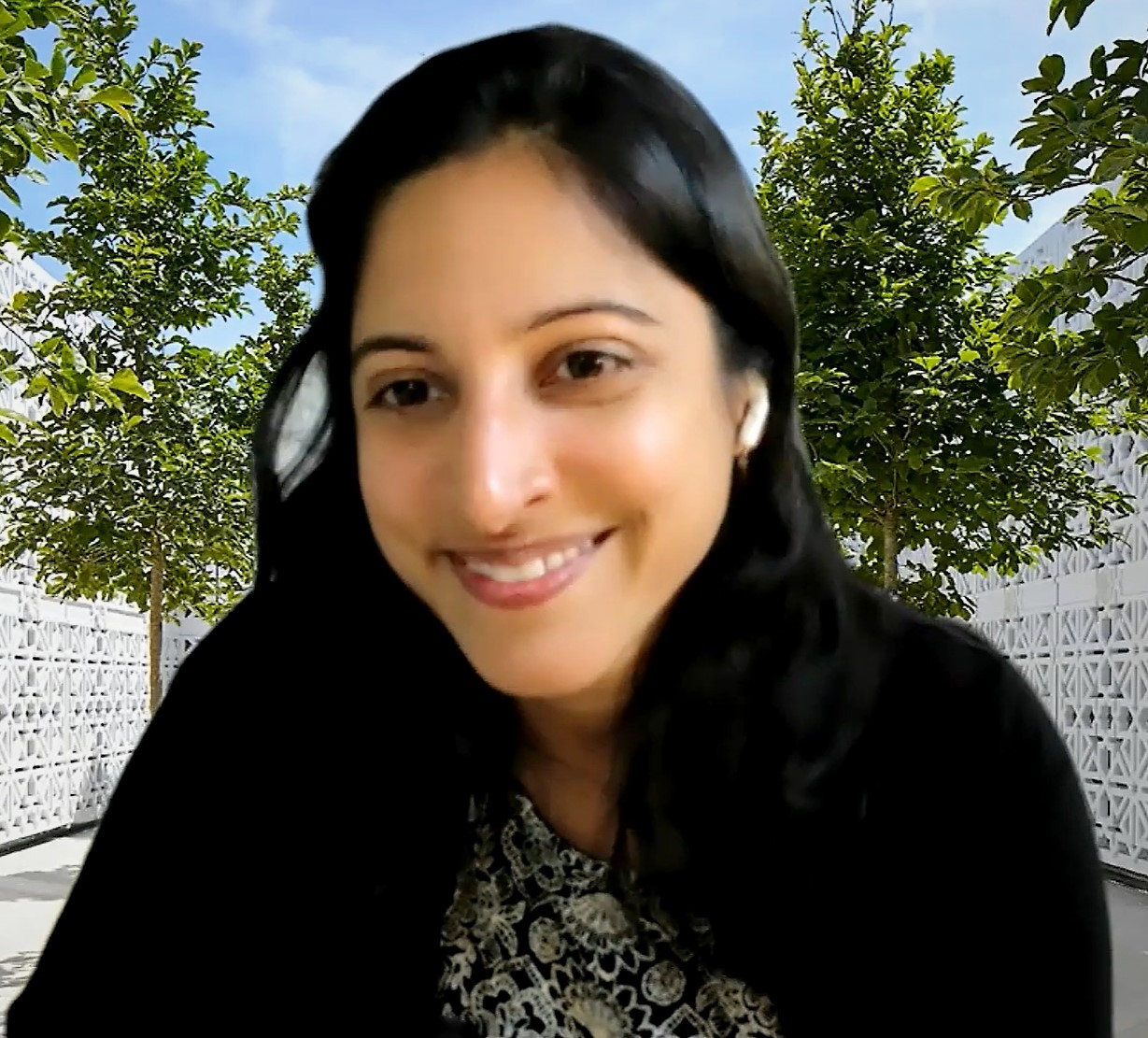
- Chunara speaks to Australia National University in 2017
- Education: California Institute of Technology (BS); Massachusetts Institute of Technology (MS, PhD)
- Awards: National Science Foundation CAREER Award (2019)
- Scientific career
- Fields: Machine learning; Artificial intelligence; Public health; Health disparities; Social computing
- Institutions: New York University; Harvard Medical School
- Thesis: Electronic readout of microchannel resonators for precision mass sensing in solution (2010)
- Doctoral advisor: Scott Manalis
- Website: Chunara Lab

Rumi Chunara is a computer scientist who is an associate professor of biostatistics at the New York University School of Global Public Health. She develops computational and statistical approaches to acquire, integrate and make use of data improve population-level public health.

== Early life and education ==
Chunara was an undergraduate student at the California Institute of Technology, where she studied electrical engineering. She moved to the Massachusetts Institute of Technology for graduate studies, where she joined the Department of Electrical Engineering. Her master's dissertation investigated the creation of low-noise electronic readouts for high-throughput bimolecular detection. Chunara joined the Harvard–MIT Program in Health Sciences and Technology, where she completed her doctoral research supervised by Scott Manalis.

== Research and career ==
Chunara worked at the Boston Children's Hospital and Harvard Medical School. Chunara joined the faculty at New York University in 2015. Her research makes use of data mining as well as the development of machine learning algorithms. She is particularly interested in how the acquisition of data can be used to better support public health decisions, and how ethics should be considered in the design of computational systems.

She has shown that it is possible to make use of social media and online sources to understand public health and emerging disease outbreaks. In parts of the world, it can take weeks for public health information to be aggregated by health ministries. In these contexts, early warning signs of disease outbreak can be essential in directing medical workers and resources to areas of need. She demonstrated that an increase in cholera-related Twitter posts in Haiti correlated with a Cholera outbreak. In India, Chunara offered $0.02 rewards to people who completed a malaria survey, the outcomes of which informed the design and deployment of diagnostic kits.

Chunara co-developed Flu Near You, a website that makes use of person-generated information to create spatially resolved maps of the prevalence of flu. Flu Near You emphasizes that it is possible to obtain useful public health information in the absence of public health officials. In 2018, the Bill & Melinda Gates Foundation supported Chunara to improve vaccination rates in Pakistan through the development of smart immunization targeting. Chunara combined artificial intelligence with cell phone technologies to direct vaccinators to areas of poor coverage. Chunara has also shown that hate speech on social media can be used to predict hate crimes in the real world.

In an effort to understand whether disparities in accessing telemedicine reflected in-person healthcare access, Chunara studied the use of telemedicine during the COVID-19 pandemic. She found that COVID diagnoses were considerably more likely for Black telemedicine patients as opposed to white patients. She found that telemedicine use was related to mean income and household size. Later that year she was supported by the National Institutes of Health (NIH) to train public health focused data scientists in Kenya.

=== Selected publications ===
- Devin M Mann; Ji Chen; Rumi Chunara; Paul Testa; Oded Nov (23 April 2020). "COVID-19 transforms health care through telemedicine: evidence from the field". Journal of the American Medical Informatics Association. doi:10.1093/JAMIA/OCAA072. ISSN 1067-5027. PMC 7188161. PMID 32324855. Wikidata Q93179928.
- Rumi Chunara; Jason R. Andrews; John S. Brownstein (1 January 2012). "Social and news media enable estimation of epidemiological patterns early in the 2010 Haitian cholera outbreak" (PDF). American Journal of Tropical Medicine and Hygiene. 86 (1): 39–45. doi:10.4269/AJTMH.2012.11-0597. ISSN 0002-9637. PMC 3247107. PMID 22232449. Wikidata Q34246068.
- Clark C Freifeld; Rumi Chunara; Sumiko R Mekaru; Emily H Chan; Taha Kass-Hout; Anahi Ayala Iacucci; John Brownstein (7 December 2010). "Participatory epidemiology: use of mobile phones for community-based health reporting". PLOS Medicine. 7 (12) e1000376. doi:10.1371/JOURNAL.PMED.1000376. ISSN 1549-1277. PMC 2998443. PMID 21151888. Wikidata Q28744399.

=== Awards and honors ===
In 2014, MIT Technology Review selected Chunara as one of their Innovators Under 35. Chunara was awarded a National Science Foundation CAREER Award in 2019 and a Max Planck Sabbatical Award in 2021. In 2025, Chunara was elected an ACM Distinguished Member.
