= Irving London =

American geneticist

Irving M. London
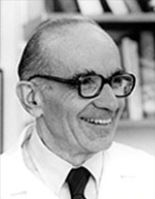
- Born: 24 July 1918; Malden, Massachusetts, U.S.
- Died: 23 May 2018 (aged 99)
- Education: Harvard University; Hebrew College; Harvard Medical School
- Known for: Molecular regulation of hemoglobin synthesis
- Awards: Theobald Smith Award in Medical Sciences of the American Association for the Advancement of Science (1953)
- Scientific career
- Fields: Health Sciences and Technology
- Workplaces: Harvard University; Massachusetts Institute of Technology

Irving M. London (July 24, 1918 – May 23, 2018) was a hematologist and geneticist. He was an associate professor of medicine at Columbia University College of Physicians and Surgeons when he was selected to be the founding chair of the department of medicine at the Albert Einstein College of Medicine in 1955. He was recruited to become the founding director of the Harvard-MIT Program in Health Sciences and Technology in 1970. Dr. London was the first professor to hold dual roles at both Harvard and MIT.

London graduated from Harvard College and Harvard Medical School. London died on May 23, 2018, at age 99.

== Family and early life ==
London was born in Malden, Massachusetts on 24 July 1918. His parents identified as Russian Jewish. His mother may have been named Rose London (1892-1944), and a sister named Marion.

In his childhood years, London had polio. He completed his primary and secondary education at Malden Public Schools in Massachusetts.

While in college, London worked at a library on a salary funded by the National Youth Administration as part of the New Deal during the Great Depression era.

London married Huguette Piedzicki. They met in Paris and maintained a long-distance relationship until marriage. They had two Children, Robb and David, and many extended family members.

== Career ==
London graduated from Harvard College in 1939 summa cum laude. He was on a student committee at Harvard that gave 14 refugee students the opportunity to leave Nazi-occupied Europe to study in Boston. London also earned a second undergraduate degree from Hebrew College in Roxbury at the same time. London delivered the graduating address at Harvard, the content of which was inspired by his thesis "The Jeffersonian Tradition in American Nationalism". London gave serious thought to attending law school after graduation, but ultimately chose to enroll in medical school.

After completing an MD from HMS in 1943, Dr. London accepted an internship at Columbia-Presbyterian Medical Center in New York. During World War II he served as a US Army captain in the Medical Corps where he conducted research on the use of chloroquine as an antimalarial medication. After the war, he was assigned to Bikini Atoll in the Marshall Islands of the South Pacific Ocean to serve a physician at the atomic bomb testing.

London returned to New York City after the war to continue residency training. Upon completion, he joined the department of biochemistry at Columbia University College of Physicians & Surgeons and was promoted to faculty, teaching and tenure. His research focused on the lifespan of red blood cells in normal and pathological conditions. In 1954, he was selected to be the founding chair of the department of medicine at the Albert Einstein College of Medicine, and was director of medical services at Bronx Municipal Hospital until 1970.

In 1968, London was invited as a consultant to planning for the Massachusetts Institute of Technology and Harvard Medical School joint program. In 1970 he accepted a position a director of the new Harvard-MIT Program in Health Sciences and Technology, and around 1972 he was also a physician at Peter Bent Brigham Hospital. London served as director of the program until 1985 while simultaneously a professor of medicine at HMS and a professor of biology at MIT.

== Awards and achievements ==
London is best known for groundbreaking explanation for the molecular regulation (gene transcription and translation) of hemoglobin synthesis. London and colleagues demonstrated that hemoglobin is the endogenous source of bilirubin, an important event in the fields of jaundice and heme oxygenase research.

- Welch Fellowship in Internal Medicine of the National Academy of Sciences 1949-1952
- Theobald Smith Award in Medical Sciences of the American Association for the Advancement of Science 1953
- Commonwealth Fund Fellowship at Institut Pasteur 1962-1963
- election to American Academy of Arts and Sciences 1963
- charter member in the Institute of Medicine of the National Academy of Sciences in 1970
- elected member National Academy of Science 1971
- board of directors for Biosciences Advisory Committee for Johnson & Johnson 1982-2003
- establishment of The Irving M. London Society (HST) at Harvard Medical School
- The Dr. Irving M. London Teaching Award, initiated in 1986
