= Rare Dementia Support =

UK-based support service

Rare Dementia Support (RDS) is a UK-based support service for people affected by rare dementias, provided by the UCL Dementia Research Centre (DRC) at the UCL Queen Square Institute of Neurology and funded by The National Brain Appeal. Described by the National Brain Appeal as a global model of how best to support those living with a rare dementia, it supports over 8,000 members across seven rare dementia conditions, offering free information, advice, and support from pre-diagnosis through to post-bereavement care.

== History ==
Rare Dementia Support originated as a single nurse-led support group founded in 1994 at the UCL Dementia Research Centre, initially serving people affected by frontotemporal dementia (FTD), then known as Pick's disease. The group's work was closely linked to clinical practice at the DRC.

Carol Jennings, the Alzheimer's disease campaigner whose family's involvement in research led to the discovery of the London Mutation, served as an early support adviser to the group in the mid-1990s, working alongside Penelope Roques and Jill Walton, years before the organisation formally came into existence.

The support group expanded over subsequent years. The Myrtle Ellis Fund, established by a supporter of The National Brain Appeal, extended provision to people living with posterior cortical atrophy (PCA). With additional funding from The National Brain Appeal and The Discworld Foundation, the FTD support group and the Myrtle Ellis Fund merged, bringing together support for five conditions: FTD, familial FTD (fFTD), PCA, primary progressive aphasia (PPA), and familial Alzheimer's disease (FAD).

In 2015, the UCL Dementia Research Centre and The National Brain Appeal established an advisory committee to provide strategic direction across the support groups. The fund for the unified organisation was launched on Rare Disease Day, 29 February 2016. A Lewy body dementia (LBD) support group was incorporated in 2018, and a Young-onset Alzheimer's disease (YOAD) support group was launched in 2021.

== Services ==
RDS supports people affected by seven rare dementias: familial Alzheimer's disease (FAD), frontotemporal dementia (FTD), familial frontotemporal dementia (fFTD), posterior cortical atrophy (PCA), primary progressive aphasia (PPA), Lewy body dementia (LBD), and Young-onset Alzheimer's disease (YOAD). A dedicated Direct Support Team provides free information, advice, and support for members, and the organisation runs around 16 support groups in London and 30 regionally.

RDS was the subject of a major research programme funded by the Economic and Social Research Council (ESRC), part of UK Research and Innovation, awarded £3,801,333 for the period 2019 to 2024 (project reference ES/S010467/1). Led by Professor Sebastian Crutch at the UCL Institute of Neurology, the study examined the value and effectiveness of multicomponent support groups for people living with rare dementias, including telephone-based interviews with over 1,000 RDS members across the UK and Canada, a longitudinal follow-up study, and the development of an online video-based support forum for carers of people with frontotemporal dementia.

In 2021, RDS received a Disruption Award from The Dementia Trust for a project led by Dr Chris Hardy of the UCL Institute of Neurology, redefining expertise in rare dementia through recorded conversations between clinical specialists and people with lived experience of rare dementias.

== The Hilary and Galen Weston Rare Dementia Support Centre ==
The National Brain Appeal led a £9.9 million capital appeal to establish a permanent specialist centre for people with rare forms of dementia in Woburn Square, central London, in partnership with UCL. The purchase of two interconnected buildings was made possible by a £2.7 million donation from The Hilary and Galen Weston Foundation, with further support from the Garfield Weston Foundation, Iceland Foods Charitable Foundation, the Wolfson Foundation, the B&H Foundation, Rosetrees Trust, Alzheimer's Society, and UCLH Charity.

In recognition of its founding donation, the centre was named The Hilary and Galen Weston Rare Dementia Support Centre. Professor Nick Fox, co-director of the centre, described it as "a world-first," noting that rare dementias are "significantly under-served by existing services."

The centre is undergoing redevelopment based on dementia-friendly design principles, creating a welcoming environment with a substantial kitchen at its heart, lounge areas for larger group discussions, smaller consultation rooms, and dedicated spaces for physical, artistic and cultural activities. In its first year after opening, RDS anticipates nearly 10,000 unique visits to the centre.
