= Marcus Raichle =

American neurologist

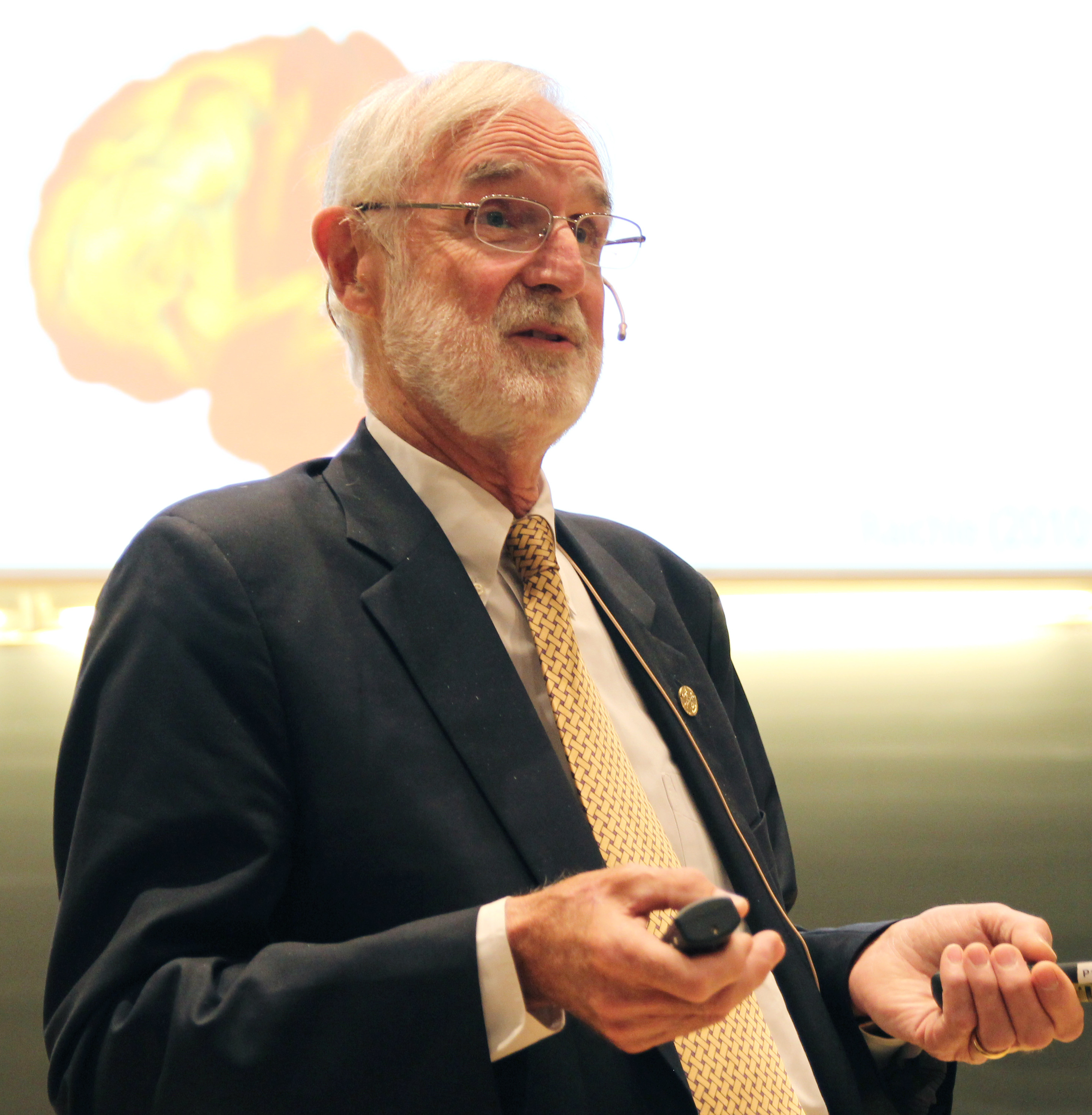
- Raichle in 2014
- Born: March 15, 1937 (age 89); Hoquiam, Washington
- Known for: default mode, functional neuroimaging
- Awards: Karl Spencer Lashley Award (1998); Grawemeyer Award in Psychology (2001); Kavli Prize in Neuroscience (2014)
- Scientific career
- Fields: Neuroimaging
- Workplaces: Washington University in St. Louis

Marcus E. Raichle (born March 15, 1937) is an American neurologist at the Washington University School of Medicine in St. Louis. He is a professor in the Department of Radiology with joint appointments in Neurology, Neurobiology and Biomedical Engineering. His research over the past 40 years has focused on the nature of functional brain imaging signals arising from PET and fMRI and the application of these techniques to the study of the human brain in health and disease. He received the Kavli Prize in Neuroscience "for the discovery of specialized brain networks for memory and cognition", together with Brenda Milner and John O'Keefe in 2014.

== Career ==
Noteworthy accomplishments of Marcus Raichle include the discovery of the relative independence of blood flow and oxygen consumption during changes in brain activity which provided the physiological basis of fMRI; the discovery of a default mode network of brain function (i.e., organized intrinsic activity) and its signature system, the brain's default mode network; and, the discovery that aerobic glycolysis contributes to brain function independent of oxidative phosphorylation.

== Honors ==
- Member: National Academy of Sciences, National Academy of Medicine, American Academy of Arts and Sciences
- Foreign member: The Norwegian Academy of Science and Letters
- Fellow: American Association for the Advancement of Science

== Awards ==
In 2001, he was a co-recipient of a Grawemeyer Award in Psychology, with Michael Posner and Steven Petersen of the University of Louisville. In 2010, he was awarded the Metlife Foundation Award for Medical Research in Alzheimer's Disease along with Randy Buckner, and the Ariëns Kappers Medal from the Royal Netherlands Academy of Arts and Sciences. In 2014, he was a co-recipient of the Kavli Prize in Neuroscience, awarded by the Norwegian Academy of Science and Letters, with Brenda Milner of the Montreal Neurological Institute at McGill University and John O'Keefe of University College London.

== Selected publications ==
- Zhang, D; Snyder AZ; Shimony JS; Fox MD; Raichle ME (2010). "Noninvasive functional and structural connectivity mapping of the human thalamocortical system". Cerebral Cortex. 20 (5): 1187–1194. doi:10.1093/cercor/bhp182. PMC 2852505. PMID 19729393.
- Fair DA, Bathula D, Mills KL, Costa Dias TG, Blythe MS, Zhang D, Snyder AZ, Raichle ME, Stevens AA, Nigg JT, Nagel BJ (2010). "thalamocortical functional connectivity across development". Frontiers in Systems Neuroscience. 4: 1–10. doi:10.3389/fnsys.2010.00010. PMC 2876871. PMID 20514143.
- He, BJ; Zempel JM; Snyder AZ; Raichle ME (2010). "The temporal structures and functional significance of scale-free brain activity". Neuron. 66 (3): 353–369. doi:10.1016/j.neuron.2010.04.020. PMC 2878725. PMID 20471349.
- Raichle, ME (2010). "Two views of brain function". Trends in Cognitive Sciences. 14 (4): 180–190. doi:10.1016/j.tics.2010.01.008. PMID 20206576. S2CID 15157559.
- Raichle, ME (2010). "The brain's dark energy". Scientific American. 302 (3): 28–33. Bibcode:2010SciAm.302c..44R. doi:10.1038/scientificamerican0310-44. PMID 20184182.
- Paul, BM; Snyder AZ; Haist F; Raichle ME; Bellugi U; Stiles J (2009). "Amygdala response to faces parallels social behavior in Williams syndrome". Social Cognitive and Affective Neuroscience. 4 (3): 278–285. doi:10.1093/scan/nsp023. PMC 2728637. PMID 19633063.
- Zhang, D; Raichle ME (2010). "Disease and the brain's dark energy". Nature Reviews Neurology. 6 (1): 15–28. doi:10.1038/nrneurol.2009.198. PMID 20057496. S2CID 3337847.
- Sheline, YI; Raichle ME; Snyder AZ; Morris JC; Head D; Wang S. Mintun MA (2010). "Amyloid plaques disrupt resting state default mode network connectivity in cognitively normal elderly". J. Biological Psychiatry. 67 (6): 584–587. doi:10.1016/j.biopsych.2009.08.024. PMC 2829379. PMID 19833321.
- Raichle, ME (2009). "A paradigm shift in functional brain imaging". Journal of Neuroscience. 29 (41): 12729–12734. doi:10.1523/JNEUROSCI.4366-09.2009. PMC 6665302. PMID 19828783.
- White, BR; Snyder AZ; Cohen AL; Petersen SE; Raichle ME; Schlaggar BL; Culver JP (2009). "Resting-state functional connectivity in the human brain revealed with diffuse optical tomography". NeuroImage. 47 (1): 148–156. doi:10.1016/j.neuroimage.2009.03.058. PMC 2699418. PMID 19344773.
- He, BJ; Raichle ME (2009). "The fMRI signal, slow cortical potentials and consciousness". Trends in Cognitive Sciences. 13 (7): 302–309. doi:10.1016/j.tics.2009.04.004. PMC 2855786. PMID 19535283.
