= Metlife Foundation Award for Medical Research in Alzheimer's Disease =

Award for medical research

The Metlife Foundation Award for Medical Research in Alzheimer's Disease were awarded annually from 1986 to 2016 to recognize scientific contributions toward a better understanding of the underlying causes, prevention, and treatments of Alzheimer's disease. The awards were endowed by the Metlife Foundation and administered by the American Federation for Aging Research.

Each of the winners received a personal award of US$50,000 and US$200,000 in research funds to further their research.

== Recipients ==
2016	Guojun Bu
2016	Miia Kivipelto
2015	Randall J. Bateman
2015	Christian Haass
2014	Mathias Jucker
2014	Lary C. Walker
2014	Riqiang Yan
2013	Yueming Li
2013	Lennart Mucke
2012	Christine Van Broeckhoven
2012	Clifford R. Jack, Jr.
2010	Randy L. Buckner
2010	Marcus E. Raichle
2009	Todd E. Golde
2009	Edward Koo
2009	Eckhard Mandelkow
2009	Eva-Maria Mandelkow
2008	Takeshi Iwatsubo
2008	Michael S. Wolfe
2007	Bart De Strooper
2007	Robert Vassar
2007	Philip C. Wong
2006	David M. Holtzman
2006	Berislav V. Zlokovic
2005	Karen Hsiao Ashe
2004	William E. Klunk
2004	Chester A. Mathis
2004	John C. Morris
2004	Ronald C. Petersen
2003	Roberto Malinow
2003	Thomas C. Südhof
2002	Bruce A. Yankner
2001	Fred H. Gage
2001	Bradley T. Hyman
2000	Dennis W. Dickson
2000	Michael L. Hutton
1999	Mortimer Mishkin
1999	Larry R. Squire
1999	Douglas C. Wallace
1998	Paul Greengard
1997	Sangram S. Sisodia
1997	Steven G. Younkin
1996	Brenda Milner
1996	Michel Goedert
1996	Yasuo Ihara
1996	Virginia M.-Y. Lee
1996	John Q. Trojanowski
1995	Gerard D. Schellenberg
1995	Thomas D. Bird
1995	Ellen M. Wijsman
1995	Rudolph E. Tanzi
1994	John Hardy
1994	Alison Goate
1994	Robert W. Mahley
1994	Karl H. Weisgraber
1993	Blas Frangione
1993	Allen D. Roses
1992	No Award Given
1991	Stanley B. Prusiner
1990	Konrad Beyreuther
1990	Robert D. Terry
1989	Donald L. Price
1988	Carl W. Cotman
1988	George G. Glenner
1987	James F. Gusella
1987	Peter St. George-Hyslop
1986	Peter Davies
1986	Dennis J. Selkoe

== See also ==
- List of medicine awards
- List of neuroscience awards
