= Bruce Rosen =

American radiologist

Bruce Rosen is an American physicist and radiologist and a leading expert in the area of functional neuroimaging. His research for the past 30 years has focused on the development and application of physiological and functional nuclear magnetic resonance techniques, as well as new approaches to combine functional magnetic resonance imaging (fMRI) data with information from other modalities such as positron emission tomography (PET), magnetoencephalography (MEG) and noninvasive optical imaging. The techniques his group has developed to measure physiological and metabolic changes associated with brain activation and cerebrovascular insult are used by research centers and hospitals throughout the world.

As Director of the Athinoula A. Martinos Center for Biomedical Imaging at the Massachusetts General Hospital, he has overseen significant advances including the introduction and development of functional MRI in the early 1990s.

== Development of functional MRI ==
Rosen is the senior author on two seminal papers in the development of functional MRI. He was one of John (Jack) Belliveau's thesis advisers when Belliveau – a Harvard graduate student working in the NMR Center (now the Martinos Center) at Massachusetts General Hospital – performed his early experiments using MRI to reveal regional activity in the brain. Using an MR technique he had developed to track blood flow ("dynamic susceptibility contrast") he imaged the visual cortex of volunteers during periods of both rest and activation. By subtracting one image from the other, he then demonstrated differences in MR signal between the two.

Science recognized the significance of this work as the first demonstration of functional MRI in the human brain. It published Belliveau's report in November 1991 – with Rosen as the senior author – and featured one of his images on the cover.

The study opened the door to functional imaging the brain with MRI, but because the approach required the use of an intravenous contrast agent it was not suitable for wide application in humans. To address this limitation, Kenneth Kwong, a postdoctoral fellow in the NMR Center, developed a means to measure endogenous signals based on blood oxygenation using gradient echo imaging. He successfully demonstrated the technique in May 1991 and a report of the findings was published in 1992 in the Proceedings of the National Academy of Sciences of the United States of America.

== Research Activities ==
Rosen leads the activities of several large interdisciplinary and inter-institutional research programs, including the NIH Blueprint-funded Human Connectome Project; the NIH/National Institute of Biomedical Imaging and Bioengineering Biomedical Technology Resource Center, the Center for Functional Neuroimaging Technologies (CFNT); the Biomedical Informatics Research Network (BIRN) Collaborative Tools Support Network; and an NIH/National Center for Complementary and Integrative Health (NCCIH)-funded Center of Excellence for Research on Complementary and Alternative Medicine (e.g., he is, for instance, involved in animal and fMRI research investigating the neurophysiological responses to acupuncture stimulations). He is Principal Investigator/Program Director for two neuroimaging training programs. He has authored more than 300 peer-reviewed articles as well as over 50 book chapters, editorials and reviews.

== Education and career ==
Rosen graduated from Harvard University in 1977 with an A.B. in astronomy and astrophysics. In 1980, he received an M.S. in physics from Massachusetts Institute of Technology. He went on to earn an M.D. from Hahnemann Medical College (now Drexel University College of Medicine) in 1982 and a Ph.D. in medical physics from MIT in 1984 through the Harvard–MIT Program in Health Sciences and Technology.

He joined the faculty of Harvard Medical School in 1987, when he was also made director of clinical NMR in the Department of Radiology at the Massachusetts General Hospital. Today he is professor of radiology at Harvard Medical School and professor of health science and technology at the Harvard-MIT Division of Health Sciences and Technology, as well as director of the Athinoula A. Martinos Center for Biomedical Imaging at MGH. In 2013, he was named Laurence Lamson Robbins Professor of Radiology at Harvard Medical School.

== Awards and recognition ==
Rosen is the recipient of numerous awards in recognition of his contributions to the field of functional MRI, including the 2011 Outstanding Researcher award from the Radiological Society of North America (RSNA), and the Rigshospitalet's International KFJ Award 2011 from the University of Copenhagen/Rigshospitalet. He is a Fellow of the International Society for Magnetic Resonance in Medicine and an ISMRM Gold Medal winner for his contributions to the field of Functional MRI. In addition, he is a Fellow of the American Academy of Arts and Sciences, a Fellow of the American Institute for Medical and Biological Engineering, a member of the Institute of Medicine of the National Academies and a member of the National Academy of Medicine. In 2017 Rosen was elected a Fellow of the National Academy of Inventors.
