= Lisa Weissfeld =

American biostatistician

Lisa Anderson Weissfeld is an American biostatistician whose publications include work on the risks, prognoses, and treatment outcomes for pneumonia, sepsis, and end-of-life care; she is one of the authors of the pneumonia severity index. She has also published basic research on sparse data in meta-analysis, on multicollinearity, and on the dichotomization of ordinal data, and is one of the namesakes of the Wei–Lin–Weissfeld model in recurrent event analysis. She worked for many years as a professor at the University of Pittsburgh.

== Education and career ==
Weissfeld earned a Ph.D. in 1982 at the University of Pittsburgh, with the dissertation Bounds on the Efficiencies of Commonly Used Nonparametric Statistics supervised by Sam Wieand. She became a professor of biostatistics at the University of Pittsburgh in 1990.

In the mid-1990s, she became one of the founders and leaders of the Risk Analysis Section of the American Statistical Association, and one of its early chairs; she also served as secretary–treasurer for the Committee of Presidents of Statistical Societies. She left academia to become a statistical consultant in Washington, DC in 2014.

== Recognition ==
Weissfeld was elected as a Fellow of the American Statistical Association in 1999.

== Personal life ==
Weissfeld is married to Joel Weissfeld, an epidemiologist.
