= Jacob Hooker =

American chemist

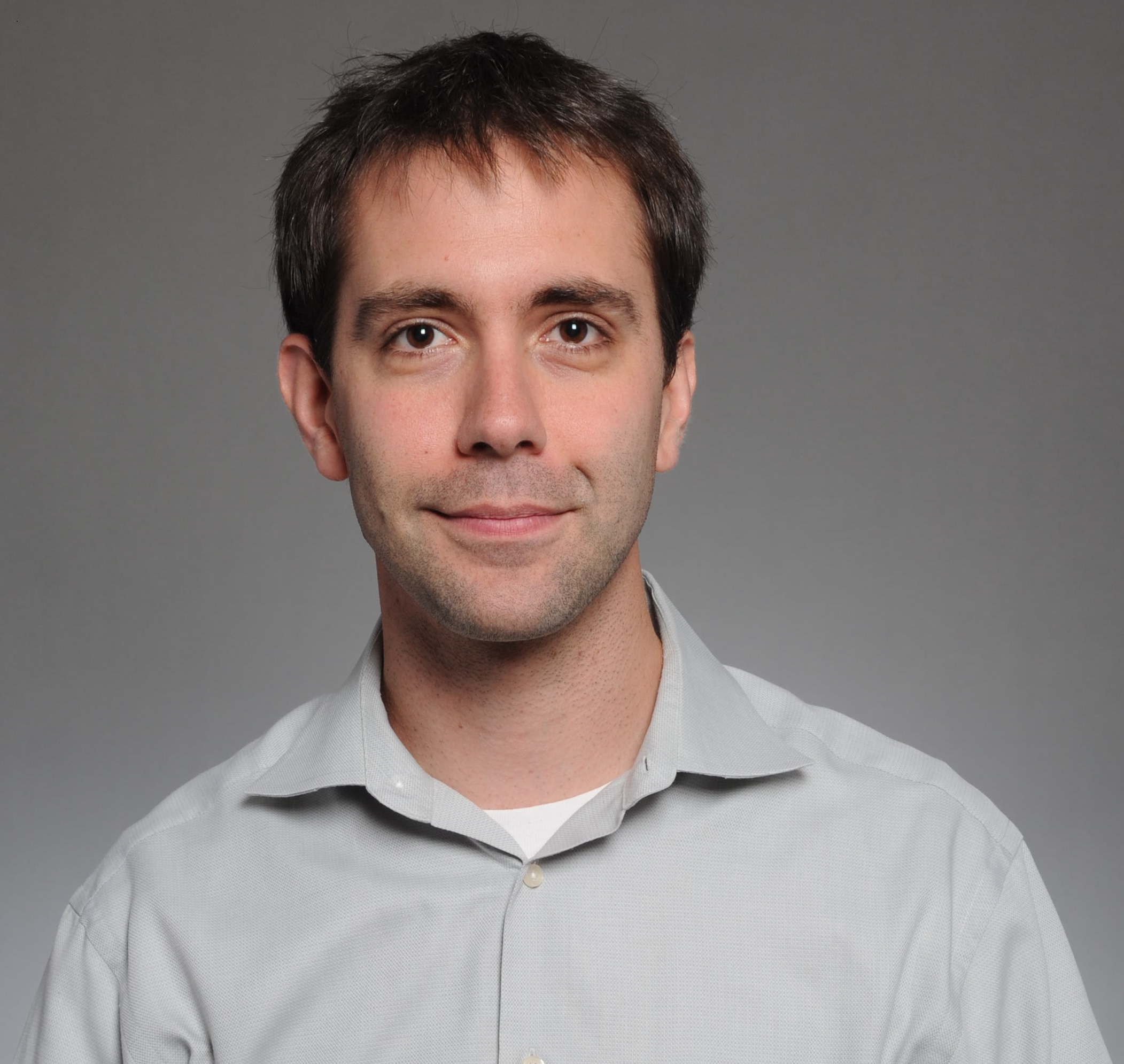
- Education: North Carolina State University (BS); University of California, Berkeley (PhD)
- Known for: Developed PET radiotracers for measuring biochemistry in the human brain
- Awards: Presidential Early Career Award for Scientists and Engineers (2010)
- Scientific career
- Fields: Chemistry, neuroscience and drug development
- Workplaces: Harvard Medical School; Massachusetts General Hospital
- Doctoral advisor: Matthew Francis (Doctoral Advisor); Joanna Fowler (Postdoctoral Advisor)

Jacob M. Hooker is an American chemist and expert in molecular imaging, specifically in the development and application of combined MRI and PET. He is the Lurie FamilyProfessor of Radiology specializing in Autism Research at Harvard Medical School. He also serves as a Phyllis and Jerome Lyle Rappaport MGH Research Scholar, director of radiochemistry at the Martinos Center for Biomedical Imaging and scientific director at the Lurie Center for Autism at Massachusetts General Hospital.

== Life and education ==
He grew up outside of Asheville, North Carolina and attended Enka High School. Hooker received a B.S. in Textile Chemistry and Chemistry from North Carolina State University in 2002 and later earned a Ph.D. in Chemistry from the University of California, Berkeley Hooker then completed postdoctoral training under the mentorship of Joanna Fowler at the Brookhaven National Laboratory, as a Goldhaber Distinguished Fellow, developing new neuroscience-oriented imaging methods and protocols.

== Career ==
Hooker relocated to Boston, Massachusetts in 2009 at the initiation of his independent research career at the Martinos Center. He co-designed and built a cyclotron and radiopharmacy facility housing a Siemens Eclipse HP Cyclotron, completed early 2011. At Massachusetts General Hospital, Hooker co-founded and co-directs an imaging facility that combines functional MRI and positron emission tomography (PET) for the neurochemical study of the Human Brain. He holds associate appointments at the Broad Institute and the Massachusetts Institute of Technology (MIT). From 2017 to 2021, Hooker co-founded Eikonizo Therapeutics and later Sensorium Therapeutics. He is also Editor-in-Chief of ACS Chemical Neuroscience.

Hooker has been a Scientific Advisor for Delix Therapeutics, Psy Therapeutics, Inc., and Fuzionaire Diagnostics. He is also chief science advisor to Rocket Science Health.

== Research ==
His research focus centers on the themes of neuroepigenetic, radiochemistry methods development and neuroimaging methods development, particularly leveraging positron emission tomography (PET). Hooker has published over 200 papers in the domains of:

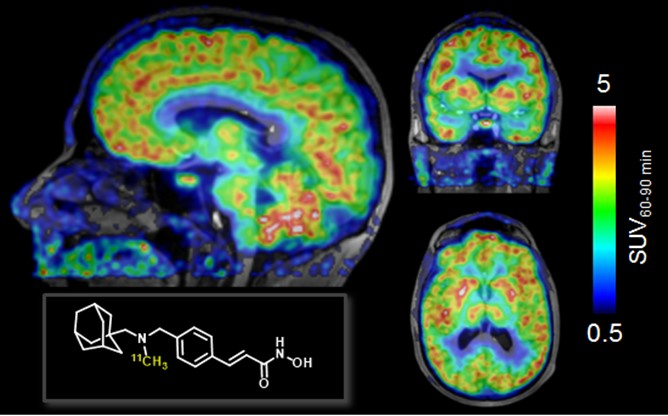
MR-PET: [11C]Martinostat uptake in living human brain.

=== PET Radiotracer Development ===
Hooker has developed PET radiotracers for measuring biochemistry in the human brain. For example, in 2016, Hooker's team created the first detailed images of how certain brain enzymes, known as Class-I histone deacetylases (HDACs), function in living humans. These enzymes play a key role in regulating genes and are linked to various brain disorders. By visualizing their activity, the research opened new doors to understanding how changes in these enzymes might contribute to conditions like schizophrenia, Alzheimer's disease, and autism, potentially leading to more targeted treatments.

=== Radiochemistry ===
Hooker has made contributions to the advancement of radiochemistry methods for PET imaging. For example, in 2011, Hooker collaborated with the Tobias Ritter lab to demonstrate the use of a palladium-IV complex in switching fluoride behavior in chemical reactions. This research was one of many other significant advances in radiochemistry and molecular imaging applications and decarboxylation with manganese catalysts.

=== Research on autism ===
As the scientific director of the Lurie Center for Autism at Massachusetts General Hospital, Hooker's work focuses on identifying specific subtypes of autism, which could pave the way for more precise diagnoses and treatments.

=== Neuroimaging methods ===
Hooker and his team were able to develop a method for brain glucose monitoring that produced something more like a movie, reporting changes in glucose use in response to multiple stimuli during a single PET scan. The lab is now expanding the concept of dynamic, functional PET imaging to measure real-time neurotransmitter release in the living human brain.

=== Other areas of exploration ===
At Harvard, Hooker's research lab, in collaboration with the Steve Haggarty lab, is exploring novel plant-based and entheogenic psychedelics, Their work includes projects such as investigating the potential of psychedelics in therapeutic applications.

== Recognition ==
In 2010, He received the Presidential Early Career Award for Scientists and Engineers. In 2016, Hooker was named as a Phyllis and Jerome Lyle Rappaport MGH Research Scholar which acknowledges 'forward thinking researchers with the funding they need to take their work into uncharted territories'. In 2015, He was featured in the inaugural Talented 12 list by Chemical & Engineering News, for his work in the area of molecular imaging, particularly focusing on positron emission tomography (PET).

In 2015, the Brain & Behavior Research Foundation acknowledged Hooker with an Independent Investigator Award for research piloting neuroimaging in patients with Schizophrenia. He was named by The Scientist magazine as a Scientist to Watch, and in an article dubbing him 'The Mind Mapper' was among inaugural winners of the Talented 12 Award from the American Chemical Society's C & E News.

Hooker was named by the National Academy of Sciences as a Kavli Fellow for a five-year tenure (2012-2017) and as a Keck Futures Initiative Fellow (2013-2015).
