= Harvard–MIT Program in Health Sciences and Technology =

American educational program

Coordinates: 42.36169°N 71.08694°W

Harvard-MIT Program in Health Sciences and Technology
- Established: 1970
- Affiliations: Harvard University; Massachusetts Institute of Technology
- Director: Collin M. Stultz and Wolfram Goessling
- Location: Cambridge, Massachusetts, United States
- Website: hst.mit.edu

The Harvard–MIT Program in Health Sciences and Technology (HST) is one of the oldest and largest biomedical engineering and physician-scientist training programs in the United States. It was founded in 1970 and is the longest-standing collaboration between Harvard University and the Massachusetts Institute of Technology (MIT). Within the program, graduate and medical students are registered with both MIT and Harvard and may work with faculty and affiliated faculty members from both communities. HST is a part of MIT's Institute for Medical Engineering and Science and forms the London Society at Harvard Medical School.

== Mission ==
HST's interdisciplinary educational program aims to bring engineering, physical sciences, and biological sciences from the laboratory bench to the patient's bedside. Conversely, it also aims to bring clinical insight from the patient's bedside to the laboratory bench. Consequently, HST students are trained to have a deep understanding of engineering and scientific fundamentals that complement with hands-on experience in the clinic or in industry. Program graduates become conversant with the underlying quantitative and molecular aspects of both medicine and biomedical sciences through the respective resources at Harvard Medical School and MIT.

== Educational programs ==
HST offers two doctoral degree programs. The Medical Sciences program leads to an MD degree awarded by Harvard and the Medical Engineering and Medical Physics (MEMP) program typically leads to a PhD degree awarded by MIT. Both programs require a strong quantitative orientation, hands-on clinical experience, and a focused interdisciplinary research project that culminates in a thesis. HST maintains a separate pre-clinical curriculum at Harvard Medical School for its 30 MD candidates. Several of these pre-clinical courses include students from both programs and take place at both Harvard and MIT campuses. Medical students reintegrate with the rest of the Harvard Medical School class for clinical courses. MEMP students take separate engineering courses at MIT and are also required to complete a 12-week immersive clinical experience at a Harvard teaching hospital. A few MEMP students each year are selected for neuroimaging or bioastronautics specializations that have specific training paths.

HST also offers a certificate program for MIT doctoral students called Graduate Education in Medical Sciences (GEMS). The GEMS certificate program offers students an abbreviated and structured experience through coursework and clinical exposure that is based on that required in the HST PhD program.

While HST had previously offered a terminal master's degree, this is now only awarded to students withdrawing from the PhD program.

== Notable faculty ==
- Robert S. Langer
- Mehmet Toner
- George Church
- Elazer R. Edelman
- Sangeeta Bhatia
- Bruce Rosen

== Notable alumni ==
- Rumi Chunara
- David Ho
- Mark McClellan
- Peter Diamandis
- Robert Satcher
- Atul Butte
- Roozbeh Ghaffari
- Bruce Rosen
- George Wodicka
