= Martin Buck =

British microbiologist

Martin Buck FRS is a British microbiologist. He is a professor at Imperial College, London. Studied at Royal Holloway, University of London
