= Henry Mahler =

American biochemist

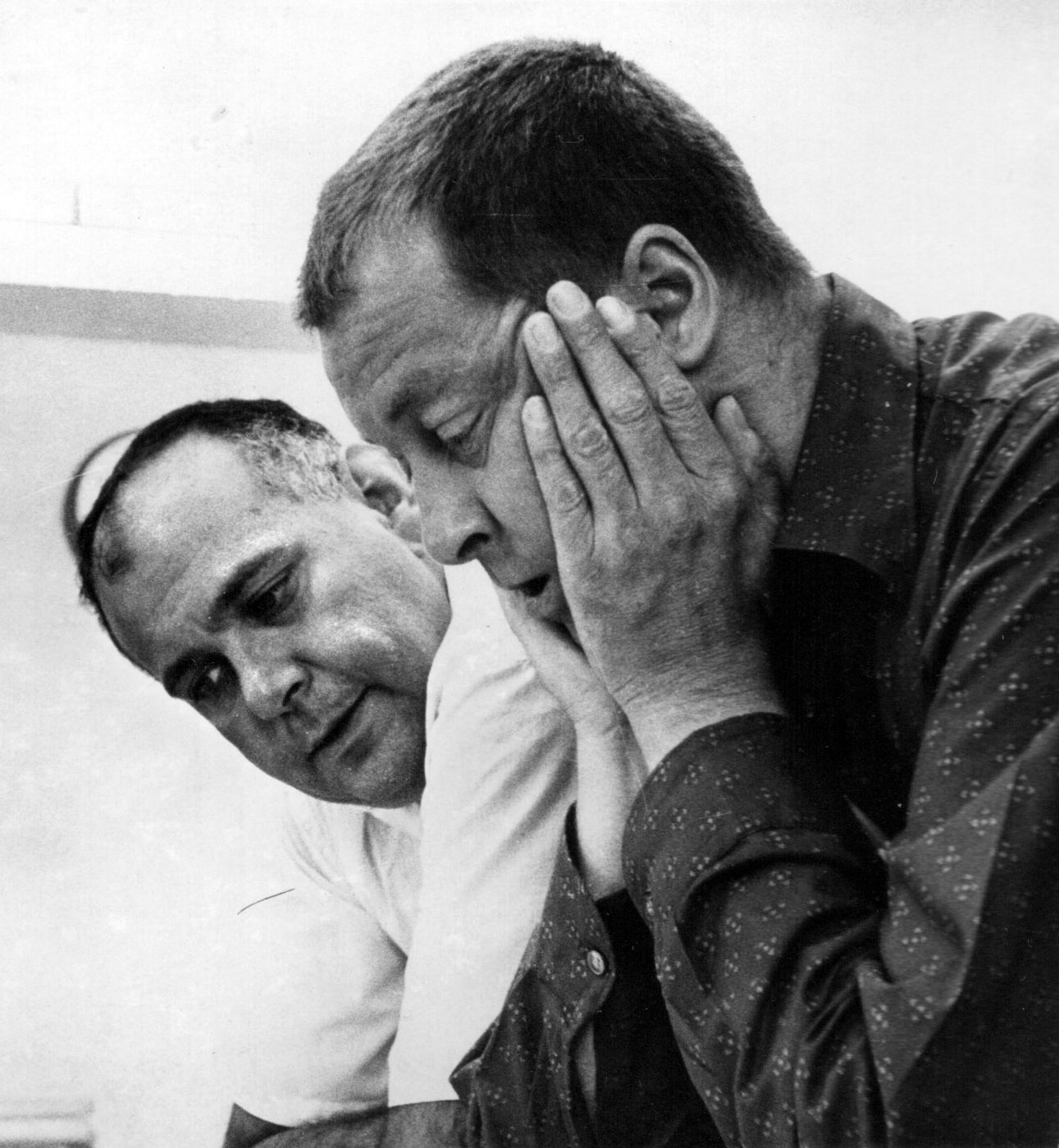
- Henry Mahler (left) with Dean Fraser at Indiana University ca. 1960.
- Born: 1921; Vienna, Austria
- Died: 1983 (aged 61–62); Woods Hole, Massachusetts
- Occupation: Biochemist.

Henry Ralph Mahler (1921–1983) was an Austrian-born American biochemist known for his research in the fields of both mitochondrial biogenesis and neurochemistry.

== Biography ==
Mahler was born in 1921 in Vienna, Austria. He emigrated to the United States in 1938, where he enrolled in Swarthmore College, from which he graduating in 1943. The same year, he enrolled at the University of California, Berkeley, where he received his Ph.D. in 1948. At Berkeley, he conducted research on aspects of mechanism of photosynthesis in plant chloroplasts under the direction of Nobel Prize winner Melvin Calvin. He then completed his postdoc at the Texas Research Foundation before joining the faculty of the University of Wisconsin, Madison's Institute for Enzyme Research in 1949 as a senior research associate. In 1951, he became an assistant professor there.

In 1955, he moved to Bloomington, Indiana to join the faculty of Indiana University as an associate professor. He was promoted to full professor at Indiana University in 1957, and was named research professor of biochemistry and neural sciences as well as National Institutes of Health Research Career Investigator there in 1966. In the 1976–77 academic year, he served as an honor fellow at University College London, a visiting professor at the C.N.R.S. Institute of Molecular Genetics, Gif-sur-Yvette, France, and visiting professor at the Institut fur Allgemeine Biochemie of the University of Vienna. During Professor Mahler's career, he published more than 300 research articles with his many former students, postdoctoral fellows and colleagues. He also coauthored two editions (1966 and 1971) of a well known textbook Biological Chemistry with his colleague Professor Eugene H. Cordes. In 1972, he collaborated with his Indiana University colleague Rudolf Raff on a paper criticizing the theory that mitochondria in the cells of higher organisms originated as independent, single-celled organisms. He died on July 6, 1983, of heart failure at Woods Hole, Massachusetts.
