= John Hardy (geneticist) =

British geneticist (born 1954)

- Born: John Anthony Hardy; 9 November 1954 (age 71)
- Education: University of Leeds (BSc); Imperial College London (PhD)
- Awards: Breakthrough Prize in Life Sciences (2016); FRS (2009); FMedSci (2008)
- Scientific career
- Workplaces: St Mary's Hospital, London; Mayo Clinic; National Institute on Aging; University of South Florida; University College London
- Thesis: The release of amino acids and phenylethylamine from mammalian synaptosomes (1981)
- Website: ucl.ac.uk/rlweston-inst/people/john

Sir John Anthony Hardy FRS (born 9 November 1954) is a human geneticist and molecular biologist at the Reta Lila Weston Institute of Neurological Studies at University College London with research interests in neurological diseases.

== Education ==
Hardy attended St Ambrose College in the late 1960s, where his interest in biochemistry was encouraged by his biology teacher, Mrs Cox. He received his Bachelor of Science degree from the University of Leeds in 1976 and his PhD from Imperial College London in 1981 for research on dopamine and amino acid neuropharmacology.

== Career and research ==
Following his PhD, Hardy did postdoctoral research at the MRC Neuropathogenesis Unit in Newcastle upon Tyne, England and then further postdoctoral work at the Swedish Brain Bank in Umeå, Sweden where he started to work on Alzheimer's disease.

Hardy became Assistant Professor of Biochemistry at St. Mary's Hospital, Imperial College London in 1985 and initiated genetic studies of Alzheimer's disease there. He became Associate Professor in 1989 and then took the Pfeiffer Endowed Chair of Alzheimer's Research at the University of South Florida, in Tampa in 1992. In 1996 he moved to Mayo Clinic in Jacksonville, Florida, as Consultant and Professor of Neuroscience.

Hardy became Chair of Neuroscience in 2000 and moved to National Institute on Aging, Bethesda, Maryland, as Chief of the Laboratory of Neurogenetics in 2001. In 2007 he took up the Chair of Molecular Biology of Neurological Disease at the Reta Lila Weston Institute of Neurological Studies, University College London.

On 29 November 2015, Hardy was awarded the Breakthrough Prize.

In 2018, Hardy, along with Christian Haass, Bart De Strooper and Michel Goedert, received the Brain Prize for "groundbreaking research on the genetic and molecular basis of Alzheimer's disease."

== Awards and honours ==
Among other awards and honours, Hardy has won the Breakthrough Prize in Life Sciences for dissecting the causes of Alzheimer's disease, Parkinson's disease and frontotemporal dementia; the MetLife prize for research into Alzheimer's disease, and the Potamkin Prize for his work in describing the first genetic mutations in the amyloid gene in Alzheimer's disease, in 1991. He was elected a Fellow of the Royal Society (FRS) in 2009. He was knighted in the 2022 New Year Honours for services to "human health in improving our understanding of dementia and neurodegenerative diseases".

- 2023 - Honorary Doctor of the University of Rijeka
- 2023 - Foreign Member of the Chinese Academy of Sciences
- 2022 New Year Honours
- 2022 - Mayo Clinic Distinguished Alumni Award
- 2018 – The Brain Prize
- 2017 – Honorary Doctor of Science, Leeds University
- 2015 – Breakthrough Prize in Life Sciences
- 2015 – Member of the European Molecular Biology Organization (EMBO)
- 2014 – The Michael J. Fox Foundation award for Parkinson research
- 2014 – Thudichum Medal from the Biochemical Society
- 2014 – Dan David Prize
- 2011 – Elected Fellow of the Institute of Biology
- 2010 – Honorary Doctor of Science, Newcastle University
- 2009 – Elected Fellow of the Royal Society
- 2008 – Honorary MD, Umeå University, Sweden,
- 2008 – Elected a Fellow of the Academy of Medical Sciences (FMedSci)
- 2008 – Anne Marie Oprecht International Prize for Research in Parkinson's Disease
- 2002 – Kaul Prize for Research into Alzheimer's disease
- 1995 – Allied Signal Prize for Research into Aging
- 1994 – Metlife Foundation Award for Medical Research in Alzheimer's Disease
- 1993 – Potamkin Prize from the American Academy of Neurology, for Alzheimer's Research
- 1992 – IPSEN Prize for Research into Alzheimer's Disease
- 1991 – Peter Debje Prize, University of Limburg, Belgium, For Alzheimer's Research
