= William E. Klunk =

American psychiatrist and neurologist

- Education: Shippensburg University B.S. Washington University in St. Louis M.D. Ph.D.
- Awards: Metlife Foundation Award for Medical Research in Alzheimer's Disease (2004); Potamkin Prize (2008); Reagan Institute Award (2009)
- Scientific career
- Institutions: University of Pittsburgh

William E. Klunk is an American psychiatrist and neurologist currently the Distinguished Professor of Psychiatry and Neurology and Levidow-Pittsburgh Foundation Chair in Alzheimer's Disease and Dementia Disorders at University of Pittsburgh.

He is one of the leading pioneers for in vivo amyloid imaging, which helps detect and quantify pathological protein aggregations in the brain of Alzheimer's patients.
