= Dennis J. Selkoe =

American physician (born 1943)

- Born: 25 September 1943 (age 83); New York City, United States
- Education: Columbia University (Bachelor, 1965); University of Virginia School of Medicine (M.D. 1969); Hospital of the University of Pennsylvania
- Known for: Selkoe Laboratory (founder); Molecular basis of Alzheimer's disease (Research)
- Spouse: Polly Selkoe
- Children: 2 including Greg Selkoe
- Awards: Dr A. H. Heineken Prize for Medicine (2002); Potamkin Prize (1989); Metlife Foundation Award for Medical Research in Alzheimer's Disease (1986)
- Scientific career
- Fields: Medicine, Neurology

Dennis J. Selkoe (born September 25, 1943) is an American neurologist and neuroscientist known for his research on the molecular mechanisms underlying Alzheimer's disease. He is the Vincent and Stella Coates Professor of Neurologic Diseases at Harvard Medical School and a senior neurologist at Brigham and Women's Hospital. Selkoe's research helped establish the role of amyloid-β peptides in Alzheimer's etiology and pathogenesis and contributed to the development of the amyloid cascade hypothesis, a dominant framework for understanding and treating the disease. He is a Fellow of the AAAS and a member of the National Academy of Medicine.

== Early life and education ==
Selkoe was born in New York City, United States. He earned a Bachelor of Arts degree from Columbia University in 1965 and received his Doctor of Medicine degree from the University of Virginia School of Medicine in 1969. He undertook postgraduate training in internal medicine at the Hospital of the University of Pennsylvania and in neurology at teaching hospitals of Harvard Medical School (Peter Bent Brigham, Children's, and Beth Israel Hospitals).

== Academic and clinical career ==
Selkoe joined the faculty of Harvard Medical School in 1975 as Instructor in Neurology, later becoming a professor of neurology and neuroscience. In 1985, he co-founded and became co-director of the Center for Neurologic Diseases at Brigham and women's Hospital, and in 1990 he received an endowed chair as the Vincent and Stella Coates Professor of Neurologic Diseases at Harvard Medical School. He has held clinical appointments at Brigham and Women's Hospital and Massachusetts General Hospital, where he has practiced neurology while directing a laboratory focused on neurodegenerative disease research, principally Alzheimer's and Parkinson's diseases.

He was the principal founding scientist of the biotechnology company Athena Neurosciences in 1986. Subsequently, he served on the boards of the biotech companies Athena, Elan, and Prothena. Selkoe also co-founded the Harvard Center for Neurodegeneration and Repair in 2001, reflecting his involvement in translational research initiatives aimed at developing therapies for neurologic diseases.

== Research ==
=== Alzheimer's disease mechanisms ===
Selkoe's laboratory identified amyloid-β (Aβ) peptides as pathogenic agents in AD and showed that these peptides are produced naturally throughout life from the amyloid precursor protein (APP) in essentially all cells. He and collaborators demonstrated that mutations in APP and later in the presenilin genes increase the production and accumulation of the toxic Aβ42 peptide and cause familial, early-onset Alzheimer's disease, establishing a genetic link between APP processing and neurodegeneration. In 1999, Selkoe's group identified presenilin as the catalytic component of the γ-secretase complex, the enzyme responsible for processing APP into Aβ throughout life, advancing understanding of pathogenic events in brain aging and AD.

=== Amyloid cascade hypothesis and synaptic toxicity ===
Selkoe contributed to the formulation and refinement of the amyloid cascade hypothesis, which proposes that accumulation and misprocessing of Aβ is an early driver of AD pathology, triggering downstream processes including tau pathology, synaptic dysfunction, and cognitive decline. His laboratory also provided evidence that soluble Aβ oligomers, rather than insoluble plaques alone, can impair synaptic function and memory, linking specific molecular abnormalities to cognitive deficits. He proposed that an imbalance in Aβ production and clearance, particularly increased levels of Aβ42, plays a central role in initiating AD pathology long before its clinical symptoms appear.

=== Broader neurodegenerative mechanisms ===
Selkoe's research extends to protein misfolding and aggregation in other neurodegenerative disorders, including Parkinson's disease, Huntington's disease, and amyotrophic lateral sclerosis, exploring partly shared pathways of cytotoxicity and abnormal protein clearance. His work examines the interplay between misfolded proteins, synaptic dysfunction, cellular stress responses, inflammation, and neuronal death, contributing to a systems-level understanding of neurodegeneration.

=== Therapeutic insights and translational impact ===
Selkoe has also published perspectives on how emerging Alzheimer's treatments could fundamentally alter the trajectory of human aging and dementia.

== Awards and honors ==
- Life Achievement Award from the Alzheimer's Association (2008)
- Member of the National Academy of Medicine (2005)
- Fellow of the American Association for the Advancement of Science (2003)
- Dr A. H. Heineken Prize for Medicine (2002)
- Rita Hayworth Award from the Alzheimer's Association (1995)
- Honorary doctorate from Harvard University (1991)
- Potamkin Prize (1989)
- Metlife Foundation Award for Medical Research in Alzheimer's Disease (1986)
- Wood Kalb Foundation Prize (1984)

== Selected publications ==
- Selkoe DJ, Ihara Y, Salazar FJ (1982). "Alzheimer's disease: insolubility of partially purified paired helical filaments in sodium dodecyl sulfate and urea". Science. 215 (4537): 1243–1245. Bibcode:1982Sci...215.1243S. doi:10.1126/science.6120571. PMID 6120571.
- Kosik KS, Joachim CL, Selkoe DJ (1986). "Microtubule-associated protein tau (tau) is a major antigenic component of paired helical filaments in Alzheimer disease". Proceedings of the National Academy of Sciences of the United States of America. 83 (11): 4044–4048. Bibcode:1986PNAS...83.4044K. doi:10.1073/pnas.83.11.4044. PMC 323662. PMID 2424016.
- Haass C, Schlossmacher MG, Hung AY, et al. (1992). "Amyloid beta-peptide is produced by cultured cells during normal metabolism". Nature. 359 (6393): 322–325. Bibcode:1992Natur.359..322H. doi:10.1038/359322a0. PMID 1383826.
- Citron M, Oltersdorf T, Haass C, et al. (1992). "Mutation of the beta-amyloid precursor protein in familial Alzheimer's disease causes increased beta-protein production". Nature. 360 (6405): 672–674. doi:10.1038/360672a0. PMID 1461358.
- Wolfe MS, Xia W, Ostaszewski BL, et al. (1999). "Two transmembrane aspartates in presenilin-1 required for presenilin endoproteolysis and gamma-secretase activity". Nature. 398 (6727): 513–517. Bibcode:1999Natur.398..513W. doi:10.1038/19077. PMID 10206644.
- Hardy J, Selkoe DJ (2002). "The amyloid hypothesis of Alzheimer's disease: progress and problems on the road to therapeutics". Science. 297 (5580): 353–356. Bibcode:2002Sci...297..353H. doi:10.1126/science.1072994. PMID 12130773.
- Walsh DM, Klyubin I, Fadeeva JV, et al. (2002). "Naturally secreted oligomers of amyloid beta protein potently inhibit hippocampal long-term potentiation in vivo". Nature. 416 (6880): 535–539. Bibcode:2002Natur.416..535W. doi:10.1038/416535a. PMID 11932745.
- Shankar GM, Li S, Mehta TH, et al. (2008). "Amyloid-beta protein dimers isolated directly from Alzheimer brains impair synaptic plasticity and memory". Nature Medicine. 14 (8): 837–842. Bibcode:2008NatMe..14..837S. doi:10.1038/nm1782. PMC 2702130. PMID 18568035.
- Bartels T, Choi JG, Selkoe DJ (2011). "alpha-Synuclein occurs physiologically as a helically folded tetramer that resists aggregation". Nature. 477 (7362): 107–110. Bibcode:2011Natur.477..107B. doi:10.1038/nature10324. PMC 3166366. PMID 21841801.
