= Robert Anthony Ainsworth =

British material scientist

Robert Anthony Ainsworth FRS FREng

Personal details
- Occupation: Materials scientist

Robert Anthony Ainsworth is a British material scientist, and Assessment Technology Group Head, at British Energy Generation. He is a visiting professor in the Department of Mechanical Engineering at Imperial College, London. In 2006, he won the James Clayton Prize, from IMechE.
