= Christian Haass =

German biochemist

- Born: 19 December 1960 (age 65); Mannheim
- Known for: Alzheimer's disease
- Awards: Ernst Jung Prize (2002); Potamkin Prize (2002); Gottfried Wilhelm Leibniz Prize (2002); Metlife Foundation Award for Medical Research in Alzheimer's Disease (2015); Brain Prize (2018)
- Scientific career
- Fields: biochemistry neuroscience
- Workplaces: LMU Munich

Christian Haass (born 19 December 1960 in Mannheim, Germany) is a German biochemist who specializes in metabolic biochemistry and neuroscience.

Haass studied biology at Heidelberg University from 1981 to 1985. From 1990 on, he was a postdoctoral fellow in the laboratory of Dennis Selkoe at Harvard Medical School, where he worked from 1993 to 1995 as an assistant professor. Afterwards, he returned to Germany as professor of molecular biology at the Central Institute of Mental Health, Mannheim. In 1999, he was offered a chair in the medical faculty at LMU Munich.

The emphasis of his work is in the molecular biology and cell biology of Alzheimer's disease and Parkinson's disease. He received Hamdan Award for Medical Research Excellence - Cytokines in Pathogenesis & Therapy of Diseases from Hamdan Medical Award in 2006. Among other awards, he has won the Leibniz Prize and the Metlife Foundation Award for Medical Research in Alzheimer's Disease.

== Sources ==
- Adolf Butenandt Institute - LMU Munich
- Laboratory for Neurodegenerative Disease Research
- Collaborative Research Center 596 - Molecular Mechanisms of Neurodegeneration
- Publications
