= Feldberg Foundation =

German-British experimental medical foundation

The Feldberg Foundation promotes scientific exchange between German and British scientists in the field of experimental medical research. The foundation is registered in Hamburg, Germany with the secretariat based in the UK.

The pharmacologist Wilhelm Feldberg, who as a Jew had been forced to emigrate from Germany in 1933, used the pension he was given as Emeritus Professor in Germany and the restitution money that he received from the German Government to establish the Feldberg Foundation in 1961.

Each year a German and a British scientist are chosen, and each recipient gives a prize lecture in the other one's country.

== Recipients ==
=== 2021–2024 ===
Year	British	German
2024	Sarah Teichmann, Wellcome Trust Sanger Institute	Martin Beck, Max-Planck-Institut für Biophysik
2023	Doreen Cantrell, University of Dundee	Jan Dorn, Universität Tübingen
2022	Vassilis Pachnis, Francis Crick Institute	Anne Ephrussi, European Molecular Biology Laboratory
2021	Maria Fitzgerald, University College London	Ralf Adams, Max-Planck-Institut für molekulare Biomedizin

=== 2011–2020 ===
Year	British	German
2020	Michael Häusser, Wolfson Institute for Biomedical Research	Volker Haucke, Leibniz-Forschungsinstitut für Molekulare Pharmakologie Berlin
2019	Anne Ferguson-Smith, University of Cambridge	Jörg Vogel, Helmholtz Institute for RNA-based Infection Research und Institute of Molecular Infection Biology, Würzburg
2018	Ramanujan S. Hegde, Medical Research Council	Rohini Kuner, University of Heidelberg
2017	Irene Tracey, University of Oxford	Asifa Akhtar, Max Planck Institute of Immunobiology and Epigenetics
2016	Patrick Rorsman, University of Oxford	Thomas Langer, University of Cologne
2015	Russell G. Foster, University of Oxford	Roger S. Goody, Max Planck Institute for Molecular Physiology
2014	Gitta Stockinger, National Institute for Medical Research London	Nikolaus Pfanner, Albert-Ludwigs-Universität Freiburg
2013	Graham Collingridge, University of Bristol	Martin Biel, LMU Munich
2012	Steve Gamblin, National Institute for Medical Research London	Iain Mattaj, European Molecular Biology Laboratory, Hamburg
2011	Eleanor Maguire, University College London	Patrick Cramer, LMU Munich

=== 2001–2010 ===
Year	British	German
2010	Frances Ashcroft, University of Oxford	Roland Lill, University of Marburg
2009	Peter Somogyi, University of Oxford	Veit Flockerzi, Saarland University
2008	Robin Lovell-Badge, National Institute for Medical Research, London	Stefan Offermanns, Heidelberg University
2007	Stephen O'Rahilly, University of Cambridge	Ed C. Hurt, Heidelberg University
2006	Richard G. Morris, University of Edinburgh	Felix Wieland, Heidelberg University
2005	Geoffrey L. Smith, Imperial College London	Klaus Aktories, University of Freiburg in Breisgau
2004	David Lodge, Lilly Research Centre, Surrey	Franz-Ulrich Hartl, Max Planck Institute of Biochemistry, Munich
2003	Ian M. Kerr, Cancer Research UK	Franz Hofmann, Technical University of Munich
2002	Stephen Franks, Imperial College London	Reinhard Lührmann, Max Planck Institute for Biophysical Chemistry, Göttingen
2001	John O'Keefe, University College London	Wolfgang Baumeister, Max Planck Institute of Biochemistry, Munich

=== 1991–2000 ===
Year	British	German
2000	J. C. Smith, National Institute for Medical Research London	Thomas Jentsch, Center for Molecular Neurobiology Hamburg
1999	Kay Elizabeth Davies, University of Oxford	Günter Schultz, Free University of Berlin
1998	Ron Laskey, University of Cambridge	Michael Frotscher, University of Freiburg in Breisgau
1997	Richard S. J. Frackowiak, University College London	Arthur Konnerth, Saarland University
1996	Alan R. Fersht, University of Cambridge	Walter Neupert, LMU Munich
1995	D. J. P. Barker, MRC Environmental Epidemiology Unit Southampton	Werner Franke, German Cancer Research Center, Heidelberg
1994	T. Bliss, National Institute for Medical Research London	Thomas C. Südhof, Max Planck Institute for Biophysical Chemistry, Göttingen
1993	Alan Hall, Institute of Cancer Research London	Peter H. Seeburg, Max Planck Institute for Medical Research, Heidelberg
1992	David A. Brown, University College London	Peter Gruss, Max Planck Institute for Biophysical Chemistry, Göttingen
1991	Paul Nurse, University of Oxford	Klaus Starke, University of Freiburg in Breisgau

=== 1981–1990 ===
Jahr	British	German
1990	D.R. Trentham, National Institute for Medical Research London	Herbert Jäckle, LMU Munich
1989	M. C. Raff, National Institute for Medical Research	Konrad Beyreuther, Center for Molecular Biology of Heidelberg
1988	T. L. Blundell, Birkbeck College London	Heinrich Betz, Max Planck Institute for Brain Research, Frankfurt
1987	W. F. H. Jarrett, University of Glasgow	Hans-Dieter Klenk, University of Marburg
1986	J. J. Skehel, National Institute for Medical Research	Peter Starlinger, University of Cologne
1985	Michael Berridge, Cambridge	Heinz Schaller, Max Planck Institute for Medical Research, Heidelberg
1984	David Weatherall, Medical Research Council	Erich Muscholl, University of Mainz
1983	Sydney Brenner, Medical Research Council	Jürgen Aschoff, Max Planck Institute for Behavioral Physiology
1982	George Radda, Oxford	Dieter Oesterhelt, Max Planck Institute of Biochemistry near Munich
1981	John Hughes, Imperial College London und Hans Walter Kosterlitz, Aberdeen	Bernd Lindemann, Saarland University

=== 1971–1980 ===
Year	British	German
1980	John Robert Vane, Wellcome Research Laboratories, Beckenham	Hans Thoenen, Max Planck Institute of Psychiatry, München
1979	J. L. Gowans, Medical Research Council	Erwin Neher und Bert Sakmann
1978	Leslie L. Iversen, Medical Research Council	Wilhelm Stoffel, University of Cologne
1977	Helen Muir, Kennedy Institute of Rheumatology, Oxford	Ernst Habermann, University of Giessen
1976	Peter D. Mitchell, Glynn Laboratory, UCL	Eberhard Frömter, Max Planck Institute of Biophysics, Frankfurt
1975	J. B. Gurdon, Medical Research Council	Heinz-Günter Wittmann, Max Planck Institute for Molecular Genetics
1974	G. R. Brindley, Medical Research Council	Peter Karlson, University of Marburg
1973	Brigitte Askonas, National Institute for Medical Research	Otto Wieland, Klinikum Schwabing
1972	Henry Harris, University of Oxford	Herbert Remmer, University of Tübingen
1971	–	Norbert Hilschmann, Max Planck Institute for Experimental Medicine

=== 1961–1970 ===
Year	British	German
1970	Thaddeus Mann, University of Cambridge	Horst Tobias Witt, Technische Universität Berlin
1969	Marthe Louise Vogt, Babraham Institute	Eugen Werle, LMU Munich
1968	David C. Phillips, University of Oxford	Alfred Gierer, Max Planck Institute for Virus Research
1967	William Albert Hugh Rushton, University of Cambridge	Robert Stämpfli, Saarland University
1966	Roderic Alfred Gregory, University of Liverpool	Hansjochem Autrum, LMU Munich
1965	Bernard Katz, University College London	Gerhard Braunitzer, Max Planck Institute of Biochemistry near Munich
1964	G. W. Harris, University of Oxford	Gerhard Thews, University of Mainz
1963	Hugh E. Huxley, Laboratory of Molecular Biology Cambridge	Wilhelm Hasselbach, Max Planck Institute for Medical Research Heidelberg
1962	David Whitteridge, University of Oxford	Karl Julius Ullrich, Free University of Berlin
1961	Lindor Brown, University of Oxford	–
