= Chica and Heinz Schaller Foundation =

German charitable foundation

The Chica and Heinz Schaller Foundation is a charitable foundation in Heidelberg, Germany. Established by the scientists Chica Schaller and Heinz Schaller (co-founder of Biogen), its main objective is to support young scientists within the Heidelberg Science Community

== The Annual Chica and Heinz Schaller Research Award ==
With its 100,000€↑ prize money this yearly award is one of the highest awards for junior scientists in Germany. If more than one awardee is selected, each laureate receives the full sum.

Laureates
Year	Laureate	Affiliation at the time of Award
2017	Theodore Alexandrov	EMBL
2017	Marike Essers	DKFZ
2016	Matthias Fischer	MPIMF
2015	Edward Lemke	EMBL
2015	Haikun Liu	DKFZ
2014	Jan Korbel	EMBL
2014	Brian Luke	ZMBH (Zentrum für Molekulare Biologie Heidelberg)
2012	John Briggs	EMBL
2011	Anton Meinhart	MPIMF
2011	Michael Platten	Heidelberg University and DKFZ
2010	Andreas Fischer	Heidelberg University and DKFZ
2009	Gerhard Schratt	Heidelberg University
2008	Tobias Dick	DKFZ
2007	Victor Sourjik	ZMBH
2006	Matthias Kneussel	ZMNH
2006	Kai Matuschewski	Heidelberg University
2005	Rohini Kuner	Heidelberg University

== Chica and Heinz Schaller Research Groups ==
Since 2012 the Foundation funds Schaller Junior Research groups at the University of Heidelberg and DKFZ. Initially five groups were funded for a period of five years with the possibility of a two-year extension.

- Cellular Polarity and Viral Infection - Steeve Boulant
- Neuropeptides - Valery Grinevich
- Proteostasis in Neurodegenerative Disease - Dr. Thomas Jahn
- Norovirus Research - Grant Hansman
- Mechanisms of Tumor Cell invasion - Björn Thews

In Fall 2017 four new group leaders were selected by the interdisciplinary committee.

== Chica and Heinz Schaller Endowed Chair ==
Between 2002 and 2012 the Foundation Ralf Bartenschlager held the chair for Molecular Virology before being appointed full professor at the University of Heidelberg
