= Katrin Rittinger =

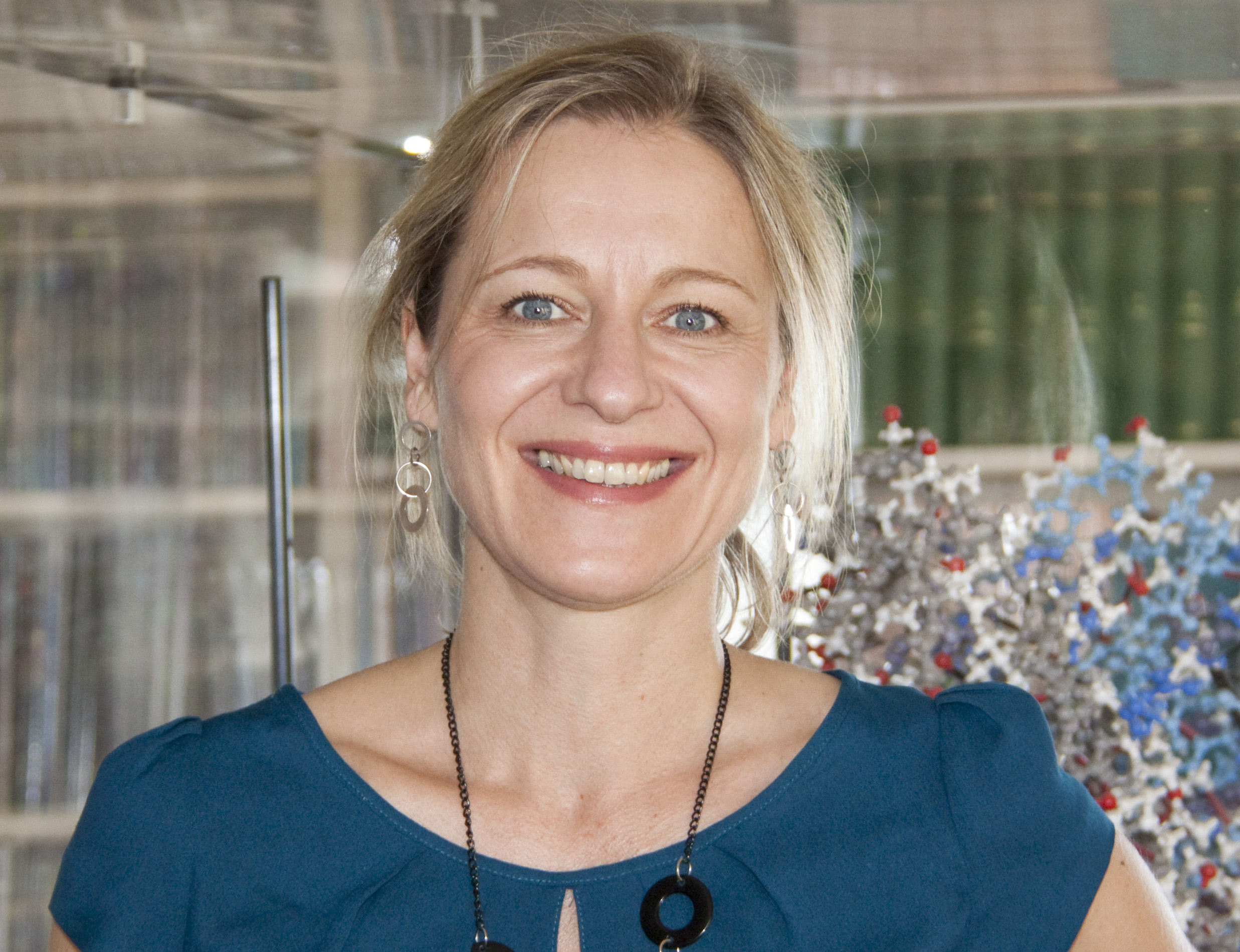
- Known for: Study of Ubiquitination
- Awards: EMBO member
- Scientific career
- Fields: Structural Biology
- Thesis: Einsatz von intrinsischer and extrinsischer Fluoreszenz zur Untersuchung von Struktur-Funktionsbeziehungen an der HIV Reversen Transkriptase

Katrin Rittinger is a professor in structural biology who has made significant contributions to the ubiquitination field. She is a senior scientist at the Francis Crick Institute and was awarded European Molecular Biology Organization (EMBO) membership in 2019. Rittinger is on the Editorial Board of Biochemical Journal and has written on transparency and openness in science.

== Education and academic career ==
Katrin Rittinger studied for a degree in chemistry at the Ruprecht Karls University, Heidelberg. Her Ph.D. research was at the Max-Planck Institute for Medical Research in Heidelberg with Roger Goody. In 1995 Rittinger moved to become a Postdoctoral Fellow at Max-PIanck Institute for Molecular Physiology, Dortmund. In 1996, Rittinger moved to London to the MRC National Institute for Medical Research working with Guy Dodson and Alastair Aitken. In 2000 Rittinger set up her independent group at the MRC National Institute for Medical Research (now part of the Francis Crick Institute).

== Research interests ==
During her Ph.D, Rittinger studied human immunodeficiency virus reverse transcriptase. At MRC National Institute for Medical Research Rittinger studied the structural basis of the interaction between 14-3-3 proteins and phosphorylated target proteins. At the same time she researched members of the Rho-family of GTPases and clarified the mechanism of action of GTPase-activating proteins (GAPs). Latterly, Rittinger has studied the ubiquitination-dependent regulation of immune signalling processes. She has also collaborated with GlaxoSmithKline to discover inhibitors targeting the active site cysteine of thioester-forming E3 ubiquitin ligases.

Rittinger has undertaken activities to promote women in science.

== Professional associations and awards ==
- Katrin Rittinger is an associate editor of Biochemical Journal
- In 2015 Rittinger was nominated to AcademiaNet by the MRC
- In 2019 Rittinger was awarded EMBO membership
