= Stockinger (surname) =

Stockinger is a surname. Notable people with the surname include:

- Brigitta Stockinger, British scientist
- Francisco Stockinger (1919–2009), Austrian artist
- Hannes Stockinger (born 1955), Austrian scientist
- Marlon Stöckinger (born 1991), Filipino racing driver
- Martin Stockinger, Austrian cross-country skier
