= Thomas J. Jentsch =

- Born: Germany
- Education: Dr. rer. nat., Dr. med.
- Alma mater: Freie Universität Berlin
- Known for: Discovery and characterization of CLC chloride channels/Cl⁻/H⁺ exchangers; volume-regulated anion channels (VRAC/LRRC8); acid-activated anion channel (ASOR/TMEM206); KCNQ (Kv7) potassium channels
- Awards: Gottfried Wilhelm Leibniz Prize, Louis-Jeantet Prize.
- Scientific career
- Fields: Ion channel biology, chloride channels (CLC, VRAC)
- Workplaces: Leibniz-Forschungsinstitut für Molekulare Pharmakologie (FMP), Max-Delbrück-Center for Molecular Medicine
- Website: https://leibniz-fmp.de/jentsch

Thomas J. Jentsch (born April 24, 1953) is a German molecular physiologist and expert in ion‑transport biology whose work has helped shape the understanding of chloride channel families and their role in human physiology and disease. He leads the Section for Physiology and Pathology of Ion Transport at the Leibniz-Forschungsinstitut für Molekulare Pharmakologie (FMP) in Berlin and has also been affiliated (until 2023) with the Max Delbrück Center for Molecular Medicine. His research includes the cloning, structural and functional characterisation of the CLC (chloride channel/Cl⁻/H⁺‑exchanger) gene family, the discovery of their roles in human disorders (such as myotonia, osteopetrosis, kidney disease), and the more recent identification of volume‑regulated anion channels (VRAC) and acid‑activated anion channels (ASOR). His lab has also identified the four neuronal members of the KCNQ (Kv7) family of potassium channels and discovered their role in epilepsy and deafness, and studied the roles of all KCC potassium-chloride cotransporters using genetic mouse models.

== Early life and education ==
Thomas J. Jentsch studied both medicine and physics at the Freie Universität Berlin. He obtained doctoral degrees in both the Dr. rer. nat. (physics) and the Dr. med. (medicine) at the same institution. Following his doctoral work, Jentsch carried out post‑doctoral research in transport physiology in Berlin and at the Whitehead Institute/ MIT in the United States, working with Harvey Lodish.

== Research and career ==
In 1988 Jentsch was a founding member of the Center for Molecular Neurobiology Hamburg (ZMNH). In 2006 he moved his laboratory to Berlin, joining the Leibniz-Forschungsinstitut für Molekulare Pharmakologie (FMP) and the Max Delbrück Center for Molecular Medicine in the Helmholtz Association (MDC). His laboratory's research spans from molecular and structural biology of ion channels to their integration in cell biology, physiology and disease. Jentsch's group made seminal contributions to the identification and functional analysis of the CLC family of chloride channels and Cl⁻/H⁺ exchangers in mammals. They also more recently found that the volume‑regulated anion channel (VRAC) is composed of LRRC8 heteromers and molecularly identified the acid‑activated anion channel (ASOR/TMEM206), another key Cl⁻ channel with physiological relevance.

== Major discoveries and contributions ==
One of Jentsch's main achievements is the cloning and characterisation of the CLC gene family, which comprises nine members in humans and reveals a dramatic diversity of function, from plasma‑membrane chloride channels regulating membrane excitability to intracellular Cl⁻/H⁺ exchangers modulating endolysosomal acidification. His 2015 review “Discovery of CLC transport proteins: cloning, structure, function and pathophysiology” outlines the path from ClC‑0 to a broad understanding of ion transport and disease. His work demonstrated that mutations in CLC genes underlie a range of human genetic diseases - for example, myotonia congenita (CLCN1), Bartter syndrome (ClC‑K/barttin), osteopetrosis (ClC‑7/Ostm1) - thereby linking basic channel biology to translational and clinical relevance. Through his structural‑functional studies, Jentsch helped reveal how channel architecture controls transport properties, and how intracellular chloride transporters contribute to vesicular and lysosomal function, neuronal health, bone resorption, and kidney physiology.

== Awards and Honours ==
Thomas J. Jentsch has received numerous awards over his career, reflecting contributions to ion-channel biology. In 1995, he was awarded the Gottfried Wilhelm Leibniz Prize by the German Research Foundation (DFG) for his work on chloride channels. He has been awarded European Research Council (ERC) Advanced Grants, first in 2011 and again in 2017. In recognition of his scientific achievements, he was granted an Honorary Doctorate (Dr. h.c.) by the University Medical Center Hamburg-Eppendorf in 2017. He has also received the International Prize for Translational Neuroscience (1999), the Hansen Family Award (2000), Feldberg Foundation Prize (2000), the Hodgkin-Huxley-Katz Prize Lecture (2006), Adolf-Fick Prize (2004), Homer W. Smith Award for Nephrology (2004), and the Ernst Jung Prize for medicine (2001). In 2018, he was awarded the “Gesellschaft braucht Wissenschaft” (“Society needs Science”) Prize by the Stifterverband, and in 2024 he became an Honorary Member of the German Physiological Society. In 2000, Jentsch was awarded the Louis-Jeantet Prize for Medicine by the Fondation Louis-Jeantet. He is a member of the European Molecular Biology Organization, the Academia Europaea, the Deutsche Akademie der Naturforscher Leopoldina, the Academy of Sciences and Humanities in Hamburg and the Berlin-Brandenburg Academy of Sciences and Humanities.

== Selected publications ==
- Jentsch, T. J. Discovery of CLC transport proteins: cloning, structure, function and pathophysiology. Journal of Physiology 593, no. 18 (2015): 4091–4109. DOI: 10.1113/JP270043.
- Jentsch, T.J., Steinmeyer, K., Schwarz, G. , Primary structure of Torpedo marmorata chloride channel isolated by expression cloning in Xenopus oocytes Nature 348 (1990): 510-514.
- Jentsch, T. J. et al. The CLC chloride channel family. Pflügers Archiv – European Journal of Physiology 437, Suppl 1 (1999): F172–F175.
- Jentsch, T. J., Pusch, M. CLC chloride channels and transporters: structure, function, physiology and disease. Physiological Reviews 98, (2018): 1493-1590.
- Voss, F. K.; Ullrich, F.; Münch, J.; .... Jentsch, T.J. . Identification of LRRC8 heteromers as an essential component of the volume-regulated anion channel VRAC. Science 344, no. 6184 (2014): 634–638.
- Ullrich, F., Blin, S, ... Jentsch, T.J. Identification of TMEM206 proteins as pore of PAORAC/ASOR acid-sensitive chloride channels. eLife (2019) e49187
- Jentsch, T.J. Neuronal KCNQ potassium channels: physiology and role in disease. Nature Rev Neuroscience 1 (2000): 21-30.
