= Daniel Haber =

Daniel Haber may refer to:

- Daniel A. Haber, professor of oncology
- Daniel Haber (soccer) (born 1992), Canadian soccer player
