= Stefan Raunser =

German structural biochemist

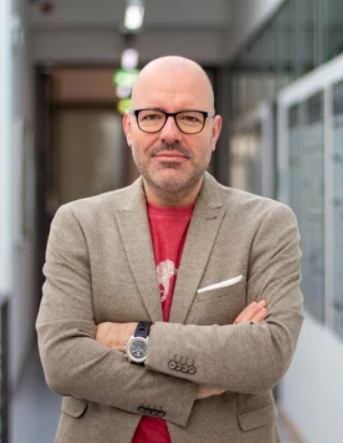
- Born: 1976 (age 49–50); Germany, Landau-Palatinate
- Education: Max Planck Institute of Biophysics, Goethe University Frankfurt
- Known for: CryoEM, CryoET, Membrane protein, Toxin, Cytoskeleton, Sarcomere
- Awards: German Academy of Sciences Leopoldina; EMBO Member; Einstein Foundation Berlin Professorship; Jugend forscht
- Scientific career
- Fields: Biochemistry
- Workplaces: Max Planck Institute of Molecular Physiology, Harvard Medical School, Freie Universität Berlin, TU Dortmund University, University of Duisburg-Essen
- Doctoral advisor: Prof. Dr. Werner Kühlbrandt
- Other academic advisors: Prof. Dr. Roger S. Goody, Prof. Dr. Thomas Walz
- Website: https://www.mpi-dortmund.mpg.de/research/departments/structural-biochemistry

Stefan Raunser (born 1976 in Landau in der Pfalz, Germany) is a German scientist and structural biologist specializing in membrane proteins, the cytoskeleton, toxins, and sarcomere structural biochemistry. Since 2014, he has been a director at the Max Planck Institute of Molecular Physiology in Dortmund, Germany.

== Education and career ==
Raunser studied biology and chemistry at the Johannes Gutenberg-Universität Mainz and completed his Ph.D. in biochemistry at the Goethe University Frankfurt in 2004, under the supervision of Prof. Werner Kühlbrandt at the Max Planck Institute of Biophysics in Frankfurt/Main.

He continued his research as a postdoctoral researcher at Harvard Medical School in Boston, USA, working with Thomas Walz from 2005 to 2008. He then became an "Emmy Noether group leader" at the Max Planck Institute of Molecular Physiology in Dortmund, serving in that position from 2008 to 2013. In 2014, Raunser held the Einstein Professorship for Membrane Biochemistry at Free University of Berlin from January to June before assuming his current role as a director at the Max Planck Institute of Molecular Physiology. In 2015, he became an honorary professor at the University of Duisburg-Essen, and later that same year, he became an adjunct professor at Technical University of Dortmund.

== Research and selected publications ==
The Raunser lab specializes in structural biochemistry, they employ and develop methods in CryoEM and CryoET to conduct research and uncover the molecular mechanisms in different aspects of cell biology.

=== Tc toxin complexes ===
In the field of Tc toxins, tripartite ABC-type toxins from Photorhabdus luminescens and other bacteria that are used by the bacteria as virulence factors, his research has focused on molecular mechanisms involved in toxin activation, toxin release, receptor binding, membrane permeation, protein translocation, and intoxication. His group published a movie of the intoxication process. His work on Tc toxins has revealed their potential as customisable molecular syringes for delivering proteins across membranes, opening up possibilities for biotechnological and biomedical applications.

=== Software and hardware development in cryoEM/cryoET ===
The Raunser lab has contributed to developments in cryoEM image processing and cryoET hardware development. They developed SPHIRE (together with Pawel Penczek), which evolved later into TranSPHIRE. The program offers an easy-to-use and versatile image processing suite for the single particle analysis of protein complexes in CryoEM. The group has also developed other software tools, such as SPHIRE-crYOLO and TomoTwin, for automatic particle picking in cryoEM and cryoET. On the CryoET front, the group has developed a streamlined workflow for automated cryo-focused ion beam milling for the analysis of vitrified samples by electron cryo tomography.

=== Structural biochemistry of the cytoskeleton and muscle contraction ===
==== Single particle approach ====
Raunser's group has increased the resolution limits of single particle cryoEM reconstructions of muscle and cytoskeletal proteins, including actin filaments (F-actin), actin filaments in complex with actin-binding proteins, toxins and ligands, the actin-tropomyosin complex, and the actomyosin complex. The lab has determined the cryoEM structures of F-actin at ~2.2 Å resolution, allowing for the first time the direct visualisation of water molecules in the structure and giving atomic insight into ATP hydrolysis in F-actin and phosphate release from the filament after hydrolysis.

==== Tomography approach ====
Raunser's group has revealed the three-dimensional organization of the sarcomere in situ, resolving the molecular organization of myosin, alpha-actinin-1, and additional sarcomeric components. The group also determined the first structure of native nebulin bound to actin thin filaments within intact sarcomeres at 4.5 Å resolution, and has successfully obtained the world's first high-resolution 3D image of the myosin thick filament in its natural cellular environment.

=== Structural biochemistry of membrane proteins ===
Raunser's group has made significant contributions to understanding the structures of key proteins involved in cell signaling, such as the rabbit ryanodine receptor 1 and the TRPC4 channel, as well as the Drosophila's Slowpoke (Slo) potassium channel. This research has provided insights into the regulatory mechanisms and revealed potential target sites for drug development.

== Fellowships and awards (selection) ==
- Member of the North Rhine-Westphalian Academy of Sciences and Arts (2022)
- German National Academy of Sciences Leopoldina Member (2019)
- EMBO Member (2018)
- Einstein Professorship of the Einstein Foundation Berlin (2013)
- Member of the "Junges Kolleg" (Academy of Sciences and Arts of Northrhine-Westfalia) (2011–2014)
- Emmy-Noether Fellowship German Research Foundation (DFG) (2008–2013)
- Fellow of the German National Academy of Sciences Leopoldina (2007–2008)
