= Hanganu =

Hanganu is a Romanian surname. Notable people with the surname include:

- Dan Hanganu (1939–2017), Romanian-born Canadian architect
- Ileana Hanganu-Opatz (born 1975), Romanian academic neurophysiologist
- Ovidiu Cornel Hanganu (born 1970), Romanian footballer
