= Rudolph E. Tanzi =

American geneticist (born 1958)

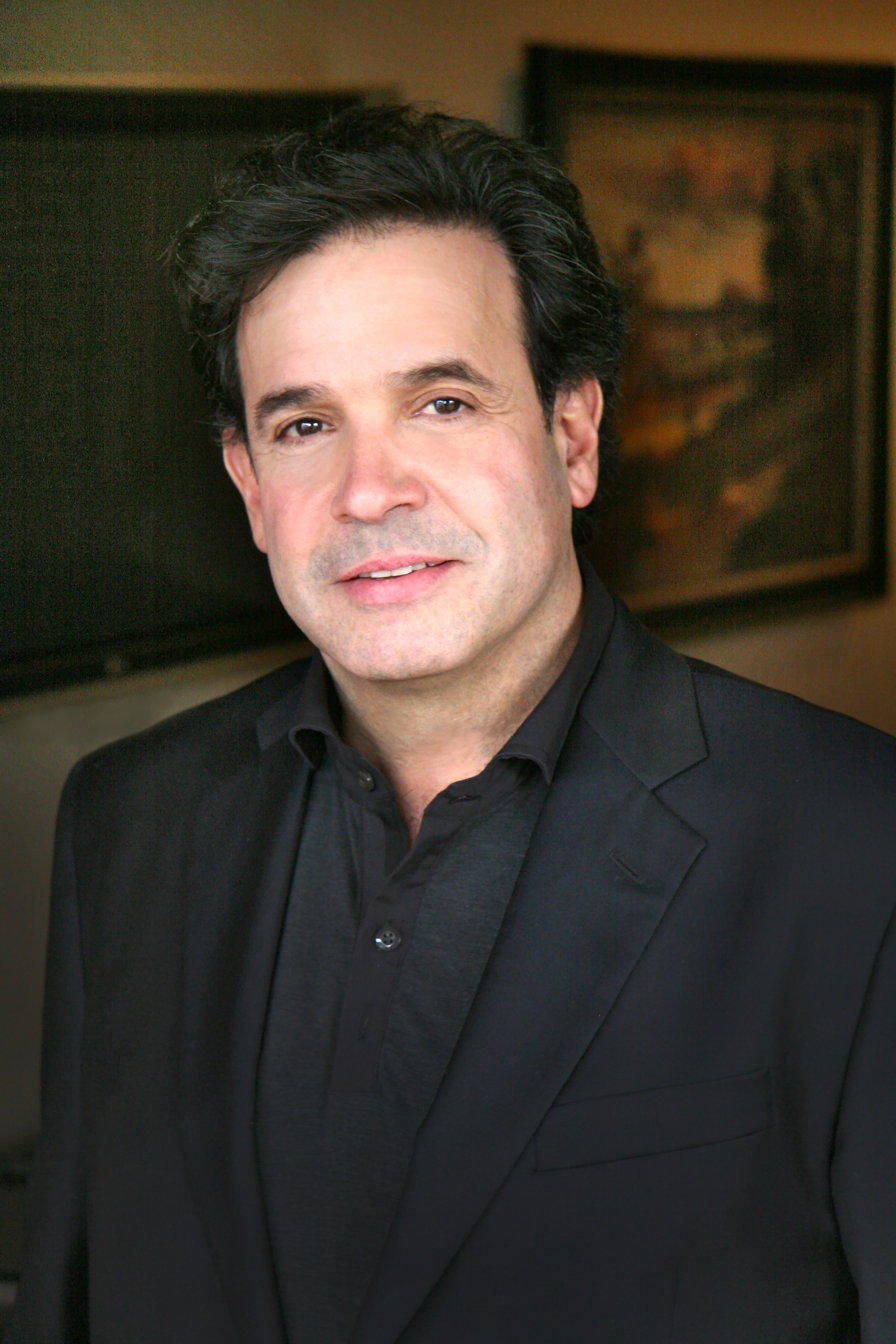
Rudolph E. Tanzi

Rudolph Emile 'Rudy' Tanzi is the Joseph P. and Rose F. Kennedy Professor of Neurology at Harvard University, and director of the Genetics and Aging Research Unit and director of the Henry and Allison McCance Center for Brain Health at Massachusetts General Hospital (MGH).

Dr. Rudy Tanzi has been investigating the genetics of neurological disease since the 1980s. He co-discovered all three familial early-onset Alzheimer's disease (FAD) genes and several other neurological disease genes including that responsible for Wilson’s disease. His team was the first to use human stem cells to create three-dimensional cell culture organoids of AD, dubbed “Alzheimer's-in-a-Dish”. The 3-D model made drug screening for AD faster and more cost-effective.

He has published over 800 research papers and has received the Metropolitan Life Award and Potamkin Prize, the two highest awards for Alzheimer’s research. He is also a member of the National Academy of Medicine and was on the TIME100 Most Influential People in the World list in 2015.

== Early life and education ==
Tanzi is a native of Cranston, Rhode Island. Tanzi received his B.S. in microbiology and B.A. in history from the University of Rochester in 1980. In 1990, he received his Ph.D. in neurobiology at Harvard Medical School, where his doctoral thesis was on the discovery and isolation of the gene that encodes amyloid precursor protein, the precursor to beta-amyloid which is a pathological hallmark of Alzheimer's disease and generally accepted as the central driver of the disease.

== Career ==
At the start of his career in 1980, Tanzi worked as a research technologist for James Gusella at Massachusetts General Hospital. There, he assisted in localizing the Huntington's disease gene; their findings were published in Nature in 1983. This was the first study to localize a disease gene purely based on genetic linkage with genomic variants.

In 1987, based on his doctoral studies at Harvard Medical School, he was the lead author of seven papers published in Science and Nature between 1987 and 1988, describing the initial cloning, mapping, and characterization of the gene encoding the amyloid beta-protein precursor (APP), the first reported Alzheimer’s disease gene. Two other groups reported the cloning of APP at that time. In 1991-1992, Tanzi and Wilma Wasco, discovered the two APP family members, APLP1 and APLP2.

In 1995, Tanzi collaborated with Drs. Peter Hyslop and Jerry Schellenberg to discover the two other EO-FAD genes, presenilin 1 and 2 (PSEN1 and PSEN2). He has published many key studies characterizing the role of the EO-FAD genes in health and disease. All three genes remain among the most highly studied drug targets in the field of AD aimed at reducing beta-amyloid deposition.

In 1993, Tanzi first discovered the gene for the neurodegenerative disease, Wilson's disease; his findings were published in Nature Genetics. In that same year, he contributed to the discovery of the first familial amyotrophic lateral sclerosis (ALS) gene, SOD1, by providing the key genetic and physical mapping data for chromosome 21 used to find the gene defect.

As the leader of the Cure Alzheimer's Fund's Alzheimer's Genome Project, Tanzi several other AD genes, most notably, CD33, reported in 2008 with Lars Bertram, in the American Journal of Human Genetics. In that study, Tanzi reported the first family-based genome-wide association study of AD, which most notably to the identification of the first innate immune microglial AD gene, CD33, which encodes a cell-surface receptor on monocytes and microglia. In 2013, Tanzi and Dr. Ana Griciuc first reported in Neuron that increased expression of CD33 in microglial cells in AD brain and showed that a protective CD33 gene variant was associated with reductions in CD33 expression and Abeta levels in AD brain. Importantly, they showed CD33 inhibits microglial phagocytosis and clearance of Abeta and induces pro-inflammatory cytokine release leading to neuroinflammation. They also elucidated the molecular mechanism by which sialic acid binds to CD33 to induce neuroinflammation.

In a follow-up study published in Neuron in 2019, Tanzi and Griciuc compared the neuroinflammatory effects of the CD33 gene to another AD-associated innate immune gene, TREM2. Knockout of CD33 in AD mice attenuated amyloid-beta pathology and improved cognition while knockout of TREM2 led to opposite effects. They then showed that TREM2 functions downstream of CD33 and that crosstalk between CD33 and TREM2 involves the neuroinflammation-related IL-1beta/IL-1RN axis cluster. CD33 has now emerged as the primary target for novel drug discovery programs aimed at curbing neuroinflammation, at over a dozen pharmaceutical and biotech companies. Other AD genes Tanzi has discovered include ADAM10, UBQLN1, IDE, A2M, ITGB3, and ATXN1. In 2020, he used multiple whole genome sequencing datasets for the first time to identify sex-specific genetic risk factors for AD (ZBTB7C, GRID1, RIOK3, MCPH1) as well as several novel Alzheimer's disease-associated rare variants in loci related to synaptic function and neuronal development (FNBP1L, SEL1L, LINC00298, PRKCH, C15ORF41, C2CD3, KIF2A, APC, LHX9, NALCN, CTNNA2, SYTL3, CLSTN2, DTNB, DLG2). In 2022, Tanzi and colleagues whole-genome sequencing to discover two new genes associated with Alzheimer's disease: DTNB and DLG2.

Over the past three decades, Tanzi has also contributed to the development of novel therapeutics for AD. In 2000, Tanzi and the late Dr. Steven Wagner discovered a class of Alzheimer’s drugs that they termed "gamma secretase modulators (GSM)". GSM's reverse the Abeta42:Abeta40 ratio and thereby prevent amyloid plaques. Notably, they do not inhibit gamma-secretase. Tanzi and Wagner have published several papers on these compounds. Their GSM is now slated for AD clinical trials in 2026 with Acta Pharmaceuticals.

In 2014, Tanzi, and his ex-trainees, Doo Yeon Kim and Se Hoon Choi, were the first to use human stem cells to create three-dimensional cell culture organoids of AD, dubbed by The New York Times as “Alzheimer's-in-a-Dish”. This model was the first to recapitulate all three key AD pathological hallmarks in vitro, and, most importantly, resolved a decades-long debate as to whether Abeta pathology causes the formation of neurofibrillary tangles. Using this system, they were the first to definitively show that amyloid plaques directly cause neurofibrillary tangles, something that could not be shown in mouse models of early-onset familial AD gene mutations in APP and the presenilins (owing to differences in mouse and human isoforms of the Tau protein, the principal component of neurofibrillary tangles). This 3-D cell culture model/human brain organoid system of AD has also made drug screening considerably faster and more cost-effective. Most recently, using a modified 3-D human stem cell-derived neural-glial cell AD model, Tanzi has helped develop therapies targeted against neuroinflammation in AD.

In another set of groundbreaking studies, Tanzi, working with the late Dr. Robert Moir, investigated whether amyloid beta (Abeta) may play a normal role in the brain. They demonstrated Abeta to be a potent antimicrobial peptide (AMP) in the brain's innate immune system. In 2018, they showed Herpes viruses trigger plaque pathology in AD. Tanzi and Moir refer to this as the “antimicrobial protection hypothesis” of AD. In 2025, Tanzi and Will Eimer reported in Nature Neuroscience that Alzheimer’s-related tau-tangles protect against herpes virus infection in the brain. Based on this, Tanzi has proposed that Alzheimer’s pathology - amyloid plaques, tau-tangles, and neuroinflammation - evolved as an orchestrated host defense system for the brain

In other studies, Tanzi and his trainee, Zhongcong Xie, published several seminal papers providing the first evidence that the widely used general inhalant anesthetic, isoflurane, induces Abeta generation, apoptosis, and neurodegeneration in the mouse brain and post-operative CSF of patients. This has gradually led to a dramatic reduction in the clinical use of isoflurane in the operating room, especially in elderly patients and Alzheimer's patients.

Music

In musical pursuits, Tanzi has served as a studio keyboard player for Joe Perry and Aerosmith. He also co-wrote the tribute song to Alzheimer's patients called "Remember Me", performed by singer Chris Mann. He plays keyboards on the albums: Aerosmith: Music from Another Dimension by Aerosmith and Joe Perry's Switzerland Manifesto and Switzerland Manifesto MKII He has also performed with the legendary opera star, Renee Fleming.

== Awards and honors ==
Tanzi has received numerous awards, including the two highest awards for Alzheimer's disease research: The Metlife Foundation Award for Medical Research in Alzheimer's Disease Award and The Potamkin Prize. He was included on the list of the "Harvard 100 Most Influential Alumni", and was chosen by the Geoffrey Beene Foundation as a “Rock Star of Science”. In 2015, he was named by Time to the Time 100 Most Influential People in the World list. In 2018, Tanzi was inducted into the Rhode Island Heritage Hall of Fame. He was also inducted into the Cranston Hall of Fame in 2000. Tanzi was awarded an honorary doctorate from The University of Rhode Island on May 17, 2015.

== Selected publications ==
=== Books ===
- Decoding Darkness: The Search for the Genetic Causes of Alzheimer's Disease. with Ann B, Parson. New York: Perseus Publishing, 2000.
- Super Brain: Unleashing the Explosive Power of Your Mind to Maximize Health, Happiness, and Spiritual Well-Being. New York: Harmony Books, Random House, 2012.
- Super Genes: Unlock the Astonishing Power of Your DNA for Optimum Health and Well-Being. New York: Harmony Books, Random House, 2015.
- The Healing Self: A Revolutionary New Plan to Supercharge Your Immunity and Stay Well for Life. New York: Harmony, Random House, 2018.

=== Articles ===
- Rosen, DR; Siddique, T; Patterson, D; Figlewicz, DA; Sapp, P; Hentati, A; Donaldson, D; Goto, J; O'Regan, JP; Deng, HX; et al. (1993). "Mutations in Cu/Zn superoxide dismutase gene are associated with familial amyotrophic lateral sclerosis". Nature. 364 (6435): 362. Bibcode:1993Natur.364..362R. doi:10.1038/364362c0. PMID 8332197.
- Gusella, JF; Wexler, NS; Conneally, PM; Naylor, SL; Anderson, MA; Tanzi, RE; Watkins, PC; Ottina, K; Wallace, MR; Sakaguchi, AY; Young, AB; Shoulson, I; Bonilla, E; Martin, JB (1983). "A polymorphic DNA marker genetically linked to Huntington's Disease". Nature. 306 (5940): 234–238. Bibcode:1983Natur.306..234G. doi:10.1038/306234a0. PMID 6316146. S2CID 4320711.
- Tanzi, RE; Gusella, JF; Watkins, PC; Bruns, GAP; St; George-Hyslop, PH; Van Keuren, ML; Patterson, D; Pagan, S; Kurnit, DM; Neve, RL. (1987). "The amyloid beta protein gene: cDNA cloning, mRNA distribution, and genetic linkage near the Alzheimer locus". Science. 235 (4791): 880–884. Bibcode:1987Sci...235..880T. doi:10.1126/science.2949367. PMID 2949367.
- Tanzi, RE; McClatchey, AI; Lamperti, ED; V-Komaroff, L; Gusella, JF; Neve, R (1988). "Protease inhibitor domain encoded by an amyloid protein precursor mRNA associated with Alzheimer's disease". Nature. 331 (6156): 528–530. Bibcode:1988Natur.331..528T. doi:10.1038/331528a0. PMID 2893290. S2CID 4277294.
- Tanzi, RE; Petrukhin, K; Chernov, I; Pellequer, JL; Wasco, W; Ross, B; Romano, DM; Brzustowicz, LM; Devoto, M; Peppercorn, J; Bush, AI; Sternlieb, I; Pirastu, M; Gusella, JF; Evgrafov, O; Penchaszadeh, GK; Honig, B; Edelman, IS; Soares, MB; Scheinberg, IH; Gilliam, TC (1993). "Identification of the Wilson's disease gene: A copper transporting ATPase with homology to the Menke's disease gene". Nature Genetics. 5 (4): 344–350. Bibcode:1993NaGen...5..344T. doi:10.1038/ng1293-344. PMID 8298641. S2CID 610188.
- Levy-Lahad, E; Wasco, W; Poorkaj, P; Romano, DM; Oshima Jm, Pettingell WH; Yu, C; Jondro, PD; Schmidt, SD; Wang, K; Crowley, AC; Fu, Y-H; Guenette, SY; Galas, D; Nemens, E; Wijsman, EM; Bird, TD; Schellenberg, GD; Tanzi, RE (1995). "Candidate gene for the chromosome 1 familial Alzheimer's disease locus". Science. 269 (5226): 973–977. Bibcode:1995Sci...269..973L. doi:10.1126/science.7638622. PMID 7638622. S2CID 27296868.
- Bertram, L; Blacker, D; Mullin, K; Keeney, D; Jones, J; Basu, S; Yhu, S; McInnis, M; Go, R; Vekrellis, K; Selkoe, D; Saunders, A; Tanzi, RE (2000). "Evidence for genetic linkage of Alzheimer's disease to chromosome 10q". Science. 290 (5500): 2302–2303. Bibcode:2000Sci...290.2302B. doi:10.1126/science.290.5500.2302. PMID 11125142.
- Bertram, L; Hiltunen, M; Parkinson, M; Ingelsson, M; Lange, C; Ramasamy, K; Mullin, K; Menon, R; Sampson, AJ; Hsiao, MY; Elliott, KJ; Moscarillo, T; Hyman, BT; Wagner, SL; Becker, KD; Blacker, D; Tanzi, RE (2005). "Family-based association between Alzheimer's disease and variants in UBQLN1". N. Engl. J. Med. 352 (9): 884–894. doi:10.1056/nejmoa042765. PMID 15745979.
- Bertram, L; McQueen, MB; Mullin, K; Blacker, D; Tanzi, RE (2007). "Systematic Meta-Analyses of Alzheimer's Disease Genetic Association Studies: The AlzGene Database". Nature Genetics. 39 (1): 17–23. Bibcode:2007NaGen..39...17B. doi:10.1038/ng1934. PMID 17192785. S2CID 452851.
- Griciuc, A; Serrano-Pozo, A; Parrado, AR; Lesinski, AN; Asselin, CN; Mullin, K; Hooli, B; Choi, SH; Hyman, BT; Tanzi, RE (2013). "Alzheimer's Disease Risk Gene CD33 Inhibits Microglial Uptake of Amyloid Beta". Neuron. 78 (4): 631–43. doi:10.1016/j.neuron.2013.04.014. PMC 3706457. PMID 23623698.
- Suh, J; Choi, SH; Romano, DM; Gannon, MA; Lesinski, AN; Kim, DY; Tanzi, RE (2013). "ADAM10 Missense Mutations Potentiate β-Amyloid Accumulation by Impairing Prodomain Chaperone Function". Neuron. 80 (2): 385–401. doi:10.1016/j.neuron.2013.08.035. PMC 4105199. PMID 24055016.
- Choi, SH; Kim, YH; Hebisch, M; Sliwinski, C; Lee, S; D'Avanzo, C; Chen, J; Hooli, B; Asselin, C; Muffat, J; Klee, JB; Zhang, C; Wainger, BJ; Peitz, M; Kovacs, DM; Woolf, CJ; Wagner, SL; Tanzi, RE; Kim, DY (2014). "A three-dimensional human neural cell culture model of Alzheimer's disease". Nature. 515 (7526): 274–8. Bibcode:2014Natur.515..274C. doi:10.1038/nature13800. PMC 4366007. PMID 25307057.
- Kumar, D; Choi, SH; Washicosky, KJ; Eimer, WA; Tucker, S; Ghofrani, J; Lefkowitz, A; McColl, G; Goldstein, LE; Tanzi, RE; Moir, RD (2016). "Amyloid-BetaPeptide Protects Against Microbial Infection In Mouse and Worm Models of Alzheimer's Disease". Sci. Transl. Med. 8 (340): 340–72. doi:10.1126/scitranslmed.aaf1059. PMC 5505565. PMID 27225182.
- Park, J; Wetzel, I; Marriott, I; Dréau, D; D'Avanzo, C; Kim, D-Y; Tanzi, RE; Cho, H (2018). "Neuron-Glia Interactions Recapitulated in a 3D Organotypic Human Alzheimer's Disease Brain Model". Nature Neuroscience. 21 (7): 941–951. doi:10.1038/s41593-018-0175-4. PMC 6800152. PMID 29950669.
- Eimer, WA; Kumar, D; Kumar, N; Breakefield, XO; Tanzi, RE; Moir, RD (2018). "Alzheimer's Disease-Associated b-Amyloid Is Rapidly Seeded by Herpesviridae to Protect against Brain Infection". Neuron. 99 (1): 1–9. doi:10.1016/j.neuron.2018.06.030. PMC 6075814. PMID 30001512.
