= Konrad Beyreuther =

German molecular biologist and chemist

- Born: 14 May 1941 (age 85); Leutersdorf, Germany
- Education: Max Planck Institute of Biochemistry (Dr.rer.nat. 1968)
- Known for: neurodegenerative diseases
- Awards: Feldberg Award (1989); Metlife Foundation Award (1990); Potamkin Prize (1990); King Faisal International Prize in Medicine (1997)
- Scientific career
- Fields: molecular biology
- Institutions: Heidelberg University; University of Cologne
- Doctoral advisor: Adolf Butenandt

Konrad Beyreuther (born 14 May 1941) is a German molecular biologist and chemist known for his work on neurodegenerative diseases.

== Life ==
Konrad Beyreuther was born the son of Ilse Beyreuther (née Bäuerle) and the Protestant pastor and later church historian Erich Beyreuther. He studied chemistry at LMU Munich and completed his doctoral thesis at the Max Planck Institute of Biochemistry in Munich under Adolf Butenandt. In 1968, he received his doctorate (Dr. rer. nat.) at LMU Munich. Subsequently, he was a research associate at the Institute of Genetics at the University of Cologne until 1978, during which time he also had research stays at Harvard University and the Medical Research Council (United Kingdom) (MRC) in Cambridge, Great Britain. In 1975, he completed his habilitation in genetics. Beyreuther was a professor at the University of Cologne until 1987. From 1987 to 2007, he was professor and chair at the Center for Molecular Biology Heidelberg (ZMBH) at Heidelberg University, where he served as director from 1998 until 2001. He was the founding director of the Network for Research on Aging at Heidelberg University, and he served as director from January 2006 until December 2023.

== Work ==
With Colin L. Masters, Beyreuther discovered the amyloid (Abeta) precursor protein (APP), a key protein in the development of Alzheimer's disease. In 1988, he collaborated with British researchers to establish that proteinaceous pathogens (now called prions) are the infectious agents that cause bovine spongiform encephalopathy (BSE) in cows. In 2001, Beyreuther was appointed by the Minister-President of Baden-Württemberg, Erwin Teufel, as an honorary State Councillor for Life and Health Protection in the state government. He also served in this capacity in the cabinet under Minister-President Günther Oettinger as the State Councillor for Life Sciences. In this role, Beyreuther advised the cabinet from a scientific perspective on matters related to the life sciences until June 2006.

== Awards ==
Bayreuther received the Robert Pfleger Research Award in 1988 and the Feldberg Award in 1989. In 1990, he won the Metlife Foundation Award for Medical Research in Alzheimer's Disease with Robert D. Terry and was awarded the Potamkin Prize jointly with Masters. Beyreuther and Masters both received Max Planck Research Awards in 1991, and shared the Zülch Prize in 1995. In 1997 they were awarded the King Faisal International Prize in Medicine together with James F. Gusella for contributions to the understanding of neurodegenerative diseases. Bayreuther has been elected to the German Academy of Sciences Leopoldina, the Heidelberg Academy for Sciences and Humanities, and the Göttingen Academy of Sciences. He is a recipient of the Order of Merit of Baden-Württemberg and the Cross of the Order of Merit of the Federal Republic of Germany.
