= Andrea Musacchio =

Italian biologist

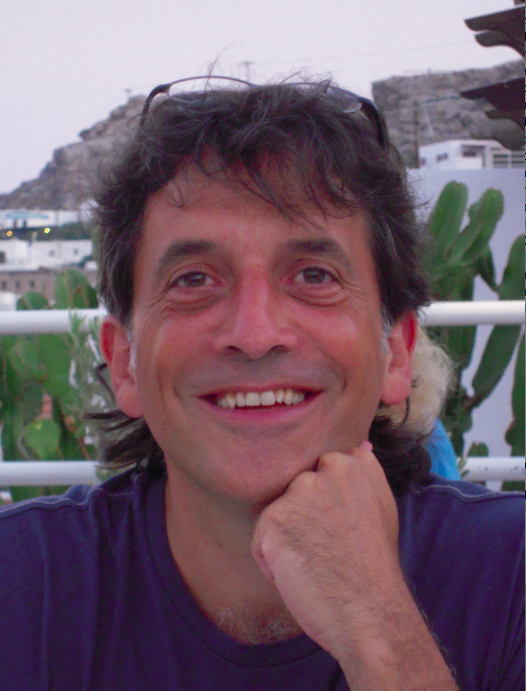
- Born: Andrea Musacchio; July 11, 1964 (age 62); Rome, Italy
- Education: University of Rome Tor Vergata, European Molecular Biology Laboratory
- Scientific career
- Fields: Crystallography
- Workplaces: Harvard Medical School, European Institute of Oncology, Max Planck Institute for Molecular Physiology
- Doctoral advisor: Matti Saraste
- Other academic advisors: Gianni Cesareni

Andrea Musacchio (born July 11, 1964) is an Italian structural biologist. He is Max Planck director at the Institute of Molecular Physiology in Dortmund. He is also Honorary Professor at the Center for Medical Biotechnology at the University of Duisburg-Essen. He was named European Molecular Biology Organization member in 2009.

== Education and career ==
Musacchio received a Laurea in Biology from the University of Rome Tor Vergata summa cum laude in 1990, and earned his Ph.D., summa cum laude, from the Heidelberg University in 1995 working at the European Molecular Biology Laboratory. For his postdoctoral studies he joined Stephen C. Harrison laboratory at the Harvard Medical School in Boston. In 1999 he returned to Italy to found his laboratory at the European Institute of Oncology in Milan, where he started working on mechanisms of cell division. He was a European Molecular Biology Organization Young Investigator from 2000-2004. Musacchio moved to Dortmund in 2011 to direct the Department of Mechanistic Cell Biology at the Max Planck Institute for Molecular Physiology

== Research ==
Musacchio approached structural biology during his Ph.D., contributing to the determination of the first crystallographic structures of the SH3 and PH domains. During his post-doctoral training, he was involved in the determination of the clathrin triskelion structure, one of the first studies combining X-ray crystallography and electron microscopy. As an independent scientist, his interests focused on the understanding of the molecular basis of mitosis, with emphasis on the spindle assembly checkpoint. Since the early days, Musacchio's lab adopted a multi-disciplinary approach merging structural biology, biochemistry and cellular biology, this way gaining comprehensive views on protein functions in living cells. He is best known for his work on Mad1/Mad2 complexes, which led to the formulation of the template model, and for his contributions to the understanding of the role of the kinase Aurora B, Mps1 and Haspin in mitosis. In 2008, the structure of the Ndc80 complex set the foundation of a new line of his investigations on kinetochore assembly and attachment to microtubules

== Personal life ==
Musacchio spent his childhood in Rome, where he grew to be a strong supporter of A.S. Roma. He has started embracing Borussia Dortmund.

He is married and father of two boys.
