= Colin L. Masters =

Australian neuropathologist (born 1947)

- Born: 5 February 1947 (age 79); Perth, Western Australia
- Education: University of Western Australia (MB BS 1970, MD 1977)
- Known for: neurodegenerative diseases
- Awards: Potamkin Prize (1990); King Faisal International Prize in Medicine (1997)
- Scientific career
- Fields: neuropathology
- Institutions: NINDS (1977-1981); Heidelberg University (1981-2); University of Western Australia (1981-9); University of Melbourne (1989-)

Colin Louis Masters MD FAA AO (born 5 Feb 1947 in Perth, Western Australia) is an Australian neuropathologist who researches Alzheimer's disease and other neurodegenerative disorders. He is laureate professor of pathology at the University of Melbourne.

== Career ==
Masters studied medicine at the University of Western Australia. He opted for an extra year of pre-medical studies in 1967, which he spent doing neuropathology research, and graduated M.B. B.S. in 1970. He completed his M.D. in medical neuropathology in 1977 after research fellowships at the University of Western Australia and Massachusetts General Hospital. After positions as visiting scientist at the National Institute of Neurological Disorders and Stroke and Humboldt fellow at Heidelberg University, he returned to Western Australia and Royal Perth Hospital in 1981 as a clinician-scientist. In 1989 he relocated to the University of Melbourne where he spent the rest of his career as consultant pathologist and professor of pathology, becoming laureate professor in 2002 and serving for six years as associate dean of research at the medical and dental school.

== Scientific achievements ==
Masters and his erstwhile colleague from Heidelberg Konrad Beyreuther were the first to characterize the amyloid protein that forms the cerebral plaques observed in Alzheimer's disease (AD) and Down's Syndrome (DS, also known as trisomy 21). Known as amyloid beta (Aβ), this peptide is derived from amyloid precursor protein (APP), which was subsequently mapped to the region of chromosome 21 that is altered in DS. The notion that Aβ causes AD, called the amyloid hypothesis, gained force from genetic studies that traced familial forms of the disease to variations in the APP gene. Masters became a prominent proponent of the amyloid hypothesis, developing strategies for anti-Alzheimer's treatments that suppress the beta secretase and gamma secretase enzymes that cleave APP to form Aβ, or modify the interactions between metal ions and Aβ that are important for its toxic effects. Despite two decades of intensive research, however, these approaches have not yielded useful drugs.

== Awards ==
Masters and Beyreuther both received Max Planck Research Awards in 1991. They also jointly won the 1990 Potamkin Prize and the 1995 Zülch Award. In 1997 they were awarded the King Faisal International Prize in Medicine, together with James F. Gusella, for contributions to the understanding of neurodegenerative diseases. Masters won the Florey Medal in 2002. In 2006, he was awarded the Grand Hamdan International Award for Medical Sciences in the field of Molecular and Cellular Pathology of Neurological Disorders. He also received a Lifetime Achievement Award in Alzheimer's Disease Research from the Alzheimer's Association. He is a fellow of the Australian Academy of Science, the Royal College of Pathologists in England, and the Royal College of Pathologists, Australia. He was elected Fellow of the Australian Academy of Health and Medical Sciences (FAHMS) in 2015. He is Honorary Doctor of Letters of the University of Western Australia (2008). He was appointed Officer of the Order of Australia on Australia Day, 2017.
