= Jan O. Korbel =

German scientist (born 1975)

Jan Korbel
- Born: Chêne-Bougeries, Switzerland
- Scientific career
- Fields: Human genetics & Computational biology
- Workplaces: European Molecular Biology Laboratory (EMBL)
- Website: embl.de

Jan O. Korbel (born 1975) is a German scientist working in the fields of human genetics, genomics and computational biology. He is the Interim Head of Site of the European Molecular Biology Laboratory (EMBL) site in Heidelberg, Germany.

== Education ==
After receiving his PhD in 2005 from Humboldt University of Berlin, he pursued his postdoctoral research at Yale University, New Haven, Connecticut (USA) with Mark B. Gerstein.

== Research and career ==
He is a tenured principal investigator, and also Heading the Data Science Centre at the EMBL. He is also a senior scientist in the Genome Biology Unit at the EMBL, is leading a bridging research division at the German Cancer Research Center (DKFZ), and is an honorary professor ("Honorarprofessor") at Heidelberg University. A particular focus of the Korbel group is on investigating a particular form of mutation, genomic structural variation, which includes deletions, inversions and more complex chromosomal rearrangements such as chromothripsis events that can occur in healthy individuals and in context of disease. His group's principal research objective is to understand genomic structural variations as a basis of phenotypic variation and cancer development.

In addition to his research activities, Jan Korbel is promoting interdisciplinary dialogues in bioethics, and the application of genome sequencing in Genomic Medicine.

== Awards and recognition ==
He received several academic prizes, including:

- the Chica and Heinz Schaller Research Award (2014),
- the Manfred-Fuchs-Prize for his bioethical research (2015),
- the 2018 HMLS Investigator Award,
- and the Pezcoller Foundation–EACR Cancer Researcher Award (2018).

He is an elected member of Germany's National Academy of Sciences Leopoldina (2015) and of the European Molecular Biology Organization (EMBO) (2016). He is also a fellow of the European Academy of Cancer Sciences. Jan Korbel is also a European Research Council (ERC) investigator.
