= Roger S. Goody =

English chemist (born 1944)

Roger Goody FRS
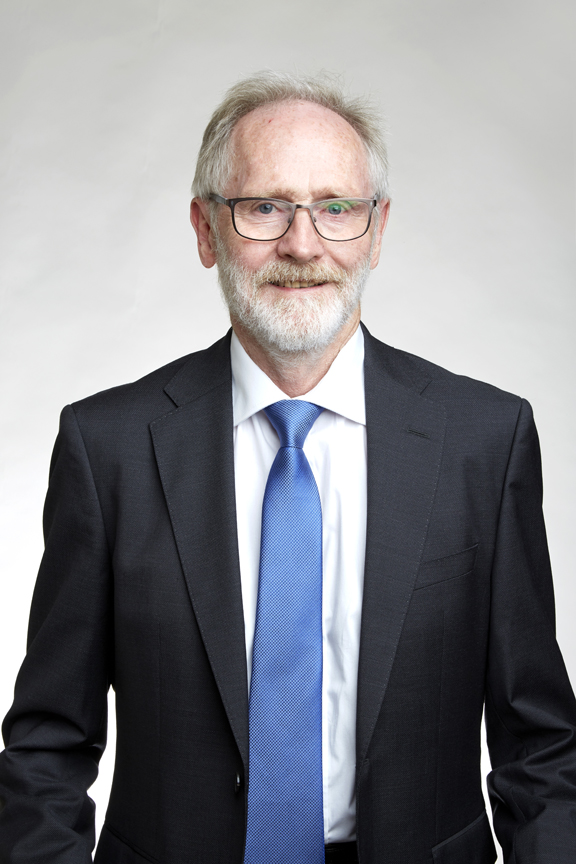
- Goody in 2018
- Born: Roger Sidney Goody; 17 April 1944 (age 82); Northampton, England
- Education: University of Birmingham
- Awards: EMBO Member; Max Planck Prize; German Academy of Sciences Leopoldina; Max Bergmann Medal; Feldberg Prize; Fellow of the Royal Society
- Scientific career
- Institutions: Memorial Sloan-Kettering Cancer Center; Max Planck Institute of Molecular Physiology
- Thesis: Studies on the chemistry of cytosine and its derivatives (1968)
- Academic advisors: Linus Pauling, James Watson, Melvin Calvin
- Website: www.mpi-dortmund.mpg.de/research-groups/goody

Roger Sidney Goody (born 17 April 1944, in Northampton) is an English chemist who served as director at the Max Planck Institute for Molecular Physiology in Dortmund from 1993 until 2013. Since 2013 he is Emeritus Director of the institute.

== Education ==
Goody studied Chemistry at the University of Birmingham, England, where he was awarded a PhD in 1968 for studies on the chemistry of cytosine.

== Career and research ==
After his PhD, Goody was appointed a postdoctoral researcher at the Memorial Sloan-Kettering Cancer Center in New York City, NY, USA in the field of natural products research. In 1970 he became a scientific fellow at the Max Planck Institute for Experimental Medicine, Göttingen in the field of nucleotide research. From 1972 till 1993 he was a group leader at the Max Planck Institute for Medical Research, Heidelberg in the field of enzymology and nucleotide research, with a focus on actin, myosin, adenylate kinase, EF-Tu, HRAS-p21, reverse transcriptase, nucleotides and nucleic acid sequencing. An overriding theme of his research interests has been the transient states of enzymes, along the enzyme reaction pathway, against the background of selective and specific ligand-protein interactions and structure-function relationships. In 1983 he habilitated at the faculty for biochemistry and biophysics of the University of Heidelberg and was announced adjunct professor in 1990. In 1993 he accepted the position of Director at the Max Planck Institute for Molecular Physiology, Dortmund and became a scientific fellow of the Max Planck Society. Since 2004 he has also held a full professorship in biochemistry (supramolecular systems) at the Ruhr University Bochum, with a dual emphasis on higher education and fundamental research.

Goody has combined chemistry, structural biology and kinetics to make major contributions in several fields of biology. He pioneered the use of nucleotide analogs, synthesized at the beginning of his career, in muscle research and later for Ras-family GTPases, leading to the first ever structure determination of an unstable protein-substrate complex (Ras:GTP). Innovative use of semi-synthetic proteins led to an understanding of transport mechanisms of Rab GTPases and to resolution of a longstanding controversy concerning targeting of these proteins to membranes. His group discovered and characterized hitherto unrecognized covalent modifications of Rab proteins by bacteria.

=== Honours, awards and memberships ===
From 2013 to 2015, Goody was President of the German Society for Biochemistry and molecular Biology (GBM). In 2018 he was elected Fellow of the Royal Society.

- President of the German Society of Biochemistry and molecular Biology
- German Academy of Sciences Leopoldina (since 2003)
- Max Bergman Society
- Awarded membership of the European Molecular Biology Organization (EMBO)
- Member of the Scientific Advisory Board of the Max Delbrück Center for Molecular Medicine (MDC) Berlin Buch
- Chairman of the Study Section for Biochemistry, Biophysics and Structural Biology of the Deutsche Forschungsgemeinschaft (German National Research Organization) - 2000-2009
- 1991: Max Planck Prize
- 2003: German Academy of Sciences Leopoldina
- 2008: Max Bergmann Medal
- 2012: Astbury Lecture - Astbury Society, Leeds
- 2012: Xu Guangqi Lecture, CAS-Max-Planck Partner Institute, Shanghai China
- 2015: Feldberg Prize
- 2018: Elected Fellow of the Royal Society (FRS)
- 2024: Cothenius Medal

== Personal life ==
Goody is married to the biologist Dr. Waltraud Hofmann-Goody and has two children.
