= Randal J. Kaufman =

American research professor

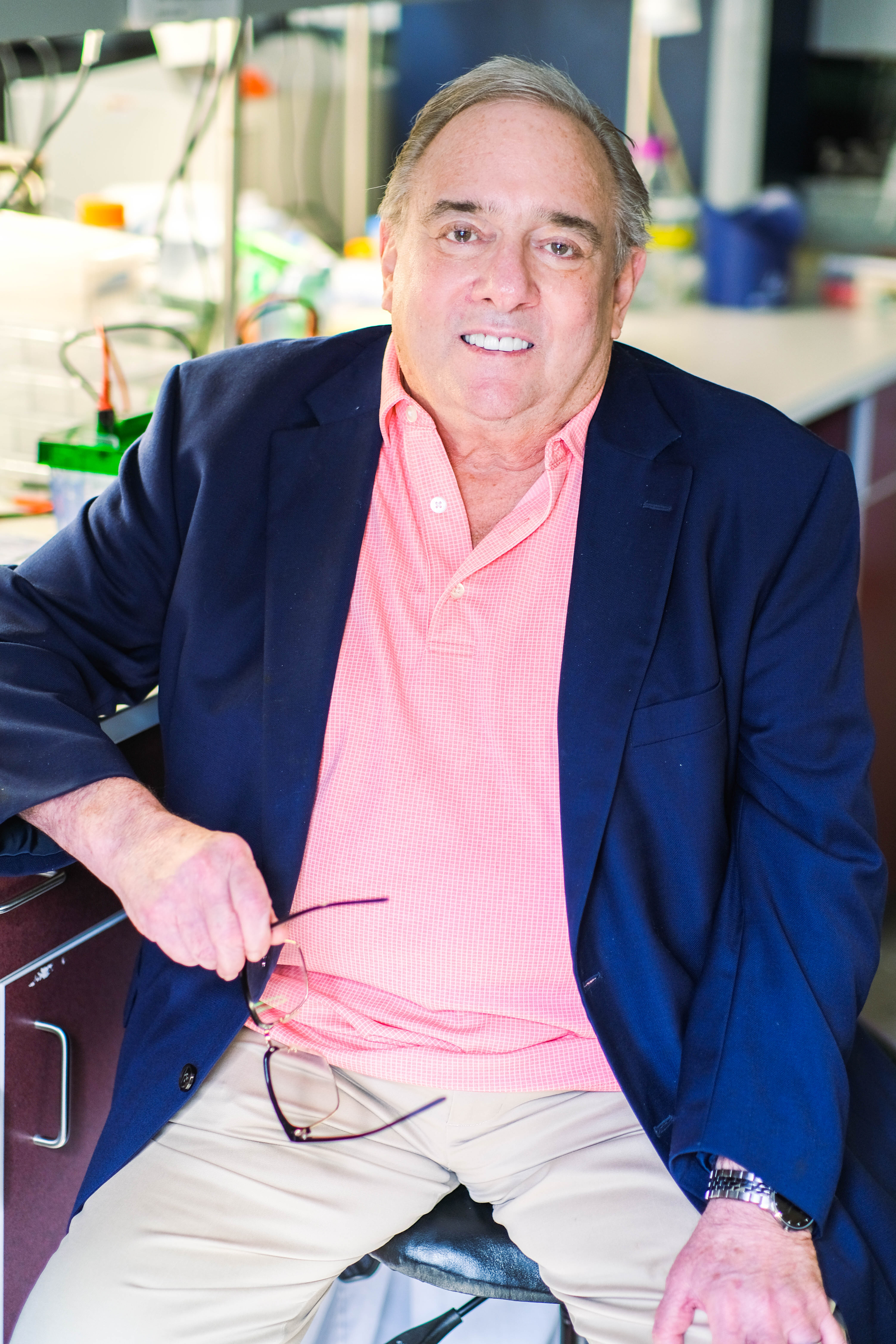
- Born: Denver, Colorado, U.S.
- Education: University of Colorado, Boulder
- Scientific career
- Fields: Hemophilia, metabolic disease, diabetes, inflammation, cancer, neurodegeneration Cellular and Molecular Biology
- Workplaces: Genetics Institute Inc., Cambridge, Massachusetts Howard Hughes Medical Institute, Ann Arbor, Michigan University of Michigan Medical Center, Ann Arbor Sanford Burnham Prebys Medical Discovery Institute (SBP), La Jolla, California
- Thesis: Development and Maintenance of Drugs Resistance in Cultured Mammalian Cells
- Doctoral advisor: Robert Schimke, Stanford University, Palo Alto CA

Randal J. Kaufman is the director and a professor of the Degenerative Diseases Program, Neuroscience and Aging Center at Sanford Burnham Prebys Medical Discovery Institute and an adjunct professor in the Department of Pharmacology at the UC San Diego School of Medicine.

== Biography ==
Kaufman received his BA at the University of Colorado and went on to obtain his Ph.D. in pharmacology at Stanford University and undertook postdoctoral studies at the Center for Cancer Research at M.I.T., where he was a Helen Hay Whitney postdoctoral fellow with Nobel laureate Phillip Allen Sharp. From 1994–2011, Kaufman was Professor of Biological Chemistry and Internal Medicine, Endowed Chair of Medicine and Investigator of Howard Hughes Medical Research Institute at the University of Michigan Medical School. He joined Sanford Burnham Prebys in 2011.

== Awards and honors ==
- 1993: Dr. Murray Thelin Award, National Hemophilia Foundation
- 1998: International Association Francaise Des Hemophiles Award, "Prix Henri Chaigneau"
- 1999: Investigator Recognition Award, Intl. Soc. Thrombosis & Haemostasis (ISTH)
- 2000: Distinguished Investigator Award-MI Hemophilia Society
- 2003: Van Wezel Prize, European Society of Animal Cell Technology (ESACT)
- 2006: Fellow of the American Association for the Advancement of Science
- 2007-2017: NIH NIDDK MERIT Award
- 2014, 2015: Thomson Reuters World's Most Influential Scientific Minds in Biochemistry & Biology
- 2015: Society for Free Radical Research (SFRR), Clinical Science Award
- 2016: Endowed Chair in Cell Biology. SBP Medical Discovery Institute
- 2019: Clarivate's Web of Science Group of Highly Cited Researchers
- 2021: Clarivate's Web of Science Group of Highly Cited Researchers
- 2022: Research.com “Best Scientist Award”
- 2023: Research.com “Biology and Biochemistry in United States Leader Award”
- 2023: Clarivate's Web of Science Group of Highly Cited Researchers
