= David Housman =

American geneticist

- Born: July 30, 1946 (age 80)
- Education: Brandeis University
- Scientific career
- Fields: Genetics, Cancer Biology
- Doctoral students: David L. Nelson; James F. Gusella

David E. Housman is an American geneticist. He is the Virginia and D.K. Ludwig Professor for Cancer Research in the Koch Institute for Integrative Cancer Research at the Massachusetts Institute of Technology. He is known for his contribution to the discovery of the HTT gene that causes Huntington's disease.

== Early life ==
David Housman was born on July 30, 1946. As a child he was a control in the original Salk polio vaccine trials in New York, an early experience that left him interested in how clinical trials could be more efficiently conducted.

== Academic career ==
Housman received his BA in 1966 and MA in 1971 from Brandeis University. As one of the first postdocs in the lab of Harvey Lodish at MIT, Housman showed that all mammalian proteins begin with a methionine residue transferred from a specific met-initiator tRNA. Between 1973 and 1975 he taught at the University of Toronto and was on the staff of the Ontario Cancer Institute. He joined the MIT faculty in 1975. In his lab at MIT, he mentored Jim Gusella and Daniel Haber.

Housman has co-founded five biotech companies: Integrated Genetics (now part of Genzyme), Somatix Therapy Corp, Viariagenics, Kenna Technologies, and Audacity Therapeutics.

== Research ==
Housman's research is focused on the genetics of hereditary disease, cancer, and cardiovascular disease. His laboratory studies the WT1 gene, whose mutation causes the Wilms’ tumor in the kidneys, and is exploring it as a therapeutic target for leukemia.

In 1978 Housman received a grant from the Hereditary Disease Foundation to search for the gene behind Huntington's disease using genetic markers, and embarked on this work with Jim Gusella, then a postdoc in his lab at MIT. This led to the discovery of the neighborhood of the gene by Gusella's lab at Massachusetts General Hospital in 1983. The Housman lab is currently investigating the modifier genes responsible for determining the age of onset for Huntington's.

== Awards and honors ==
- American Association for the Advancement of Science (1988)
- MIT Science Council Teaching Prize (1992)
- American Academy of Microbiology (1994)
- National Academy of Sciences (1994)
- National Academy of Medicine (1998)
- National Biotechnology Award – National Conference on Biotechnology Ventures
