= James F. Gusella =

Canadian molecular biologist

- Born: 1952 (age 73–74); Ottawa, Ontario
- Citizenship: Canada
- Education: University of Ottawa (B.Sc.); University of Toronto (M.Sc.); Massachusetts Institute of Technology (Ph.D.)
- Known for: Contributing to identification of the gene that causes Huntington's disease
- Awards: William Allan Award (2016); Fellow of the American Association for the Advancement of Science (2007); Neuronal Plasticity Prize (2004); Charles A. Dana Award (1998); King Faisal Prize in Medicine (1997); Taylor Prize (1994); Metlife Foundation Award (1987)
- Scientific career
- Fields: genetics, neurology
- Workplaces: Harvard Medical School; Massachusetts General Hospital; Broad Institute
- Thesis: Selection and localization of cloned DNA sequences from human chromosome 11 (1980)
- Doctoral advisor: David Housman
- Doctoral students: Rudolph E. Tanzi

James Francis Gusella (born 1952 in Ottawa) is a Canadian molecular biologist and geneticist known for his work on Huntington's disease and other neurodegenerative diseases in humans. He is the Bullard Professor of Neurogenetics in the Department of Genetics at Harvard Medical School and an investigator at the Center for Genomic Medicine at the Mass General Research Institute.

== Early life and education ==
Gusella was born in Ottawa, Canada. He received his Bachelor of Science degree in biology from the University of Ottawa in 1974, and his Ph.D. in biology from the Massachusetts Institute of Technology in 1980. As a doctoral student of David Housman, Gusella developed linkage analysis techniques using restriction fragment length polymorphisms (RFLPs) to identify human disease genes.

== Career ==
Gusella joined the faculty of Harvard Medical School in 1980, where he began collaborating with Nancy Wexler to study the genetic basis of Huntington's disease. Through linkage analysis of a large Venezuelan population of Huntington's disease kindreds, they mapped the location of the causal gene to the short arm of chromosome 4 in 1983. This achievement marked the first time that a human disease gene had been localized to a specific chromosome using anonymous DNA markers.

Building on this success, the team cloned the huntingtin gene in 1993 and established the CAG trinucleotide repeat expansion as the underlying genetic etiology of Huntington's disease. Gusella's lab employed similar strategies to identify genes responsible for neurofibromatosis type 2 and a familial form of Alzheimer's disease.

In 1999, along with Cynthia Morton, he co-founded the Developmental Genome Anatomy Project (DGAP), harnessing de novo balanced chromosomal rearrangements to identify genes associated with autism and other neurodevelopmental disorders.

Gusella was a founding director of the Center for Human Genetic Research (now known as the Center for Genomic Medicine) at Massachusetts General Hospital in 2003.

Gusella and David Housman were among the founders of Integrated Genetics (now part of Genzyme), who introduced the first diagnostic test for Huntington's disease in 1986.

== Awards and honors ==
In 1997, Gusella was awarded the King Faisal Prize in Medicine together with Konrad Beyreuther and Colin L. Masters for contributions to the understanding of neurodegenerative diseases. He has also received the Metlife Foundation Award for Medical Research in Alzheimer's Disease (1987), the Taylor Prize (1994), the Charles A. Dana Award for Pioneering Achievement in Health and Education (1998), the Neuronal Plasticity Prize (2004).

He was elected as a fellow of the American Academy of Arts and Sciences in 2007, and he received the William Allan Award of the American Society of Human Genetics in 2016.
