= Robert Schimke =

American biochemist (1932–2014)

- Born: October 25, 1932; Spokane, Washington, U.S.
- Died: September 6, 2014 (aged 81); Palo Alto, California, U.S.
- Education: Stanford University (A.B., M.D.)
- Known for: Gene Amplification
- Awards: Pfizer Award in Enzyme Chemistry (1969); Boris Pregel Award (1974), William C. Rose Award (1983); Alfred P. Sloan Jr. Prize (1985); Lila and Murray Gruber Memorial Cancer Research Award (1988); Wallace E. Sterling Prize (2009)
- Scientific career
- Fields: Biology
- Workplaces: Stanford University; National Institutes of Health
- Doctoral students: Frederick Alt, Daniel Haber, Randal J. Kaufman

Robert Tod Schimke (October 25, 1932 – September 6, 2014) was an American biochemist and cancer researcher.

He was born in Spokane, Washington, the son of a dentist and a homemaker. Schimke obtained an undergraduate degree from Stanford University in 1954, and an MD degree in 1958.

From 1958 to 1960 he performed internship and residency training at Massachusetts General Hospital. From 1960 to 1966 he served in the Public Health Service at the National Institutes of Health, where he worked on the way dietary changes affect the enzymes controlling the urea cycle in rats. In 1966 he returned to Stanford, where from 1969 to 1972 he was on the board of the faculty of pharmacology, and from 1978 to 1982 he was chairman of the department of biology.

At Stanford he examined the effects of steroid hormones on the synthesis of certain proteins, leading to new techniques in genetic engineering. In 1977, he (and doctoral student Fred Alt) discovered the phenomenon of gene amplification in mammalian cells. This discovery had great importance for cancer research, for example, in understanding the genetic instability of cancer cells and the mechanisms by which cancer cells can resist chemotherapy. The mechanism also found applications in biotechnology, for example in the production of proteins, including erythropoietin, of which he helped to develop a commercial version.

Later he studied regulatory mechanisms in the cells, including the regulation of apoptosis. He was a research professor of the American Cancer Society and later professor emeritus at Stanford.

In 1985, he received the Alfred P. Sloan, Jr. Prize for Cancer Research. He was a member of the National Academy of Sciences, the Institute of Medicine, and the American Academy of Arts and Sciences. He was president of the American Society for Biochemistry and Molecular Biology.

In 1995, Schimke was injured when a car struck the bicycle he was riding. He recovered, but needed to use a wheelchair for the rest of his life. After the accident, he focused on his art, particularly painting.

In 2009, the Stanford School of Medicine recognized his many contributions with the J. E. Wallace Sterling Lifetime Achievement Award.
