= Vassilis Pachnis =

Greek medical researcher

Vassilis Pachnis FRS FMedSci
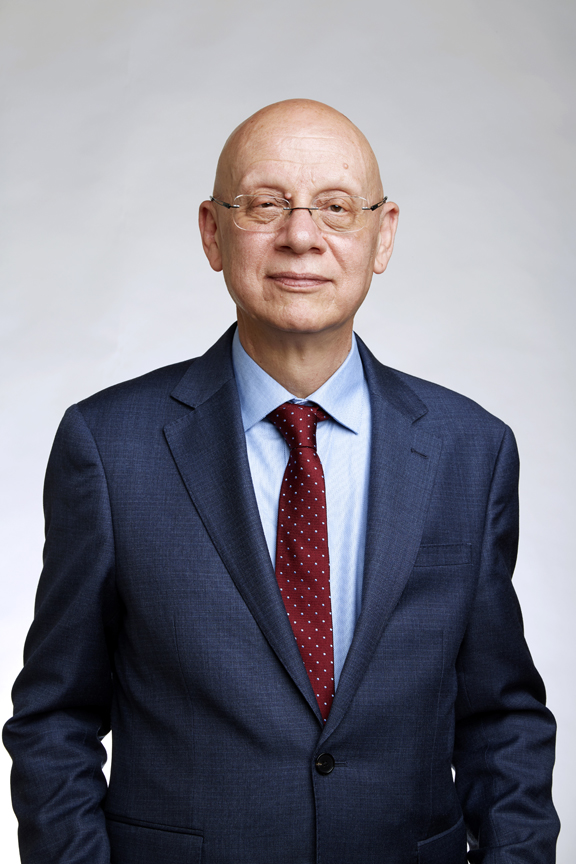
- Pachnis in 2018
- Born: Greek: Βασίλης Πάχνης
- Education: University of Athens; University of Pennsylvania (PhD)
- Awards: EMBO Member (2007)
- Scientific career
- Workplaces: Francis Crick Institute; Columbia University
- Thesis: Identification and characterization of the H19 locus which is under the control of the murine raf and rif genes (1987)
- Doctoral advisor: Shirley M. Tilghman
- Other academic advisors: Richard Axel
- Website: www.crick.ac.uk/research/labs/vassilis-pachnis

Vassilis Pachnis (Greek: Βασίλης Πάχνης) is a Greek medical researcher who is Senior Group Leader in the Development and Homeostasis of the Nervous System Laboratory at the Francis Crick Institute.

== Education ==
Pachnis was born and raised in Greece. He graduated from the University of Athens in 1980, where he studied medicine. From 1980 until 1986 he worked for his PhD in the laboratory of Shirley Tilghman at the University of Pennsylvania and the Fox Chase Cancer Center where his research identified and characterised the H19 gene.

== Career and research ==
From 1986 until 1991 he did postdoctoral research in the laboratories of Richard Axel and Frank Costantini at Columbia University. In 1991 he moved to the UK and since then has been a research group leader, first at the Medical Research Council (MRC) National Institute for Medical Research (NIMR) and subsequently at the Francis Crick Institute.

=== Awards and honours ===
Pachnis was elected a Fellow of the Royal Society in 2018 and awarded membership of the European Molecular Biology Organization (EMBO) in 2007.
