= Rohini Kuner =

Rohini Kuner (born 28 July 1970 in Bombay) is an Indian-born German pharmacologist and director of the Institute of Pharmacology at Heidelberg University.

== Vita ==
After studying pharmacology in India she obtained her PhD from University of Iowa in the laboratory of Gerald Gebhart studying the role of spinal NMDA-receptors in nociception.

From 1995 she was a Postdoc with Peter Seeburg at Heidelberg University. In 2002 she started her own lab through the Emmy Noether Program of the German Research Council. Since 2006 she is the chair for molecular pharmacology at Heidelberg University.

Since 2015 she heads the collaborative research center "SFB 1158: From nociception to chronic pain".

Rohini Kuner is married to the German neuroscientist Thomas Kuner. In October 2018 she was elected as member of the Heidelberg University Council.

== Research ==
She aims at understanding molecular mechanisms underlying chronic pain resulting from long-lasting inflammation or cancer. A major focus is laid on addressing signalling mechanisms which underlie activity-dependent changes in primary sensory neurons transmitting pain (nociceptors) and their synapses in the spinal dorsal horn. Her current work spans molecular, genetic, behavioural, electrophysiological and imaging approaches in vitro as well as in vivo in rodent models of pathological pain.

== Awards ==
- 2024: Leibniz Prize
- 2019: Member of the German Academy of Sciences Leopoldina
- 2018: Phoenix Prize for Pharmacology and Clinical Medicine
- 2018: Feldberg Foundation Prize
- 2017: HMLS Investigator Award
- 2017: Novartis Award for Therapy-Related Research
- 2015: Novartis Award
- 2012: ERC Advanced Grant
- 2010: Pat Wall International Young Investigator Award, International Association for the Study of Pain
- 2007: Pain Research Award, German Society for the Study of Pain
- 2007: Ingrid-zu-Solms-Science Award
- 2006: Chica and Heinz Schaller Award
- 2006: Bergius-Kuhn-Meyerhof-Young Researcher Award (Heidelberg Roatry Club)
- 2005: Rudolf-Buchheim-Award of the German Society for experimental and clinical Pharmacology and Toxicology
