= Daniel A. Haber =

French oncologist

- Education: Massachusetts Institute of Technology, Stanford University
- Known for: Cancer Genetics
- Scientific career
- Fields: Genetics
- Workplaces: Harvard University
- Doctoral advisor: Robert T. Schimke
- Other academic advisors: David E. Housman

Daniel A. Haber is the director of the Massachusetts General Hospital Cancer Center, a professor of oncology at Harvard Medical School, and an investigator of the Howard Hughes Medical Institute (HHMI).

== Career ==
Haber earned his B.S. in life sciences and M.S. in toxicology from Massachusetts Institute of Technology, and his M.D. and Ph.D. in biophysics from Stanford University School of Medicine under the mentorship of Robert T. Schimke. He did his postdoctoral training at the Massachusetts Institute of Technology with David E. Housman.

As a postdoc, he started to study Wilms' tumor and characterized the tumor suppressor gene WT1 and WTX. In 2003, he recognized that certain patients with lung cancer responded well to the drug Iressa whereas few other patients showed effect. Sequencing the patient's cancers, they identified specific mutation in epidermal growth factor receptor (EGFR) that resulted in sensitivity to certain drugs. By linking mutations to drug sensitivity, they were able to propose new mechanisms for targeted therapies by examining the accumulation of certain mutations in cancer cells. His lab is now focused on studying the genetics of cancer particularly in circulating tumor cells with Mehmet Toner.

He is a fellow of the American Academy of Arts and Sciences and a member of the National Academy of Medicine, the National Academy of Sciences, the Association of American Physicians, and the American Society for Clinical Investigation. He is an editor of Cell and Cancer Cell.
