= Hannes Stockinger =

Austrian scientist and professor

Hannes Stockinger (born 8 May 1955) is an Austrian scientist, university professor and since 2010 Head of the Centre for Pathophysiology, Infectiology and Immunology and the Institute for Hygiene and Applied Immunology at the Medical University of Vienna.

== Career ==
Hannes Stockinger studied Biotechnology at the University of Natural Resources and Life Sciences, Vienna and received his doctorate from this University in 1985. At the Medical University of Vienna, he is currently full professor for molecular immunology and Head of the Center for Pathophysiology, Infectiology and Immunology and of one of its subunits, the Institute for Hygiene and Applied Immunology. He is co-founder of the Competence Center for Biomolecular Therapeutics, a precompetitive platform at the Medical University of Vienna (who is the main shareholder of this institution) with the pharmaceutical industry which aimed to identify targets for the treatment of inflammatory and immunological diseases. His international scientific acceptance and recognition in immunology is reflected in the variety of functions in national and international scientific societies and organizations, in which he was elected or asked during his career: He was amongst others President of the Austrian Society for Allergology and Immunology (ÖGAI), board member of the Austrian Science Fund (FWF) and Treasurer of the European Association of Immunological Societies (EFIS). Furthermore, Hannes Stockinger is executive editor of the scientific journals Immunology Letters and BioMed Research International.

== Research ==
Hannes Stockinger and his research team discovered and described for the first time a number of critical receptors on the surface of immune cells, which not only provide an insight into the regulation of the immune system, but are also potential targets for therapeutic purposes. In addition, his research on cell membrane structures called lipid rafts is of significant importance: Today, it is believed that these lipid-rafts are the first coordinating points of the cell, which process and control the signals from the environment.

== Publications ==
His work on the first description of a number of cell surface receptors of human immune cells (such as CD31, CD147, etc.) and the contributions to the understanding of signal transduction across the plasma membrane by the lipid-rafts are highly regarded. The results of his research are published in more than 200 scientific papers, some of them in highest level journals such as Cell, Nature Methods, Science, Science Signaling, Journal of Experimental Medicine. For his pioneering research, Hannes Stockinger received numerous prestigious awards, including the Austrian Cross of Honour for Science and Art, 1st Class.
