= Ileana Hanganu-Opatz =

Romanian academic

Ileana Hanganu-Opatz (born June 20, 1975) is a Romanian academic and a leader of the Institute of Developmental Neurophysiology at the University Medical Center Hamburg-Eppendorf, in Germany.

== Early life and education ==
Born in Bucharest, Romania in 1975, Opatz first studied Mathematics before pursuing Biology and Biochemistry at the University of Bucharest from 1994 to 1998. She then studied cellular physiology at the University of Hamburg Germany, where she was supported by a TEMPUS fellowship. Hanganu-Optaz completed her PhD at Heinrich Heine University in Dusseldorf, Germany in 2002, where she studied brain wiring and cortical development. Hanganu-Opatz received a fellowship for the Neuroscience Graduate Program, "Pathologische Prozesse des Nervensystems: Vom Gen zum Verhalten," providing her with specialized training and resources to delve deeper into her research interests. She joined Yehezkel Ben-Ari's laboratory at the Institute of Neurobiology of the Mediterranean sea (INMED) for her postdoctoral training.

== Career ==
In 2017, Optaz became the leader of the Institute for Developmental Neurophysiology at the University Medical Center of Hamburg-Eppendorf. In 2022, she became the Director of the Hamburg Center of Neuroscience. She is the recipient of Emmy Noether Grant (2008) and an ERC Consolidator grant. She is the coordinator of DFG Priority Program 1665 and the Research Unit 5159, as well as a member of the FENS Committee of Higher Education and Training Committee (CHET) at the FENS forum.

Her current research combines electrophysiological methods and optogenetics with imaging and behavioral assessments to study the role of early network oscillations in the development of cognition and sensory perception, uni- and multisensory processing and ontogeny, as well as pathophysiology of neurological and neuropsychiatric disorders.

== Awards and honors ==
Ileana Hanganu-Opatz was awarded the Dagmar Eissner Award in 2003 for her pioneering PhD work focused on brain wiring and cortical development. This award acknowledged her early, significant contributions to neurophysiology, particularly in understanding the mechanisms that underpin brain function during development.

In 2006, she received the FENS Excellence Grant from the Federation of European Neuroscience Societies. This grant acknowledged her significant research contributions to the understanding of the development of neuronal networks, specifically her work on the cellular interactions and functional communications critical for the development and maturation of prefrontal-hippocampal networks essential for mnemonic abilities.

The Du Bois-Reymond Award was conferred upon Hanganu-Opatz in 2008 by the German Society of Physiology. This award recognized her outstanding and independent scientific achievements in physiology, particularly her research contributions to electrophysiology and its relevance to neurological disorders.

In 2014, Hanganu-Opatz became a member of the FENS-Kavli Network of Excellence. This membership is awarded to neuroscientists who have made significant contributions to the field and are deemed to have the potential for future excellence in neuroscience research.

The ERC Consolidator Grant from the European Research Council was awarded to her in 2015. This grant supported her ambitious research on the development and function of neuronal networks, specifically focusing on how early network oscillations contribute to the development of cognitive behaviors and the mechanics underlying neuropsychiatric disorders. This grant is aimed at supporting groundbreaking research on cellular substrate of abnormal network maturation in neuropsychiatric disorders.

In 2024, Hanganu-Opatz received the Adolf Fick Prize, awarded every three years by the German Physiological Society and the Physico-Medical Society of Würzburg for outstanding research in physiology or related fields. The prize, described by the German Physiological Society as the most prestigious physiology award in the German-speaking world, includes the Adolf Fick Medal and €10,000 in prize money.

== Selected publications ==
- Dupont, Erwan; Hanganu, Ileana L.; Kilb, Werner; Hirsch, Silke; Luhmann, Heiko J. (January 2006). "Rapid developmental switch in the mechanisms driving early cortical columnar networks". Nature. 439 (7072): 79–83. Bibcode:2006Natur.439...79D. doi:10.1038/nature04264. PMID 16327778.
- Hanganu, I. L.; Ben-Ari, Y.; Khazipov, R. (21 June 2006). "Retinal Waves Trigger Spindle Bursts in the Neonatal Rat Visual Cortex". Journal of Neuroscience. 26 (25): 6728–6736. doi:10.1523/JNEUROSCI.0752-06.2006. PMC 6673818. PMID 16793880.
- Yang, J.-W.; Hanganu-Opatz, I. L.; Sun, J.-J.; Luhmann, H. J. (15 July 2009). "Three Patterns of Oscillatory Activity Differentially Synchronize Developing Neocortical Networks In Vivo". Journal of Neuroscience. 29 (28): 9011–9025. doi:10.1523/JNEUROSCI.5646-08.2009. PMC 6665441. PMID 19605639.
- Brockmann, Marco D.; Pöschel, Beatrice; Cichon, Nicole; Hanganu-Opatz, Ileana L. (July 2011). "Coupled Oscillations Mediate Directed Interactions between Prefrontal Cortex and Hippocampus of the Neonatal Rat". Neuron. 71 (2): 332–347. doi:10.1016/j.neuron.2011.05.041. PMID 21791291.
