= Brigitta Stockinger =

Gitta Stockinger
- Born: Brigitta Stockinger
- Education: University of Mainz (PhD)
- Awards: FMedSci (2005); FRS (2013); EMBO member (2008)
- Scientific career
- Fields: Immunology; T helper 17 cells; effector T cell development; inflammation; autoimmunity; environmental influences on immunity
- Workplaces: National Institute for Medical Research; University of London; University of Cambridge; Cancer Research Institute in Heidelberg
- Website: nimr.mrc.ac.uk/research/gitta-stockinger

Brigitta Stockinger is a molecular immunologist in the Francis Crick Institute in London. Stockinger's lab focus on understanding how certain immune cells, called T cells, develop and function as well as investigating how diet and other environmental factors can affect the way the immune system works.

Stockinger focuses on a particular type of immune cell that helps to control immune responses to viruses, bacteria and other pathogens, called a CD4 T cell.

Stockinger's research has provided insights into a particular type of CD4 T cell, called a Th17 cell, looking at why some of these cells become inflammatory and cause damage in the body. Her lab identified a particular receptor, the aryl hydrocarbon receptor (AhR), which connects environmental stimuli and the immune system.

== Education ==
Stockinger was educated at the University of Mainz, where she was awarded a PhD in Biology. She then did postdoctoral studies in London, Cambridge and at the Cancer Research Institute in Heidelberg.

== Career ==
- 1985 - 1991 – Basel Institute for Immunology (Member)
- 1991 - 2015 – Division of Molecular Immunology (now part of the Francis Crick Institute), MRC National Institute for Medical Research (Head)
- 2015–present – Principal Investigator in the Francis Crick Institute. Stockinger joined the Institute's scientific leadership team as an Associate Research Director in July 2020.

== Awards and honours ==
Stockinger was elected a Fellow of the Royal Society in 2013. Her nomination reads:

Brigitta Stockinger has contributed insights regulation and maintenance of peripheral T cell immune responses. She was the first to define mechanisms underlying the differentiation of Th17 cells and demonstrated substantial pasticity in TH17 cell function depending on the inflammatory environment. Stockinger identified the Aryl hydrocarbon receptor (AhR) as connector between the immune system and environmental stimuli, showing that it shapes the functional differentiation of Th17 effector cells. The AhR links their role in host defence as well as their role in autoimmunity to environmental factors. Research into the physiological roles of AhR in the immune system beyond its role in toxicology provides a major breakthrough for both disciplines.

In 2008, she was elected a member of European Molecular Biology Organization (EMBO). She is also a fellow of the Academy of Medical Sciences.
