= Gerhard Braunitzer =

German biochemist

Gerhard Braunitzer (24 September 1921 – 27 May 1989) was a German biochemist who was a pioneer in protein sequencing. He refined a method of C-terminal analysis that was used in early sequencing work, and he generated the first full sequence of a hemoglobin chain (β-hemoglobin). He worked at the Max Planck Institute of Biochemistry. Later in his career he was a significant researcher in the field of molecular evolution.
