= Center for Molecular Neurobiology Hamburg =

Molecular neuroscience research center

Coordinates: 53°35′12″N 9°58′16″E

The Center for Molecular Neurobiology Hamburg (ZMNH), founded in 1988, is an internationally recognized molecular neuroscience research center, part of the University Medical Center Hamburg-Eppendorf (UKE), Germany. Headed by Manuel Friese, the ZMNH is currently home to 190 scientists and staff from 20 countries (2026).

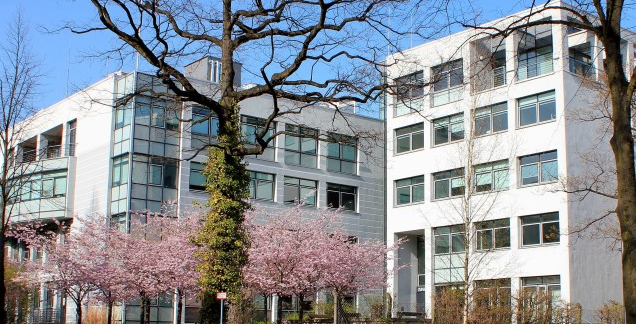

== Research ==
The focus of the ZMNH is basic research in neurobiology and neuroimmunology, combining molecular genetics with anatomical, biochemical and physiological approaches. The ZMNH is structured into seven departments and several independent research groups.

Departments/Institutes

- Medical Systems Bioinformatics (Stefan Bonn)
- Neuroimmunology and Multiple Sclerosis (Manuel A. Friese)
- Developmental Neuroscience Ileana Hanganu-Opatz
- Molecular Neurogenetics (Matthias Kneussel)
- Synaptic Neuroscience (Thomas G. Oertner)
- Neural Information Processing (Stefano Panzeri)
- Systems Immunology (Immo Prinz)

Independent Research Groups

- Molecular Neurooncology (Julia Neumann)
- Synaptic Proteostasis (Katarzyna Grochowska)
- Neural Circuit Physiology (Sebastian Bitzenhofer)
- Behavioral Biology Unit (Fabio Morellini)
- RNA based Pathomechanisms of the Central Nervous System (Andreas Neueder)

Guest Groups

- Dendritic Organelles and Synaptic Function (Michael Kreutz)
- Fraunhofer IME ScreeningPort (Ole Pless)

Research is supported by in-house facilities for morphology and ultrastructure, transgenic animals, machine shop, IT department, and administration

== Major discoveries ==
Several proteins that are key to synaptic function were first cloned and characterized at the ZMNH, for example the presynaptic proteins Piccolo (PCLO) and Bassoon and the major organizer of the postsynaptic density, PSD-95 (a.k.a. SAP90). Synaptic activity controls the activity of certain genes, the so-called immediate early genes. Arg3.1/Arc, a prominent example of this gene family, was discovered at the ZMNH and found to have important functions in learning and memory.

An early focus of the center was understanding the structure and function of ion channels. The famous 'ball-and-chain' mechanism of potassium channel inactivation was discovered at the ZMNH. A number of human diseases (hereditary forms of myotonia, osteopetrosis, retinal degeneration, kidney stone diseases, epilepsy, deafness) could be mapped to mutations in specific ion channels. These fundamental insights allowed researchers to mimic important aspects of human diseases in genetically accurate animal models, a key step in the development of new drugs.

More recently, ZMNH researchers developed novel genetic tools to control neuronal activity with light (optogenetics), including the first light-gated chloride channel ChloC and the light-activated potassium channel PACK.
