= University Medical Center Hamburg-Eppendorf =

Universitätsklinikum University Medical Center Hamburg-Eppendorf

Geography
- Location: Martinistraße 52; 20246 Hamburg, Germany
- Coordinates: 53°35′29″N 9°58′36″E

Organisation
- Care system: Statutory health insurance (GKV), Private
- Type: university hospital
- Affiliated university: University of Hamburg

Services
- Standards: ISO 9001, ISO 14001
- Emergency department: Yes
- Beds: 1,738 (plus 220 at the University Cardiology Center, 68 at the old Martini-Klinik and 72 at the new Martini-Klinik)

Helipads
- Helipad: Yes

History
- Founded: 19 May 1889

Links
- Website: www.uke.de
- Lists: Hospitals in Germany

The University Medical Center Hamburg-Eppendorf (German: Universitätsklinikum Hamburg-Eppendorf, UKE) is the teaching hospital of the University of Hamburg and the largest hospital in Hamburg, Germany.

The UKE has 1,738 beds and 121 day-care places and is listed to provide the capacity to dispatch emergency medical services.

== Research & Training ==
Research at the UKE is focused on 5 major areas. This increasing scientific focus is supported by the Faculty of Medicine and is reflected in the research centers and joint projects at national and European level:

1. Neuroscience (Hamburg Center for Neuroscience, HCNS)
2. Inflammation, infection and immunity (C3i)
3. Oncology research (University Cancer Center Hamburg, UCCH)
4. Cardiovascular research (Cardiovascular Research Center, CVRC)
5. Health care research and public health

The next generation of biomedical researchers is trained in the structured training program 'UKE Academy of Biomedical and Health Sciences', consisting of the following graduate schools:

- Hamburg Brain School (HBS)
- Hamburg School of Infection & Immunity (HSII)
- Hamburg School of Oncology
- Hamburg Cardiovascular School
- Hamburg School of Health Sciences

== History ==
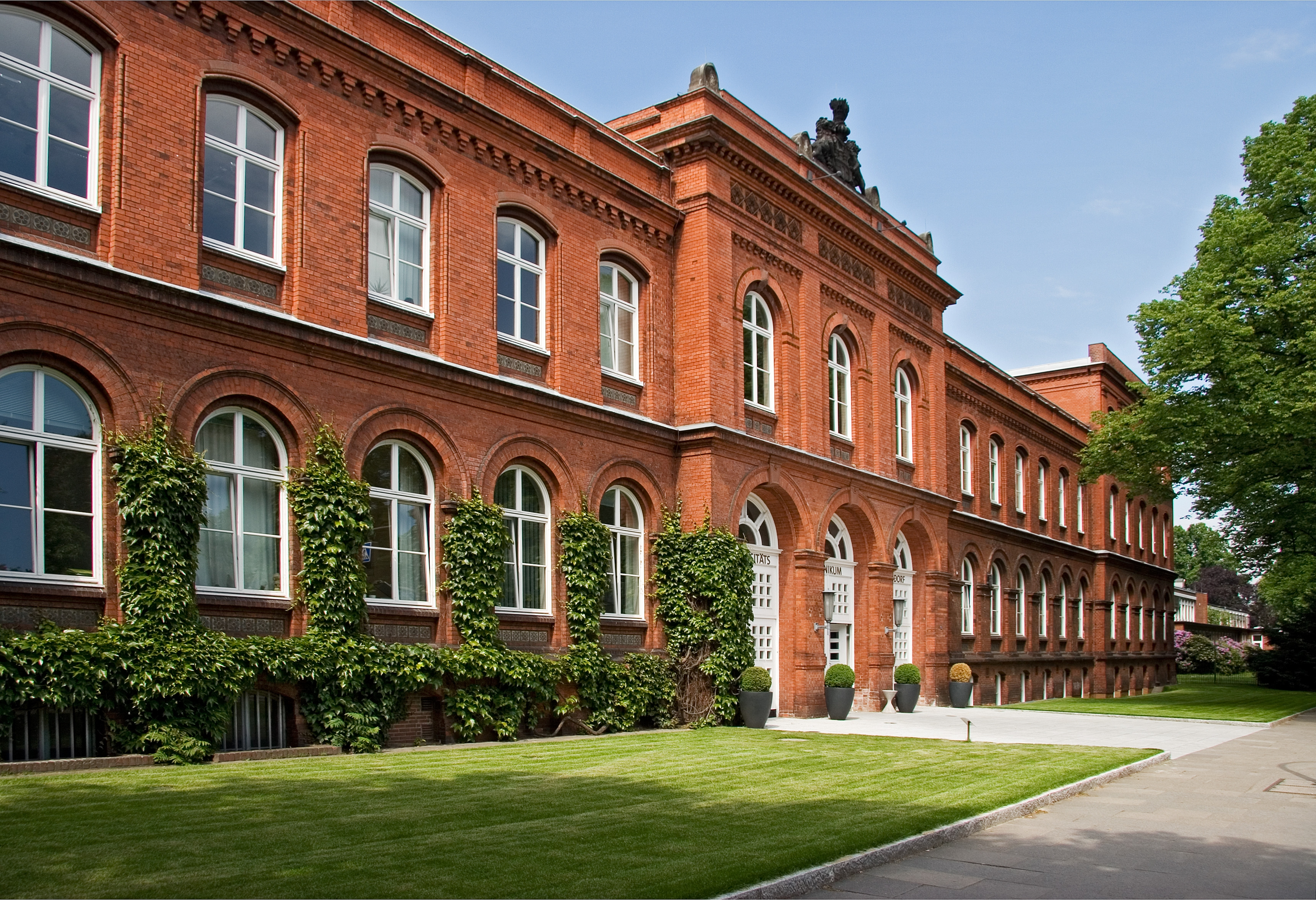
UKE's former main entrance

The first parts of the hospital were built between 1884 and 1889. From 1913 until 1926, Fritz Schumacher built a general purpose building, today called Fritz-Schumacher-Haus, among others for the pathological anatomy with a dissecting room. Only in 1934 it was named "University Hospital". In 2008 the hospital participated in the Tag des offenen Denkmals, a Germany-wide annual event sponsored by the Deutsche Stiftung Denkmalschutz, that opens cultural heritage sites to the public—showing the Fritz-Schumacher-Haus and the operating theatre in a bunker from World War II.

In 2011, the hospital achieved Stage 7 of the Healthcare Information and Management Systems Society Analytics Europe's Electronic Medical Record Adoption Model. This was awarded for achieving a paperless medical record environment coupled with significant computerised analysis of clinical data.

== Location ==
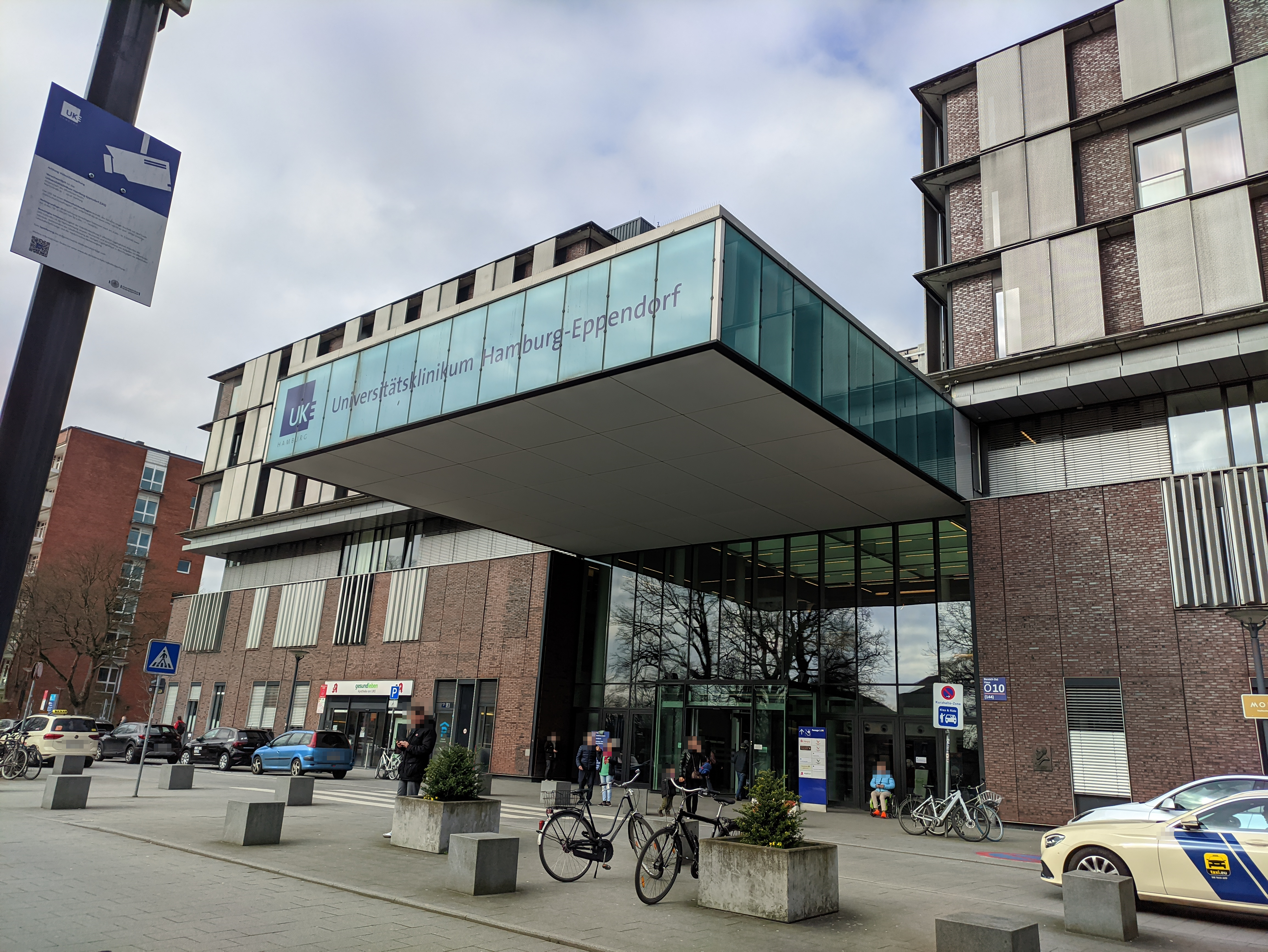
UKE's main entrance since 2009

The hospital is located in Eppendorf, Hamburg, between Martinistraße and Geschwister-Scholl-Straße, and between the ground of SC Victoria in Hoheluft and the Krankenhaus Bethanien, a hospital which was built in 1893.

== Board ==
The board consists of Prof. Dr. med. Christian Gerloff, Medical Director and Chairman, Corinna Wriedt, Commercial Director, Joachim Prölß, Director of patients and care management and the Dean of the Faculty of Medicine, Prof. Dr. Blanche Schwappach-Pignataro.

== See also ==
- Heinrich Pette Institute
- Center for Molecular Neurobiology Hamburg
- Bernhard Nocht Institute for Tropical Medicine
- Education in Hamburg

== Notes ==
=== References ===
- Hospitals in Hamburg 2012, Government Agency for Health and Consumer Protection of Hamburg website (in German)
