= Max Planck Institute of Molecular Physiology =

Molecular physiology institute in Dortmund, Germany

Coordinates: 51°29′22″N 07°24′35″E

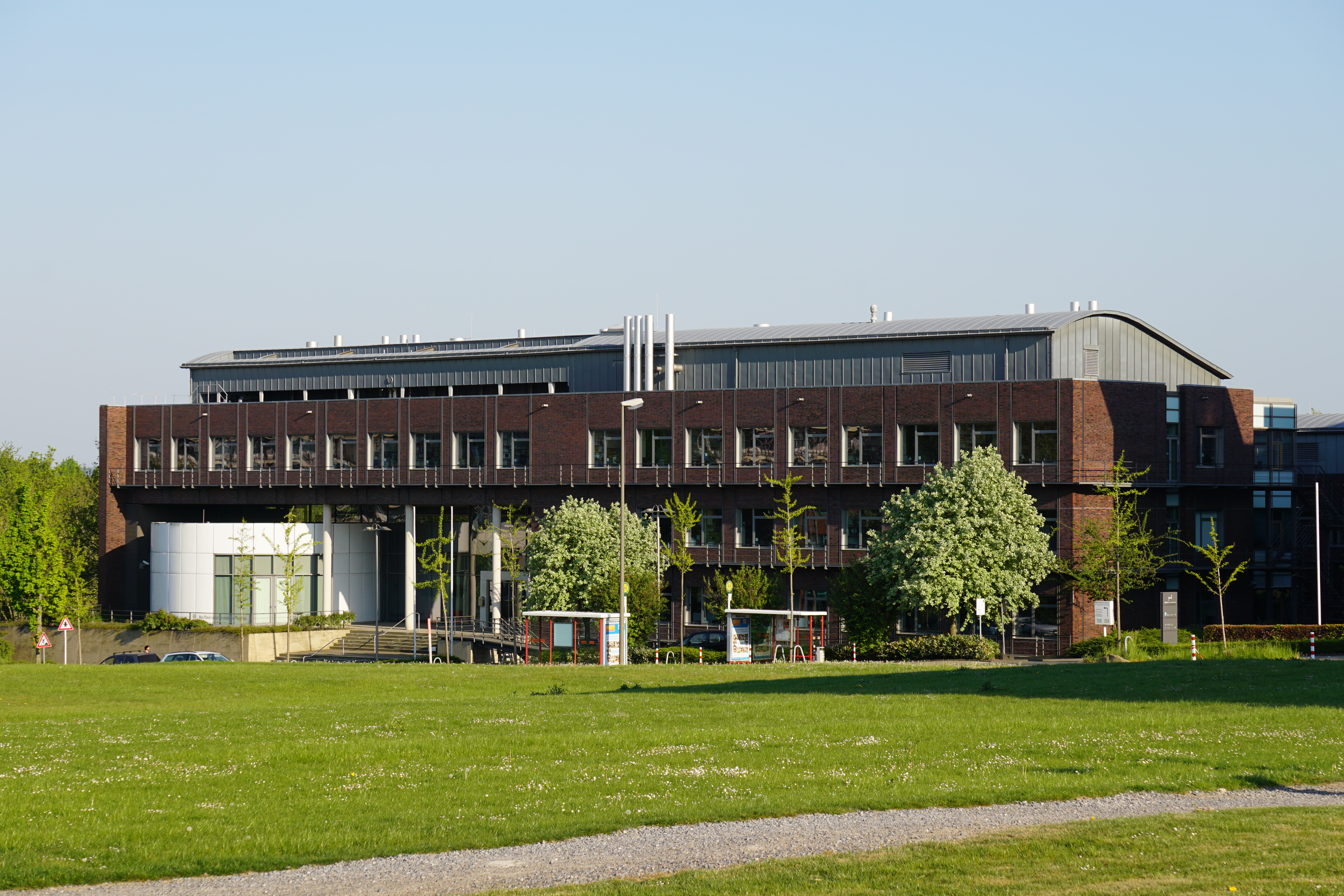
- Abbreviation: MPI MOPH
- Type: Scientific institute
- Purpose: Basic research
- Headquarters: Max Planck Society, Munich
- Location: Dortmund, North Rhine-Westphalia, Germany
- Methods: Cell biology, Systems biology, Structural biology, Chemical biology
- Parent organization: Max Planck Society
- Staff: approx. 500
- Website: www.mpi-dortmund.mpg.de

The Max Planck Institute of Molecular Physiology (German: Max-Planck-Institut für molekulare Physiologie) is located in Dortmund, next to the Technical University of Dortmund. It is one of 80 institutes in the Max Planck Society (Max Planck Gesellschaft).

== Origins ==
The Institute was originally founded by Max Rubner as the Kaiser-Wilhelm Institut für Arbeitsphysiologie, part of the Kaiser Wilhelm Institute in 1913. During the First World War the Institute focussed on nutrition and diet, and how ersatz substitutes could be found for particular foodstuffs which were becoming scarce. They worked alongside the Kriegsernährungsamt (War Nutrition Office) to try out different food surrogates both for the military and the civilian population. They also developed aptitude tests for different types of work, such as evaluating distance perception for military drivers, pilots and railway workers. This was further developed to provide a means for selecting artillery officers.

== Departments ==
=== Mechanistic Cell Biology ===
The Department of Mechanistic Cell Biology (Director: Andrea Musacchio) aims to better understand the molecular mechanisms of cell division and their regulation. The main focus is on the key proteins that control the division of chromosomes during mitosis, a process that separates sister chromatids into two identical daughter cells, thereby maintaining chromosome stability.

=== Systemic Cell Biology ===
The Department of Systemic Cell Biology (Director: Philippe Bastiaens) studies the regulation of signal transduction processes in cells. These processes control significant cellular functions such as tissue growth (proliferation) or the differentiation of cells into specialized cell types and, thus, determine the fate of each cell.

=== Structural Biochemistry ===
The Department of Structural Biochemistry (Director: Stefan Raunser) focuses on structural and functional analyses of biologically and medically relevant membrane proteins and macromolecular complexes. Special attention is given to the investigation into the molecular mechanisms of muscle contraction and the infection with bacterial toxins. Furthermore, membrane proteins that play an important role in the synthesis, transport, and homeostasis of cholesterol in the body are examined.

=== Chemical Biology ===
Research in the Department of Chemical Biology (Director: Herbert Waldmann) concentrates on the interface between organic chemistry and biology. By using biochemical and chemical techniques, researchers identify and develop new tools for the investigation of biologically relevant processes and phenomena.
