= Max Planck Institute for Medical Research =

Medical institute in Heidelberg, Germany

- Max-Planck-Institut für medizinische Forschung
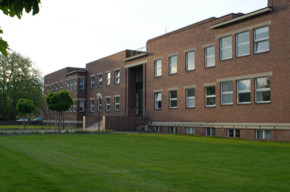
- Abbreviation: MPImF
- Headquarters: Munich, Germany
- Location: Heidelberg, Germany
- Acting Director: Kai Johnsson
- Parent organization: Max Planck Society
- Staff: approx. 250

The Max Planck Institute for Medical Research in Heidelberg, Germany, is a facility of the Max Planck Society for basic medical research. Since its foundation, six Nobel Prize laureates worked at the Institute: Otto Fritz Meyerhof (Physiology), Richard Kuhn (Chemistry), Walther Bothe (Physics), André Michel Lwoff (Physiology or Medicine), Rudolf Mößbauer (Physics), Bert Sakmann (Physiology or Medicine) and Stefan W. Hell (Chemistry).

== History ==
The institute was founded in 1927 by Ludolf von Krehl as the Kaiser Wilhelm Institute for Medical Research, opened in 1930, and re-founded as a Max Planck Institute in 1948. Its original goal was to apply the methods of Physics and Chemistry to basic medical research, e.g. radiation therapy for cancer treatment, and it included departments of Chemistry, Physiology, and Biophysics. In the 1960s, new developments in biology were reflected with the establishment of the Department of Molecular Biology. Toward the end of the 1980s and during the 1990s, investigations began into the specific functions of muscle and nerve cells. New departments were established in Cell Physiology (1989–2008), Molecular Cell Research (1992–1999), Molecular Neurobiology (1995), Biomedical Optics (1999) and Biomolecular Mechanisms (2002). The independent junior research groups for Ion Channel Structure (1997–2003) and Developmental Genetics of the Nervous System (1999–2005) were also founded.

== The present ==
The institute currently has four departments: Biomolecular Mechanisms (Ilme Schlichting), Chemical Biology (Kai Johnsson), Cellular Biophysics (Joachim Spatz) and Optical Nanoscopy (Stefan W. Hell). With the appointment of three new directors in the last few years, the institute has experienced a major reorientation. The new, central topic of research is to observe in real time and manipulate the complex dynamics of the interactions between macromolecules in the living cell, in health and disease. The four departments work in complementary areas: the determination of atomic structures (Ilme Schlichting), optical nanoscopy (Stefan Hell), design of new reporter molecules (Kai Johnson) and cellular material research and biophysics (Joachim Spatz). This institute-wide project involves developing tools for biomedical research.

== Departments ==
=== Biomolecular Mechanisms ===
In the general excitement of a time when three-dimensional protein structures of whole genomes are being determined automatically, it is often forgotten that a structure in itself does not tell one how the molecule works or folds.

=== Chemical Biology ===
The Department of Chemical Biology focusses on the visualization and manipulation of biological activities in live cells. The in vivo localization and quantification of protein activities, metabolites and other important parameters has become a central quest in biology, but the majority of cellular processes remain invisible, to date.

=== Cellular Biophysics ===
The primary scientific goal of the department is to develop technologies, based on physics, chemistry and materials science, for unraveling fundamental problems in cellular science, biomedical science and the engineering of life-like materials. For example, the department fundamentally investigates the organization and decision-making processes of cell collectives and organoids as well as the assembly and function of synthetic cells, designer immune cells and tissues.

=== Optical Nanoscopy ===
The Department of Optical Nanoscopy is focused on conceiving, exploring, validating and applying optical microscopy methods with resolution far beyond the classical diffraction limit. The primary scientific direction of this new department is to push the performance of nano-optical molecular analysis in (living) cells and tissues.

== Research and working groups ==
In May 2023, there were 9 research groups:

- Group Thomas Barends (Nitrogen biology)
- Group R. Bruce Doak (structural biology)
- Group Tatiana Domratcheva (Computational Photobiology)
- Group Matthias Fischer (Viruses of protists)
- Group Inaam Nakchbandi (matrix and extracellular matrix receptors in disease)
- Group Jochen Reinstein (virus capsids)
- Group Rolf Sprengel (molecular neurobiology)
- Group Kerstin Göpfrich (bioengineering)

== Emeritus groups ==
=== Emeritus Group Biophysics ===
The Emeritus Group on Biophysics (led by Prof. Dr. Kenneth C. Holmes) focuses on structures of actin and myosin at atomic resolution.

== Facilities ==
=== Light Microscopy ===
The Light microscopy Facility of the Max Planck Institute for Medical Research aims to provide Institute members and guests "low threshold" access to sophisticated microscopy and data analysis equipment, to provide support and training related to sample preparation, data recording and analysis and to stimulate communication and exchange of experience.

=== Library ===
The library of the Max Planck Institute for Medical Research is a reference library containing specialized scientific literature. It serves teaching and research in the fields of life sciences, chemistry, biology and physics. The opening time for external users are from Monday to Friday:

- 09:00 am to 12:00 am
- 02:00 pm to 04:00 pm

For members of the institute, it is open 24 hours a day.

== Research schools (IMPRS) ==
=== IMPRS for Quantum Dynamics in Physics, Chemistry and Biology ===
The IMPRS for Quantum Dynamics in Physics, Chemistry and Biology is a joint initiative of the Max Planck Institute for Nuclear Physics, Ruprecht Karls University, the German Cancer Research Center, the Max Planck Institute for Medical Research (all in Heidelberg), and the Heavy Ion Research Center (GSI) in Darmstadt.

== Geotag/Coordinates ==
Coordinates for the Max Planck Institute for Medical Research in Heidelberg: 49°24′43.76″N 8°40′31.91″E
