= Yo-El Ju =

South Korean neurologist (born 1979)

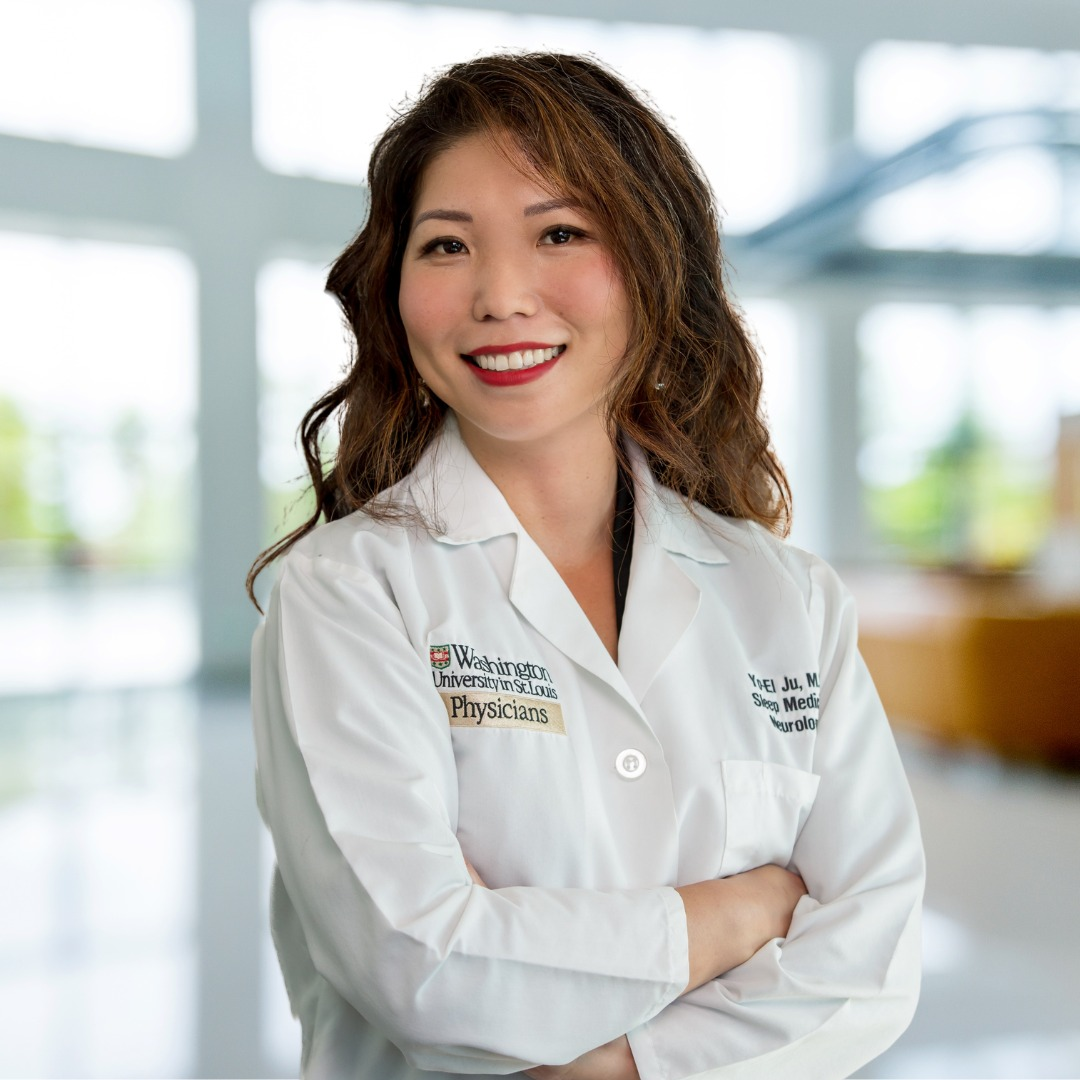
- Born: South Korea
- Education: Harvard College (B.A.), Columbia University Vagelos College of Physicians and Surgeons (M.D.)
- Scientific career
- Fields: Sleep medicine, neurology
- Workplaces: Washington University in St. Louis
- Website: https://sites.wustl.edu/yoelju/, http://yoelju.com

Yo-El Ju is the Barbara Burton and Reuben Morriss III Professor of Neurology at the Washington University School of Medicine. She co-directs the Center on Biological Rhythms and Sleep (COBRAS) and is a member of the Hope Center for Neurological Diseases at Washington University. Clinically, she sees patients at Barnes-Jewish Hospital for parasomnia, narcolepsy, restless legs syndrome, and obstructive sleep apnea. Ju's team has made contributions to the field of sleep medicine and neurology on the relationship between sleep, amyloid deposition and neurodegenerative diseases such as Alzheimer's. As of April 2023, the most cited work from her lab is their 2017 paper in Brain: A Journal of Neurology that showed cerebrospinal fluid (CSF) amyloid-beta protein level increases due to slow-wave sleep disruption.

== Early life and education ==
Ju was born in 1979 in South Korea. She attended Rift Valley Academy in Kijabe, Kenya for high school and later transferred to Fairfax High School in Los Angeles, U.S. She attended Harvard College for her undergraduate studies, graduating Magna Cum Laude in 2001 with a B.A. in biology. While studying at Harvard, she received the John Harvard College Scholarship (awarded to top 5% of class) and conducted research in neuronal cell biology and tissue engineering in the lab of Paul Janmey and Thomas Stossel under the mentorship of Lisa A. Flanagan.

Ju went on to obtain her M.D. in 2005 from Columbia University Vagelos College of Physicians and Surgeons, where she was a member of Alpha Omega Alpha, a national medical honor society, and won the Glasgow-Rubin Achievement Award for women graduating in the top 10% of their class. After graduating from medical school, Ju moved to Washington University in St. Louis, completing a residency in neurology in 2009. After this, Ju went on to specialize in sleep medicine, completing clinical and research fellowships in the discipline of the Washington University Multidisciplinary Sleep Medicine Center from 2009 to 2011, where she examined the relationship between Alzheimer's disease and circadian rhythms. During this period, Ju also studied rapid eye movement sleep behavior disorder. Ju obtained her M.S. in Clinical Investigation from Washington University in St. Louis in 2015.

== Scientific career ==
Ju started working as an Assistant Professor in the Department of Neurology at Washington University School of Medicine in 2011 and is currently the Barbara Burton and Reuben Morriss III Professor of Neurology. The Yo-El Ju Lab studies sleep and neurodegenerative diseases, focusing on two areas: sleep and Alzheimer's disease, and REM sleep behavior disorder and its relationship to synucleinopathies such as Parkinson's disease. The lab's projects include studying the effect of slow-wave sleep on amyloid-beta dynamics; REM sleep behavior disorder; sleep and circadian rhythms in Alzheimer's disease; as well as biomarkers of Alzheimer's disease in sleep and electroencephalography (EEG).

In May 2013, a team including Ju and her mentor David Holtzman showed that sleep quality, but not necessarily sleep quantity, is associated with amyloid deposition in preclinical Alzheimer's disease, publishing their findings in JAMA Neurology. This study was critical in identifying a greater temporal window for key clinical interventions to be made to address sleep abnormalities because it was the first to show that changes in sleep are associated with Alzheimer's disease brain changes prior to symptom onset (in preclinical disease). It also identified an unexpected trend toward increased time in bed and amyloid deposition. These findings relate to a number of subsequent influential findings, including that sleep consolidation, or reducing the time in bed to match the time asleep, can attenuate the effects of the apolipoprotein E ε4 genotype on the development of incident Alzheimer's Disease. Many Alzheimer's interventions involve regulating other aspects of patients' sleep as well.

In addition to her 2013 finding on sleep quality being associated with amyloid deposition, Ju also highlighted how it may be the case that sleep and Alzheimer's biomarkers influence each other in a bidirectional relationship: the sleep-wake cycle influences amyloid deposition in the brain, but amyloid-beta deposition may also lead to altered sleep-wake patterns. In 2014, Ju published a review paper in Nature Reviews Neurology that underscored how neurodegenerative diseases and sleep may influence each other in a bidirectional relationship, and how that may have important implications for how Alzheimer's disease is diagnosed and treated. This has important implications for how individuals with obstructive sleep apnea and other sleep problems should be treated to reduce their risk of developing dementia and how measures of sleep quality may be treated as preclinical markers of Alzheimer's disease.

In 2016, Ju's team published a paper in Annals of Neurology showing that CSF levels of amyloid-beta are decreased in obstructive sleep apnea patients, despite the finding that these patients had lower slow wave activity, a sign of a lull in cortical neuron synaptic activity. This finding was unexpected because slow wave activity is negatively correlated with CSF amyloid beta levels in individuals without obstructive sleep apnea (the opposite of what was observed in individuals with obstructive sleep apnea), and because its findings questioned previous findings of increased intracellular amyloid-beta in obstructive sleep apnea. Importantly, this study identified key shortcomings in previously proposed model mechanisms used to explain the field's previous understanding of an association between obstructive sleep apnea and Alzheimer's Disease. Ju and colleagues proposed an alternative mechanism that draws upon CSF pulsatility and respiration-driven CSF bulk flow, specifically hypothesizing that obstructive episodes during obstructive sleep apnea result in elevated intrathoracic and intracranial pressure, the latter of which may impede the flow of metabolites like amyloid beta from the brain interstitial space into the CSF. This has broadened the interests of researchers to reconsider the magnitude of the role hypoxia and sleep fragmentation play in neurodegeneration and cognitive decline in individuals with obstructive sleep apnea, and to also consider downstream effects of apneic episodes on metabolite build-up, inflammation, and cerebrovascular changes as part of the causal pathway.

Later on, in 2017, Ju led a study published in Brain: A Journal of Neurology that found CSF amyloid-beta protein level increases as a result of slow-wave sleep deprivation. This finding was particularly significant because while researchers had previously known that sleep deprivation increases amyloid-beta levels, and that sleep disorders are associated with Alzheimer's disease pathology, sleep is a heterogenous state and the specific aspects of sleep associated with neurodegeneration had not been examined. This finding opened the field for future studies that specifically target preservation or enhancement of slow-wave sleep to prevent amyloid-beta deposition in Alzheimer's disease pathology. Subsequent studies have supported this finding and provided additional evidence for slow wave activity to be inversely related to tau pathology in addition to amyloid-beta.

Ju was the senior author on a 2018 paper in JAMA Neurology studying how circadian rhythms are disturbed in preclinical Alzheimer's disease. After measuring circadian rhythms using wrist actigraphy data and Alzheimer's disease pathology using Pittsburgh-Compound B (PiB) amyloid imaging and CSF phosphorylated-tau as biomarkers, Ju and colleagues found that there is rest-activity circadian rhythm fragmentation in individuals with preclinical Alzheimer's disease, and that circadian dysfunction occurs in older individuals independent of preclinical Alzheimer's disease pathology. These findings further highlight the association between Alzheimer's disease and the body's biological clock, in addition to underlining a need for 24-hour care for Alzheimer's patients, and have been supported by subsequent research. In addition, they have opened many lines of investigation into how changes in circadian rhythms differ between normal aging and neurodegeneration, the molecular mechanisms of circadian rhythm changes, and the directionality of the role of amyloid beta in circadian rhythm fragmentation.

Ju collaborates with Washington University colleagues in studying sleep/circadian function and Alzheimer's disease, including David Holtzman, Erik Musiek, and Brendan P. Lucey, among others.

Currently, Ju's research interests include using electroencephalography to predict Alzheimer's disease and evaluating the relationship between circadian rhythm dysfunction and tau protein deposition in the brain.

She is also studying REM sleep behavior disorder, a sleep disorder that in many cases precedes a diagnosis of Parkinson's disease, dementia with Lewy bodies, or multiple system atrophy—together called synucleinopathies.

== Personal life ==
Ju currently lives in St. Louis, Missouri. She married in 2006 and divorced in 2022. She is the mother of two children, born in 2014 and 2017.

== Memberships and certifications ==
Ju holds memberships in the American Academy of Sleep Medicine, the American Academy of Neurology, the American Neurological Association, for which she has served as the co-chair of the Sleep and Clocks Special Interest Group from 2019 to 2021, and the International REM Sleep Behavior Disorder Study Group, for which she has served as executive board from 2015 to 2019 and secretary from 2017 to 2019. Ju is board certified in neurology and sleep medicine by the American Board of Psychiatry and Neurology.

== Awards and grants ==
Ju has won multiple NIH grants, including a roughly 35 million dollar grant to the North American Prodromal Synucleinopathy (NAPS) Consortium where she is the principal investigator together with Bradley Boeve and Ronald Postuma. Ju was ranked the 14th highest NIH-funded investigator in neurology in 2022. Additionally, Ju has won multiple prestigious awards for her research, including the American Academy of Sleep Medicine Parasomnia Section Investigator Award in 2010, the World Association of Sleep Medicine Young Investigator Award in 2013, and the American Academy of Neurology Wayne Hening Sleep Medicine Investigator Award in 2018.

== Selected publications ==
- Ju, Yo-El S.; Lucey, Brendan P.; Holtzman, David M. (December 24, 2013). "Sleep and Alzheimer disease pathology—a bidirectional relationship". Nature Reviews. Neurology. 10 (2): 115–119. doi:10.1038/nrneurol.2013.269. ISSN 1759-4766. PMC 3979317. PMID 24366271.
- Ju, Yo-El S.; McLeland, Jennifer S.; Toedebusch, Cristina D.; Xiong, Chengjie; Fagan, Anne M.; Duntley, Stephen P.; Morris, John C.; Holtzman, David M. (May 1, 2013). "Sleep quality and preclinical Alzheimer disease". JAMA Neurology. 70 (5): 587–593. doi:10.1001/jamaneurol.2013.2334. ISSN 2168-6157. PMC 3676720. PMID 23479184.
- Ju, Yo-El S.; Ooms, Sharon J.; Sutphen, Courtney; Macauley, Shannon L.; Zangrilli, Margaret A.; Jerome, Gina; Fagan, Anne M.; Mignot, Emmanuel; Zempel, John M.; Claassen, Jurgen A. H. R.; Holtzman, David M. (August 1, 2017). "Slow wave sleep disruption increases cerebrospinal fluid amyloid-β levels". Brain: A Journal of Neurology. 140 (8): 2104–2111. doi:10.1093/brain/awx148. ISSN 1460-2156. PMC 5790144. PMID 28899014.
- Ju, Yo-El S.; Finn, Mary Beth; Sutphen, Courtney L.; Herries, Elizabeth M.; Jerome, Gina M.; Ladenson, Jack H.; Crimmins, Daniel L.; Fagan, Anne M.; Holtzman, David M. (June 1, 2016). "Obstructive sleep apnea decreases central nervous system-derived proteins in the cerebrospinal fluid". Annals of Neurology. 80 (1): 154–159. doi:10.1002/ana.24672. ISSN 1531-8249. PMC 5120585. PMID 27129429.
- Ju, Yo-El; Janmey, Paul A.; McCormick, Margaret E.; Sawyer, Evelyn S.; Flanagan, Lisa A. (April 1, 2007). "Enhanced neurite growth from mammalian neurons in three-dimensional salmon fibrin gels". Biomaterials. 28 (12): 2097–2108. doi:10.1016/j.biomaterials.2007.01.008. ISSN 0142-9612. PMC 1991290. PMID 17258313.
- Ju, Yo-El; Larson-Prior, Linda; Duntley, Stephen (February 12, 2011). "Changing demographics in REM sleep behavior disorder: possible effect of autoimmunity and antidepressants". Sleep Medicine. 12 (3): 278–283. doi:10.1016/j.sleep.2010.07.022. ISSN 1878-5506. PMID 21317035.
- Videnovic, Aleksandar; Ju, Yo-El S.; Arnulf, Isabelle; Cochen-De Cock, Valérie; Högl, Birgit; Kunz, Dieter; Provini, Federica; Ratti, Pietro-Luca; Schiess, Mya C.; Schenck, Carlos H.; Trenkwalder, Claudia; Treatment and Trials Working Group of the International RBD Study Group (May 13, 2020). "Clinical trials in REM sleep behavioural disorder: challenges and opportunities". Journal of Neurology, Neurosurgery, and Psychiatry. 91 (7): 740–749. doi:10.1136/jnnp-2020-322875. ISSN 1468-330X. PMC 7735522. PMID 32404379.
