= David Bennett (neurologist) =

Neurologist

David A Bennett is a neurologist, Director of the Rush Alzheimer's Disease Center (RADC), and the Robert C Borwell Professor of Neurology at Rush University Medical Center. Bennett is also visiting professor, Instituto de Assistência Médica ao Servidor Público Estadual (IAMSPE), São Paulo, Brazil.

Bennett was the recipient of the 2018 Potamkin Prize for Research in Pick's, Alzheimer's, and Related Diseases "in recognition of methods he developed with colleagues to measure de novo synthesis of amyloid-beta (Abeta)."

Bennett is the principal investigator of the National Institute on Aging (NIA) funded Religious Orders Study (ROS) and the Rush Memory and Aging Project (MAP). Biospecimens and data from ROS and MAP are used as part of the NIH funded Accelerating Medicines Partnership for Alzheimer's Disease (AMP-AD). He also leads the Pathology Alzheimer's and Related Dementias Study (PARDoS) in the state of São Paulo Brazil.

== Selected publications ==
- Wilson RS, Mendes de Leon CF, Barnes LL, Schneider JA, Bienias JL, Evans DA, Bennett DA (2002). "Participation in cognitively stimulating activities and risk of incident Alzheimer's disease". JAMA. 287 (6): 742–748. doi:10.1001/jama.287.6.742. PMID 11851541.
- Bennett DA, Schneider JA, Arvanitakis Z, Kelly JF, Aggarwal NT, Shah R, Wilson RS (2006). "Neuropathology of older persons without cognitive impairment selectedfrom two community-based studies". Neurology. 66 (12): 1837–1844. doi:10.1212/01.wnl.0000219668.47116.e6. PMID 16801647. S2CID 7490871.
- Bennett DA, Schneider JA, Tang Y, Arnold SE, Wilson RS (2006). "The effect of social networks on the relation between Alzheimer's disease pathology and level of cognitive function in old people: a longitudinal cohort study". Lancet Neurology. 5 (5): 406–412. doi:10.1016/S1474-4422(06)70417-3. PMID 16632311. S2CID 2847280.
- Wilson, R. S.; Boyle, P. A.; Yu, L.; Barnes, L. L.; Schneider, J. A.; Bennett, D. A. (2013). "Life-span cognitive activity, neuropathologic burden, and cognitive aging". Neurology. 81 (4): 314–321. doi:10.1212/WNL.0b013e31829c5e8a. PMC 3772831. PMID 23825173.
- Boyle, Patricia A.; Yu, Lei; Wilson, Robert S.; Leurgans, Sue E.; Schneider, Julie A.; Bennett, David A. (2018). "Person‐specific contribution of neuropathologies to cognitive loss in old age". Annals of Neurology. 83 (1): 74–83. doi:10.1002/ana.25123. PMC 5876116. PMID 29244218.
- Arvanitakis, Zoe; Shah, Raj C; Bennett, David A (2019). "Diagnosis and Management of Dementia: Review". JAMA. 322 (16): 1589–1599. doi:10.1001/jama.2019.4782. PMC 7462122. PMID 31638686.
