= Potamkin Prize =

Award of the American Academy of Neurology

The Potamkin Prize for Research in Pick's, Alzheimer's, and Related Diseases was established in 1988 and is sponsored by the American Academy of Neurology. The prize is funded through the philanthropy of the Potamkin Foundation. The prize is awarded for achievements on emerging areas of research in Pick's disease, Alzheimer's disease and other dementias.

The award includes a medallion, $100,000 prize, and a 20-minute lecture at the American Academy of Neurology annual meeting. The prize is named after Luba Potamkin (wife of Victor Potamkin) who, in 1978, was diagnosed with a form of dementia which was identified as Pick's disease, a form of frontotemporal dementia.

A website dedicated to the Potamkin Prize was launched in 2020 and included background on the prize, biographies of past winners, and information about applying or being nominated.

== Awards ==
Source (to 2017): American Academy of Neurology

- 2025: Gil Rabinovici , William Seeley
- 2024: Francisco Lopera
- 2023: Maria Luisa Gorno-Tempini
- 2021: Vladimir Hachinski
- 2021: Kenneth Kosik, Giovanna Mallucci
- 2020: J. Paul Taylor
- 2019: Randall J. Bateman
- 2018: David Bennett
- 2017: Claudia Kawas, Kristine Yaffe
- 2016: Rosa Rademakers, Bryan J. Traynor
- 2015: Peter Davies, Reisa Sperling
- 2014: Marek-Marsel Mesulam
- 2013: Eric M. Reiman, Michael W. Weiner, William J. Jagust
- 2012: Takeshi Iwatsubo
- 2011: Dennis W. Dickson, Eckhard Mandelkow, Eva-Maria Mandelkow
- 2010: Bruce L. Miller, Lennart Mucke
- 2009: Robert Vassar, Michael S. Wolfe, Berisłav V. Zlokovic
- 2008: Clifford R. Jack, Jr., William E. Klunk, and Chester A. Mathis
- 2007: Richard Mayeux
- 2006: Karen Ashe, Karen Duff, and Bradley Hyman
- 2005: John C. Morris, and Ronald C. Petersen
- 2004: Leon J. Thal, Roger M. Nitsch
- 2003: David M. Holtzman, Ashley I. Bush
- 2002: Christian Haass, Bart De Strooper
- 2001: Dale Schenk
- 2000: Maria Grazia Spillantini, Michael L. Hutton
- 1999: Arne Brun, Kirk Wilhelmsen, Bernardino Ghetti
- 1998: Michel Goedert, Virginia M.-Y. Lee, John Q. Trojanowski
- 1997: Sangram S. Sisodia, Elio Lugaresi, Pierluigi Gambetti
- 1996: Rudolph Tanzi, Peter St. George-Hyslop
- 1995: Steven G. Younkin, Khalid Iqbal, Yasuo Ihara
- 1994: Allen D. Roses, Gerard D. Schellenberg
- 1993: Blas Frangione, Alison Goate, John Hardy, Christine Van Broeckhoven
- 1992: Donald L. Price, Robert Katzman
- 1991: Stanley B. Prusiner
- 1990: Colin L. Masters, Konrad Beyreuther
- 1989: Dennis Selkoe, George G. Glenner
- 1988: Robert D. Terry

== See also ==
- List of medicine awards
- List of neuroscience awards
