= Claudia Kawas =

American neurologist

- Awards: Potamkin Prize (2017)

Academic background
- Education: Swarthmore College; MD, University of Louisville

Academic work
- Institutions: University of California, Irvine; Johns Hopkins University

Claudia H. Kawas is an American neurologist. As the Al and Trish Nichols Chair in clinical neurology at the University of California, Irvine School of Medicine, Kawas established the Leisure World Cohort Study to monitor the health and well-being of people 90 and older in Laguna Woods, California.

== Early life and education ==
Kawas was born to parents Elias and Jeanette Kawas and her family moved to Madisonville, Kentucky when she was in sixth grade. She attended Madisonville North Hopkins High School and was a member of their speech and debate team. As a senior, she won first place in the extemporaneous speaking and dramatic interpretation division and was judged as the top speaker of the entire tournament.

Upon graduating in 1970, Kawas attended Swarthmore College for her undergraduate degree and completed her medical studies at the University of Louisville School of Medicine. During her undergraduate degree, Kawas was encouraged to study brain injuries as a physician.

== Career ==
Upon completing her medical degree, Kawas completed a two-year fellowship at Johns Hopkins University School of Medicine in 1985. Upon completing the fellowship, she remained at the institution to study Alzheimer's disease. As a faculty member, she collaborated with epidemiologist Walter Stewart and partook in the Baltimore Longitudinal Study on Aging. In 1997, she co-led a study examining the impact of estrogen on the risk of Alzheimer's disease. Kawas left Johns Hopkins in 2000 to accept a similar faculty appointment at the University of California, Irvine.

As the Al and Trish Nichols Chair in clinical neurology, Kawas established the Leisure World Cohort Study (currently called the 90+ Study) to monitor the health and well-being of people 90 and older in Laguna Woods, California. In 2012, she was honored as a Visionary Woman for her clinical contributions to Alzheimer's disease research and care by the Orange County Chapter of the Alzheimer's Association. The following year, the National Institute on Aging renewed its funding for the Leisure World Cohort Study for another five years.

In 2017, Kawas was presented with the Khalid Iqbal, Ph.D., Lifetime Achievement Award in Alzheimer's Disease Research for her "for her numerous contributions to clinical and epidemiological research in Alzheimer’s disease, aging and dementia." In the same year, she also received the American Academy of Neurology's Potamkin Prize for dementia research.
