= Gary Bassell =

American cell biologist

Gary J. Bassell
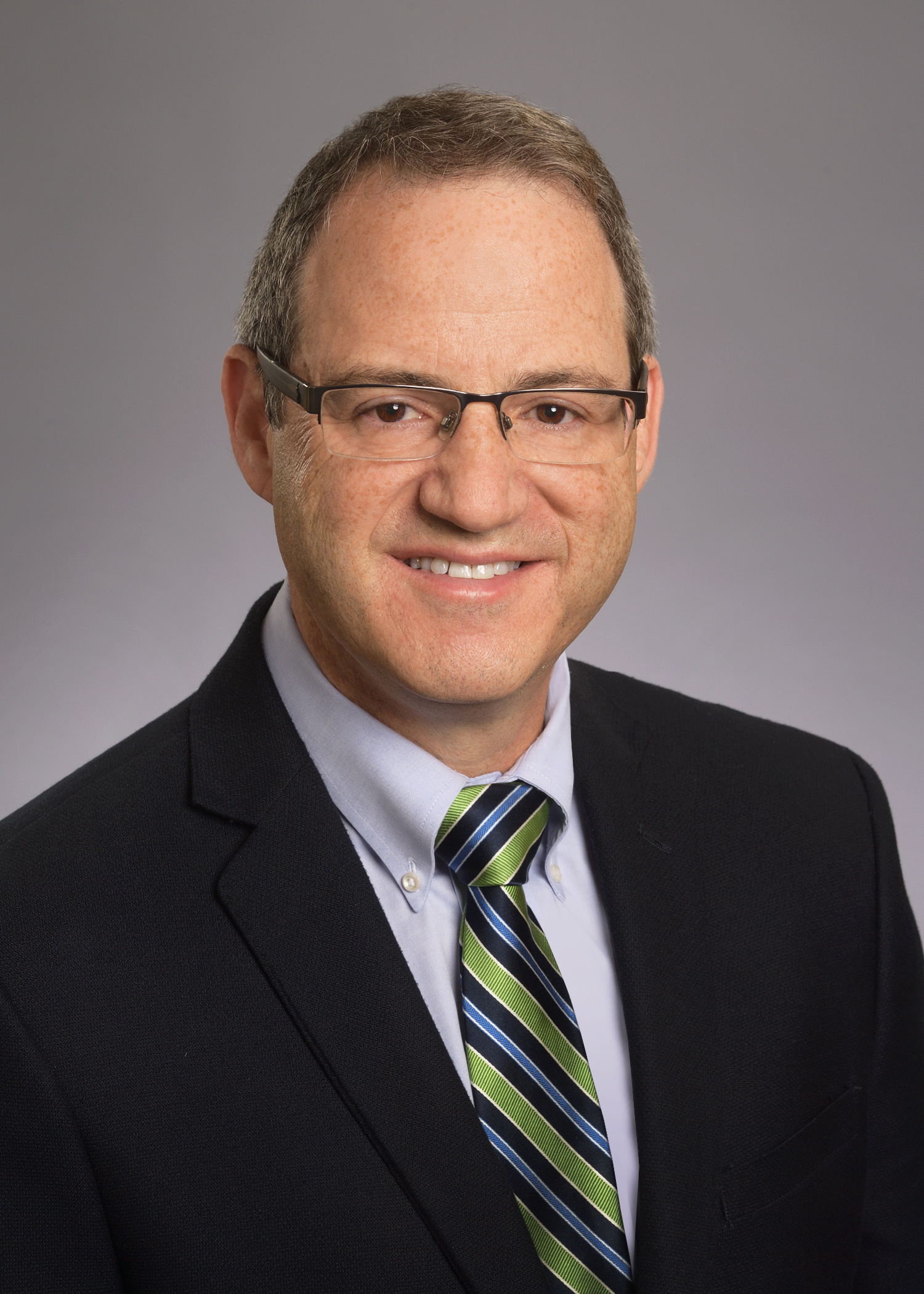
- Born: Hartford, CT
- Education: Framingham State University; University of Massachusetts Medical School
- Scientific career
- Workplaces: Brigham and Women’s Hospital; Albert Einstein College of Medicine; Emory University School of Medicine
- Thesis: Development and application of ultrastructural in situ hybridization to visualize the spatial organization of mRNA (1992)
- Doctoral advisor: Robert H. Singer
- Other academic advisors: Kenneth S. Kosik
- Website: https://med.emory.edu/directory/profile/?u=GBASSEL

Gary J. Bassell is an American cell biologist who is the Charles Howard Candler Professor and Chair of the Department of Cell Biology at Emory University School of Medicine. His research focuses on mRNA localization and local protein synthesis within neurons, how these processes are disrupted in neurological disease, and potential therapies.

== Early life and education ==
Bassell majored in chemistry at Framingham State University, where he initially considered becoming a high school science teacher and briefly had an interest in forensic science before getting involved in a biochemistry research project. This led him to pursue a PhD in biomedical science at the University of Massachusetts Medical School, which he completed in 1992. His thesis research, conducted in the lab of Robert H. Singer, focused on the interactions of polyribosomes, mRNA, and RNA-binding proteins with cytoskeletal filaments in fibroblasts.

Following his PhD, Bassell became interested in the neuron as a model for studying RNA transport due to its highly polarized nature. He conducted his postdoctoral research with Kenneth Kosik in the Center for Neurological Diseases of the Brigham and Women’s Hospital at Harvard Medical School.

== Career ==
In 1995, Bassell joined the faculty of Albert Einstein College of Medicine, first as a member of the Department of Anatomy and Structural Biology, then, in 1998, as a member of the Department of Neuroscience and Rose F. Kennedy Intellectual and Developmental Disabilities Research Center. Bassell moved to Emory University School of Medicine in 2005, where he has been professor in the departments of cell biology and neurology since 2009. Bassell currently holds the following positions at Emory: Charles Howard Candler professor of cell biology, chair of Department of Cell Biology, professor of Department of Neurology, and scientific director of the Emory Stem Cell and Organoids Core. Bassell is also a member of the Scientific and Clinical Advisory Committee for the National Fragile X Foundation and a standing member of the National Institute of Health Neurological Science and Disorders Study Section (2023-2027).

== Research ==
The Bassell lab is interested in understanding the roles mRNA-binding proteins play in post-transcriptional regulation of gene expression in the nervous system. This includes investigating mRNA-binding proteins in mRNA transport and local protein synthesis needed for neuronal development and synaptic plasticity. The Bassell lab is also interested in how failures of these processes can lead to neurodevelopmental and neurodegenerative disorders, such as Fragile X Syndrome, autism spectrum disorders, spinal muscular atrophy, amyotrophic lateral sclerosis, and myotonic dystrophy. The lab uses mice to model neurological diseases and investigate the role of mRNA regulation and local protein synthesis in axon guidance, synapse development and neuronal signaling. As director of the Laboratory of Translational Cell Biology (LTCB), Bassell is also interested in the development of models of neurologic diseases using induced pluripotent stem cell (iPSC) derived from patients at Emory University Hospital.

== Awards and honors ==
- 2013 - NARSAD Distinguished Investigator
- 2011 - Trailblazer Award, Autism Speaks
- 2010 - Distinguished Alumni Achievement Award, Framingham State University
- 2009 - NARSAD Independent Investigator Award
- 2004 - Irma Hirschl/Weill-Caulier Career Scientist Award
- 2004 - Dana Foundation Award in Brain Imaging (Molecular and Cellular Imaging)
- 1996 - Basal O’Connor Scholar Award, March of Dimes

== Selected publications ==
- Gross, Christina; Banerjee, Anwesha; Tiwari, Durgesh; Longo, Francesco; White, Angela R.; Allen, A. G.; Schroeder-Carter, Lindsay M.; Krzeski, Joseph C.; Elsayed, Nada A.; Puckett, Rosemary; Klann, Eric; Rivero, Ralph A.; Gourley, Shannon L.; Bassell, Gary J. (13 July 2018). "Isoform-selective phosphoinositide 3-kinase inhibition ameliorates a broad range of fragile X syndrome-associated deficits in a mouse model". Neuropsychopharmacology. 44 (2): 324–333. doi:10.1038/s41386-018-0150-5. ISSN 1740-634X. PMC 6300538. PMID 30061744.
- Fallini, Claudia; Donlin-Asp, Paul G.; Rouanet, Jeremy P.; Bassell, Gary J.; Rossoll, Wilfried (30 March 2016). "Deficiency of the Survival of Motor Neuron Protein Impairs mRNA Localization and Local Translation in the Growth Cone of Motor Neurons". The Journal of Neuroscience. 36 (13): 3811–3820. doi:10.1523/JNEUROSCI.2396-15.2016. ISSN 1529-2401. PMC 4812137. PMID 27030765.
- Gross, Christina; Chang, Chia-Wei; Kelly, Seth M.; Bhattacharya, Aditi; McBride, Sean M. J.; Danielson, Scott W.; Jiang, Michael Q.; Chan, Chi Bun; Ye, Keqiang; Gibson, Jay R.; Klann, Eric; Jongens, Thomas A.; Moberg, Kenneth H.; Huber, Kimberly M.; Bassell, Gary J. (5 May 2015). "Increased expression of the PI3K enhancer PIKE mediates deficits in synaptic plasticity and behavior in fragile X syndrome". Cell Reports. 11 (5): 727–736. doi:10.1016/j.celrep.2015.03.060. ISSN 2211-1247. PMC 4418204. PMID 25921541.
- Gross, Christina; Raj, Nisha; Molinaro, Gemma; Allen, Amanda G.; Whyte, Alonzo J.; Gibson, Jay R.; Huber, Kimberly M.; Gourley, Shannon L.; Bassell, Gary J. (5 May 2015). "Selective role of the catalytic PI3K subunit p110β in impaired higher order cognition in fragile X syndrome". Cell Reports. 11 (5): 681–688. doi:10.1016/j.celrep.2015.03.065. ISSN 2211-1247. PMC 4426038. PMID 25921527.
- Gross, Christina; Bassell, Gary J. (9 May 2012). "Excess protein synthesis in FXS patient lymphoblastoid cells can be rescued with a p110β-selective inhibitor". Molecular Medicine. 18 (1): 336–345. doi:10.2119/molmed.2011.00363. ISSN 1528-3658. PMC 3356413. PMID 22207187.
- Muddashetty, Ravi S.; Nalavadi, Vijayalaxmi C.; Gross, Christina; Yao, Xiaodi; Xing, Lei; Laur, Oskar; Warren, Stephen T.; Bassell, Gary J. (10 July 2011). "Reversible inhibition of PSD-95 mRNA translation by miR-125a, FMRP phosphorylation, and mGluR signaling". Molecular Cell. 42 (5): 673–688. doi:10.1016/j.molcel.2011.05.006. ISSN 1097-4164. PMC 3115785. PMID 21658607.
- Gross, Christina; Nakamoto, Mika; Yao, Xiaodi; Chan, Chi-Bun; Yim, So Y.; Ye, Keqiang; Warren, Stephen T.; Bassell, Gary J. (11 August 2010). "Excess phosphoinositide 3-kinase subunit synthesis and activity as a novel therapeutic target in fragile X syndrome". Journal of Neuroscience. 30 (32): 10624–10638. doi:10.1523/JNEUROSCI.0402-10.2010. ISSN 1529-2401. PMC 2924772. PMID 20702695.
- Dictenberg, Jason B.; Swanger, Sharon A.; Antar, Laura N.; Singer, Robert H.; Bassell, Gary J. (2008). "A direct role for FMRP in activity-dependent dendritic mRNA transport links filopodial-spine morphogenesis to fragile X syndrome". Developmental Cell. 14 (6): 926–939. doi:10.1016/j.devcel.2008.04.003. ISSN 1878-1551. PMC 2453222. PMID 18539120.
- Zhang, H. L.; Eom, T.; Oleynikov, Y.; Shenoy, S. M.; Liebelt, D. A.; Dictenberg, J. B.; Singer, R. H.; Bassell, G. J. (2 August 2001). "Neurotrophin-induced transport of a beta-actin mRNP complex increases beta-actin levels and stimulates growth cone motility". Neuron. 31 (2): 261–275. doi:10.1016/s0896-6273(01)00357-9. ISSN 0896-6273. PMID 11502257.
- Bassell, G. J.; Zhang, H.; Byrd, A. L.; Femino, A. M.; Singer, R. H.; Taneja, K. L.; Lifshitz, L. M.; Herman, I. M.; Kosik, K. S. (1 January 1998). "Sorting of beta-actin mRNA and protein to neurites and growth cones in culture". Journal of Neuroscience. 18 (1): 251–265. doi:10.1523/JNEUROSCI.18-01-00251.1998. ISSN 0270-6474. PMC 6793411. PMID 9412505.
