= Mallucci =

Mallucci is an Italian surname. Notable people with the surname include:

- Giovanna Mallucci (born 1963), professor in the Department of Clinical Neurosciences at the University of Cambridge
- Vittorugo Mallucci, Italian racing driver
