= Dale Schenk =

Neuroscientist and Alzheimer researcher (1957-2016)

Dale B. Schenk
- Born: Dale Bernard Schenk; May 10, 1957; Pasadena California USA
- Died: 30 September 2016 (aged 59); Hillsborough, California
- Education: University of California, San Diego
- Occupation: Scientist
- Known for: Medical Research

Dale Schenk (1957 - 2016) was a neuroscientist and entrepreneur who was best known for his work on immunotherapy for Alzheimer’s disease. He was a researcher and executive at Athena Neurosciences, which was acquired by Dublin-based Élan Pharmaceuticals in 1996 and then spun off as Prothena Biosciences in 2012. There, Schenk served as president and chief executive until his death in 2016.

== Education ==
Schenk received his BS in biology and his PhD in pharmacology and physiology from the University of California, San Diego.

== Scientific contributions ==
Schenk had a longstanding interest in the biology of antibodies, which led to his research at Athena and Élan in which he sought to harness the immune system to treat Alzheimer’s disease. In 1994, in collaboration with scientists at Johns Hopkins University, he found that antibodies to the Aβ protein can cross into the brain from the cerebrospinal fluid and bind to Aβ plaques in the brains of experimental animals. Then, in 1999 he reported that immunization produced antibodies against Aβ and reduced the number of cerebral Aβ plaques in a transgenic mouse model. Although Élan eventually stopped development of the vaccine due to serious side-effects, Schenk's publication is credited with pioneering immune-based therapeutic approaches to Alzheimer's disease. For this work, he was awarded the American Academy of Neurology's Potamkin Prize, the first scientist from the pharmaceutical industry to be so honored. Schenk also investigated the potential of immune-based therapies for Parkinson’s disease and other illnesses caused by the abnormal buildup of proteins in the body.

== Awards and honors ==
- The 2001 Potamkin Prize for research in Pick's, Alzheimer's, and related diseases.

== Selected publications ==
- Schenk, DB; Leffert, HL (1983). "Monoclonal antibodies to rat Na+,K+-ATPase block enzymatic activity". Proceedings of the National Academy of Sciences. 80 (17): 5281–5285. doi:10.1073/pnas.80.17.5281. PMC 384237. PMID 6310568..
- Schenk, DB; Rydel, RE; May, P; Little, S; Panetta, J; Lieberburg, I; Sinha, S (1995). "Therapeutic approaches related to amyloid-beta peptide and Alzheimer's disease". Journal of Medicinal Chemistry. 38 (21): 4141–4154. doi:10.1021/jm00021a001. PMID 7473539..
- Schenk, DB; Seubert, P; Lieberburg, I; Wallace, J (2000). "Beta-peptide immunization: a possible new treatment for Alzheimer disease". Archives of Neurology. 57 (7): 934–936. doi:10.1001/archneur.57.7.934. PMID 10891974..
- Schenk, DB; Seubert, P; Grundman, M; Black, R (2005). "Abeta immunotherapy: Lessons learned for potential treatment of Alzheimer's disease". Neurodegenerative Diseases. 2 (5): 255–260. doi:10.1159/000090365. PMID 16909006..
- Schenk, DB; Koller, M; Ness, DK; Griffith, SG; Grundman, M; Zago, W; Soto, J; Atiee, G; Ostrowitzki, S; Kinney, GG (2017). "First-in-human assessment of PRX002, an anti-α-synuclein monoclonal antibody, in healthy volunteers". Movement Disorders. 32 (2): 211–218. doi:10.1002/mds.26878. PMC 5324684. PMID 27886407..
