= George G. Glenner =

American medical researcher (1927-1995)

Dr. George G. Glenner

George Geiger Glenner (September 17, 1927 – July 12, 1995) was an American physician and research pathologist whose work helped shape understanding of Alzheimer's disease research in the United States. He is best known for identifying beta-amyloid, a protein fragment that accumulates in the brains of people with Alzheimer's disease. Glenner conducted research at the National Institutes of Health (NIH) and later at the University of California at San Diego Medical School, where he established and directed what was described as "the first brain bank" for Alzheimer's disease diagnosis and research in the United States. The program was designed to facilitate the study of brain tissue from deceased patients suspected of having the disease.

Glenner's work contributed to recognition of Alzheimer's disease as a distinct disorder rather than an expected part of aging, at a time of growing interest in the condition. He participated in efforts to increase public and government awareness of Alzheimer's disease, testifying before lawmakers and serving on scientific and advisory boards related to dementia and aging.

In 1982, Glenner and his wife, Joy Glenner, founded the Alzheimer's Family Center, Inc., in San Diego. The nonprofit 501(c)(3) was among the earliest adult day health programs for people with Alzheimer's disease and their caregivers and was considered a national model for this type of service. Over time, the nonprofit expanded to open six centers in San Diego County, and as of the 2020s, operated three centers across the region. The nonprofit also grew to provide workforce development training for nursing care for dementia patients. In Glenner's honor, the organization was renamed the George G. Glenner Alzheimer's Family Centers, Inc. in the early 1990s.

Glenner continued research and public engagement in the years leading up until his death in 1995.

== Early life and education ==
=== Early life ===
George Geiger Glenner was born on September 17, 1927, in Brooklyn, New York. He attended Lower Merion High School in Ardmore, Pennsylvania, where he excelled as a track athlete.

=== College and medical training ===
From there, Glenner continued his studies at Johns Hopkins University, where he earned a bachelor's degree in 1949 and a Doctor of Medicine degree in 1953.

=== Postgraduate training ===
After medical school, Glenner completed a surgical internship at Mount Sinai Hospital in New York. He then studied pathology at the Mallory Institute of Pathology at Boston City Hospital.

== Career and contributions ==
=== National Institutes of Health ===
Glenner joined the National Institutes of Health (NIH) in 1955 as a research pathologist and later served as the Chief of the Molecular Pathology Section.

=== UC San Diego ===
In 1980, Glenner began what was originally intended to be a one-year sabbatical leave to conduct Alzheimer's disease research at UC San Diego School of Medicine. The position became permanent in 1982, when Glenner joined the UC San Diego School of Medicine as a research pathologist. At UC San Diego, Glenner studied Alzheimer's disease as part of a new research laboratory focused on amyloid and its association with neurodegenerative disease. He also established one of the first Alzheimer's brain banks in the United States. The bank enabled definitive postmortem Alzheimer's diagnoses and provided tissue samples for research internationally.

=== Development of the Glenner Alzheimer's Family Centers ===
In 1982, George and Joy Glenner also co-founded the Alzheimer's Family Center, one of the earliest adult daycare health programs for Alzheimer's and dementia care in the U.S. The organization emphasized structured social programming for patients and provided respite for caregivers. Glenner served as volunteer medical director while continuing research at UC San Diego. In the early 1990s, the organization was renamed the George G. Glenner Alzheimer's Family Centers, Inc.

In 1987, the Glenners established an associated training program that offered nursing instruction for dementia care. The program addressed a growing need for Alzheimer's focused clinical training as the number of people with the condition was expected to continue to rise.

A 1992 San Diego Union-Tribune article highlighted Glenner's dual focus on both the science and humanitarian sides of Alzheimer's disease, stating, "rarely do research physicians become so personally involved".

=== Professional leadership and public engagement ===
Glenner served in several professional and civic leadership roles as Alzheimer's advocacy expanded in the 1980s. This included chairing the California Governor's Alzheimer's Disease Task Force, serving on the national Board of Directors and Medical/Scientific Advisory Board of the Alzheimer's Disease and Related Disorders Association (ADRDA), and advising the organization's San Diego chapter. He testified before state and federal lawmakers, supported early national awareness campaigns including the designation of National Alzheimer's Disease Week, and advocated for additional research funding and caregiver support as Alzheimer's disease was increasingly recognized as a public health concern.

== Medical and research work ==
Glenner's scientific work focused on amyloidosis, a group of conditions in which proteins fold abnormally and accumulate in tissues and organs. His work helped clarify the structure of amyloid deposits and advanced early understanding of how amyloid forms and accumulates. Early in his career at the National Institutes of Health (NIH), Glenner helped describe a repeated folded structure, called a β-pleated sheet structure, in amyloid deposits, a feature not seen in normal tissues.

After moving to UC San Diego in 1980, Glenner shifted his research toward amyloid deposits in the brain and their potential connection to Alzheimer's disease. As part of his work, he established an Alzheimer's dedicated brain bank, enabling researchers to examine disease pathology across multiple cases using postmortem samples.

In 1984, Glenner's laboratory isolated and characterized beta-amyloid, the protein fragment that accumulates in the plaques found in the brains of people with Alzheimer's disease. This finding helped establish a biological basis for the disorder and influenced subsequent efforts to understand its causes and develop treatments.

He published widely in peer-reviewed journals, co-edited scientific volumes on amyloidosis, and authored papers that became foundational references in the study of amyloid structure, formation, and disease.

== Advocacy and public awareness ==
Glenner became active in efforts to expand public awareness of Alzheimer's disease and support for research. He served on scientific and advisory boards connected to the then-Alzheimer's Disease and Related Disorders Association (ADRDA), later known as the Alzheimer's Association. His roles included service on the organization's national Medical/Scientific Board, the national Board of Directors, and advisory work for the San Diego chapter.

Glenner also participated in legislative and policy discussions aimed at increasing federal and state attention on Alzheimer's disease. He testified before the United States Senate in 1988 and supported efforts to increase research funding and establish structured programs for families affected by dementia.

In 1982, he and his wife, Joy Glenner, were among those who attended a White House observance, presided over by then President Ronald Reagan, designating National Alzheimer's Disease Week, following the passage of a joint congressional resolution and a United States presidential proclamation.

At the state level, Glenner served as chair of the California State Alzheimer's Disease Task Force, which advised on research priorities, gaps in services, and expected increases in the number of people affected by Alzheimer's disease. He also testified before state legislators regarding the scientific understanding of Alzheimer's disease and the anticipated long-term costs of care as the population aged.

== George G. Glenner Alzheimer's Family Centers ==
In 1982, George and Joy Glenner co-founded what is now known as the George G. Glenner Alzheimer's Family Centers, Inc., a 501(c)(3) nonprofit adult day health program that supports individuals with Alzheimer's disease and related dementias and provides respite for family caregivers. The centers were among the earliest dementia-specific adult day programs in the United States using a social-medical model combining structured activities, supervision, and health monitoring.

George and Joy Glenner pinpointed their inspiration to provide such direct services to a specific incident in 1982. While working in the lab with his wife late one night, George Glenner said he received an emergency phone call from a distraught man struggling to care for his wife. The man said he had a gun and was threatening to kill his wife and then shoot himself. After working with law enforcement to avert the imminent murder-suicide, the Glenners set out to help families manage Alzheimer's disease through community-based daycare services. George Glenner served as the organization's volunteer medical director while continuing his research at UC San Diego.

In 1987, the couple expanded the program to include a dementia-care workforce training school, which offered instruction for Certified Nursing Assistants and Alzheimer's Care Specialists to meet increasing demand for skilled dementia care.

== Awards and honors ==
Glenner has received recognition for his research in amyloid diseases and contributions to Alzheimer's patient care and advocacy.

=== National and scientific Honors ===
- MERIT Award, National Institute on Aging (1988) – award to support long-term Alzheimer's research
- Potamkin Prize for Alzheimer's Disease Research, American Academy of Neurology (1989)
- Metropolitan Life Foundation Award in Medical Research (1989)
- Glenn Foundation Award, Gerontological Society of America (1991) – inaugural recipient for contributions to aging research

=== Community and service awards ===
- U.S. Presidential Commendation
- United Way/JC Penney Golden Rule Award (1990) - recognized for voluntary contributions to Alzheimer's support services
- San Diego Citizen of the Year, jointly with Joy Glenner (1985) (The San Diego Union newspaper)

=== Academic and institutional recognition ===
- Distinguished Alumnus Award, Johns Hopkins University School of Medicine (1993)
- Recognized by peers at the International Conference on Alzheimer's Disease and Related Disorders (1994) for contributions to Alzheimer's research
- The George G. Glenner Award, established at the UC San Diego School of Medicine, is presented annually to a graduating medical student demonstrating clinical skill, scientific rigor, and compassionate care, the attributes exemplified by Dr. Glenner

== Personal life ==
Glenner lived in the Rancho Santa Fe area of San Diego County in his later years. He was diagnosed in 1991 with what is today known as amyloid cardiomyopathy, a rare heart condition caused by the buildup of amyloid proteins. Despite his illness, Glenner remained professionally active and continued his research interests during the final years of his life.

Glenner died at his home on July 12, 1995, at age 67.

In the years immediately before his death, Glenner continued to pursue scientific questions related to Alzheimer's disease. According to contemporary reporting, he believed he had identified an enzyme involved in beta-amyloid formation.

== Selected publications ==
Glenner published extensively in peer-reviewed medical journals, and his research on amyloid diseases was widely cited and influential in shaping subsequent studies of amyloid structure and Alzheimer's disease.

1. Glenner, G. G. et al. Amyloid fibril proteins: Proof of homology with immunoglobulin light chains by sequence analyses. Science, 172:1150–1151 (1971).
2. Glenner, G. G. & Wong, C. W. (ed. or contributor) Amyloidosis. (scientific volume/collection)
3. Glenner, G. G. Amyloid deposits and amyloidosis: The β-fibrilloses (first of two parts). New England Journal of Medicine, 302(23):1283–1292 (1980).
4. Glenner, G. G., Eanes, E. D., & Wiley, C. A. Amyloid fibrils formed from a segment of the amyloid protein. Proceedings of the National Academy of Sciences of the United States of America, 79(24), 7894–7898 (1982).
5. Glenner, G. G. & Wong, C. W. Alzheimer's disease: Initial report of the purification and characterization of a novel cerebrovascular amyloid protein. Biochemical and Biophysical Research Communications, 120(3):885–890 (1984).
