= Nun Study =

Alzheimer's article on nuns

The Nun Study of Aging and Alzheimer's Disease is a continuing longitudinal study, begun in 1986, to examine the onset of Alzheimer's disease. David Snowdon, an epidemiologist and the founding Nun Study investigator, started the Nun Study at the University of Minnesota, later transferring the study to the University of Kentucky in 1990. In 2008, with Snowdon's retirement, the study returned to the University of Minnesota. The Nun Study was very briefly moved from the University of Minnesota to Northwestern University in 2021 under the directorship of Dr. Margaret Flanagan. The Nun Study is currently housed at the University of Arizona in Tucson under the continued directorship of neuropathologist, Dr. Margaret Flanagan.

The Sisters' autobiographies written just before they took their vows (ages 19–21) revealed that positivity was closely related to longevity and idea density, which is related to conversation and writing. This research found that higher idea density scores correlated with a higher chance of having sufficient mental capacity in late-life, despite neurological evidence that showed the onset of Alzheimer's disease.

In 1992, researchers at Rush University Medical Center Rush Alzheimer's Disease Center (RADC), building on the success of the Nun Study, proposed the Rush Religious Orders Study. The Religious Orders Study was funded by the National Institute on Aging in 1993, and was ongoing, as of 2012.

== Origin and procedure ==
The Nun Study began in 1986 with funding by the National Institute on Aging. This study was focused on a group of 678 American Roman Catholic Sisters who were members of the School Sisters of Notre Dame. The purpose of the study was to conclude if activities, academics, past experiences, and disposition are correlated to continued cognitive, neurological, and physical ability as individuals got older, as well as overall longevity. The Nun Study participants were gathered on a volunteer basis following a presentation on the importance of donating one's brain for research purposes after death. Prior to the study's beginning, researchers required the participants to be cognitively intact and at least 75 years of age and for the Sisters to participate in the study until time of death. Participation in the study included the following: all participants gave permission for researchers to have access to their autobiographies and personal documented information and to participate in regular physical and mental examinations. These examinations were designed to test the subject's proficiency with object identification, memory, orientation, and language. These categories were tested through a series of mental state examinations with the data being recorded with each passing test. Nun Study participants were asked to give permission for their brains to be donated at time of death so that their brains could be neuropathologically evaluated for changes related to Alzheimer's disease and other dementias. Neuropathology evaluations for the Nun Study were performed by creating microscope slides from brain autopsy samples. Microscope slides that were created from the Nun Study brain autopsy samples were carefully evaluated for changes of Alzheimer's disease by specialized Physicians called Neuropathologists.

All Nun Study participants willingly signed a form agreeing to the terms of the study. As of 2017, there were three participants still living. Studying a relatively homogeneous group (no drug use, little or no alcohol, similar housing and reproductive histories) minimized the extraneous variables that may confound other similar research studies.

During the examination process Snowdon was able to compare the collected cognitive test scores with the neuropathology data that was obtained from examining the brains of the subject and quantifying microscopic changes. These results assisted in giving new layers of understanding to the nature of Alzheimer's disease and other dementias. He concluded that Alzheimer's disease is likely caused by early childhood experiences or trauma instead of something from adulthood.

== Results ==
Researchers accessed the convent archive to review documents amassed throughout the lives of the nuns in the study. They also collected data via annual cognitive and physical function examinations conducted throughout the remainder of the participants' lives. After the death of a participant, the researchers would evaluate the brains of the deceased to assess any brain pathology. Neuropathology evaluations for the Nun Study were performed by creating microscope slides from brain autopsy samples. Microscope slides that were created from the Nun Study brain autopsy samples were carefully evaluated for changes of Alzheimer's disease by specialized Physicians called Neuropathologists. The original Neuropathologist for the Nun Study was Dr. William Markesbery.

=== Writing, emotions, lifestyle and cognition ===
One of the major findings from the nun study was how the participants' lifestyle and education may deter Alzheimer's symptoms. Participants who had an education level of a bachelor's degree or higher were less likely to develop Alzheimer's later in life. They also lived longer than their colleagues who did not have higher education. Furthermore, the participants' word choice and vocabulary were also correlated to the development of Alzheimer's. Among the documents reviewed were autobiographical essays that were written by the nuns upon joining the sisterhood. Upon review, it was found that an essay's lack of linguistic density (e.g., complexity, vivacity, fluency) functioned as a significant predictor of its author's risk for developing Alzheimer's disease in old age. However, the study also found that the Sisters who wrote positively in their personal journals were more likely to live longer than their counterparts.

Snowdon and associates found three indicators of longer life when coding the sister's autobiographies: the number of positive sentences, positive words, and the variety of positive emotions used. The less positivity in writing correlated with greater mortality. There were many variables this study was unable to glean from the autobiographies of the sisters, such as long term hopefulness or bleakness in one's personality, optimism, pessimism, ambition, and others.

The average age of nuns who began an autobiography was 22 years. Some participants who used more advanced words in their autobiography had less symptoms of Alzheimer's in older years. Roughly 80% of nuns whose writing was measured as lacking in linguistic density went on to develop Alzheimer's disease in old age; meanwhile, of those whose writing was not lacking, only 10% later developed the disease. This was found when researchers examined neuropathology after nuns died, confirming that most of those who had a low idea density had Alzheimer's disease, and most of those with high idea density did not.

Snowdon found that exercise was inversely correlated with development of Alzheimer's disease, showing that participants who engaged in some sort of daily exercise were more likely to retain cognitive abilities during aging. Participants who started exercising later in life were more likely to retain cognitive abilities, even if not having exercised before.

=== Neuropathology ===
In 1992, a gene called apolipoprotein E was established as a possible factor in Alzheimer's disease, but its presence did not predict disease with certainty. Existence of amyloid beta plaques and Tau neurofibrillary tangles in the brain are required for the diagnosis of Alzheimer's Disease Neuropathologic Change to be made. Results from the Nun Study indicated that Tau neurofibrillary tangles located in regions of the brain outside the neocortex and hippocampus may have less of an effect than amyloid beta plaques located within those same areas. Another important factor was brain weight, as subjects with brains weighing under 1000 grams were seen as higher risk than those in a higher weight class.

== Conclusions and further research ==
Overall, findings of the Nun Study indicated multiple factors concerning expression of Alzheimer's traits. The data primarily stated that age and disease do not always guarantee impaired cognitive ability and "that traits in early, mid, and late life have strong relationships with the risk of Alzheimer's disease, as well as the mental and cognitive disabilities of old age."

The findings influenced other scientific studies and discoveries, one of which indicated that if a person has a stroke, there is a smaller requirement of Alzheimer's brain lesions necessary to diagnose a person with dementia. Another is that postmortem MRI scans of the hippocampus can help distinguish that some nondemented individuals fit the criteria for Alzheimer's disease. Researchers have also used the autopsy data to determine that there is a relationship between the number of teeth an individual has at death with how likely they were to have had dementia. Those with fewer teeth were more likely to have dementia while living. Another study reaffirmed the findings of The Nun Study that higher idea density is correlated with better cognition during aging, even if the individual had brain lesions resembling those of Alzheimer's disease. A 2019 study combined The Nun Study and Max Weber's vocational lectures, indicating that the vocation and lifestyle of nuns correlated with lower potential for developing dementia. More precisely, even though biological markers for dementia were present (at post-mortem analyses), the clinical (behavioral and cognitive) manifestation of those symptoms was prevented by the quality of vocation, through education, occupation, community lifestyle and other factors that "boost" cognitive reserve. Using research from the original study, Weinstein et al. found a correlation between longevity and autonomy. Subjects were shown to have a longer lifespan based on the amount of purposeful and reflective behavior shown in their writing.
