= Kristine Yaffe =

American scholar

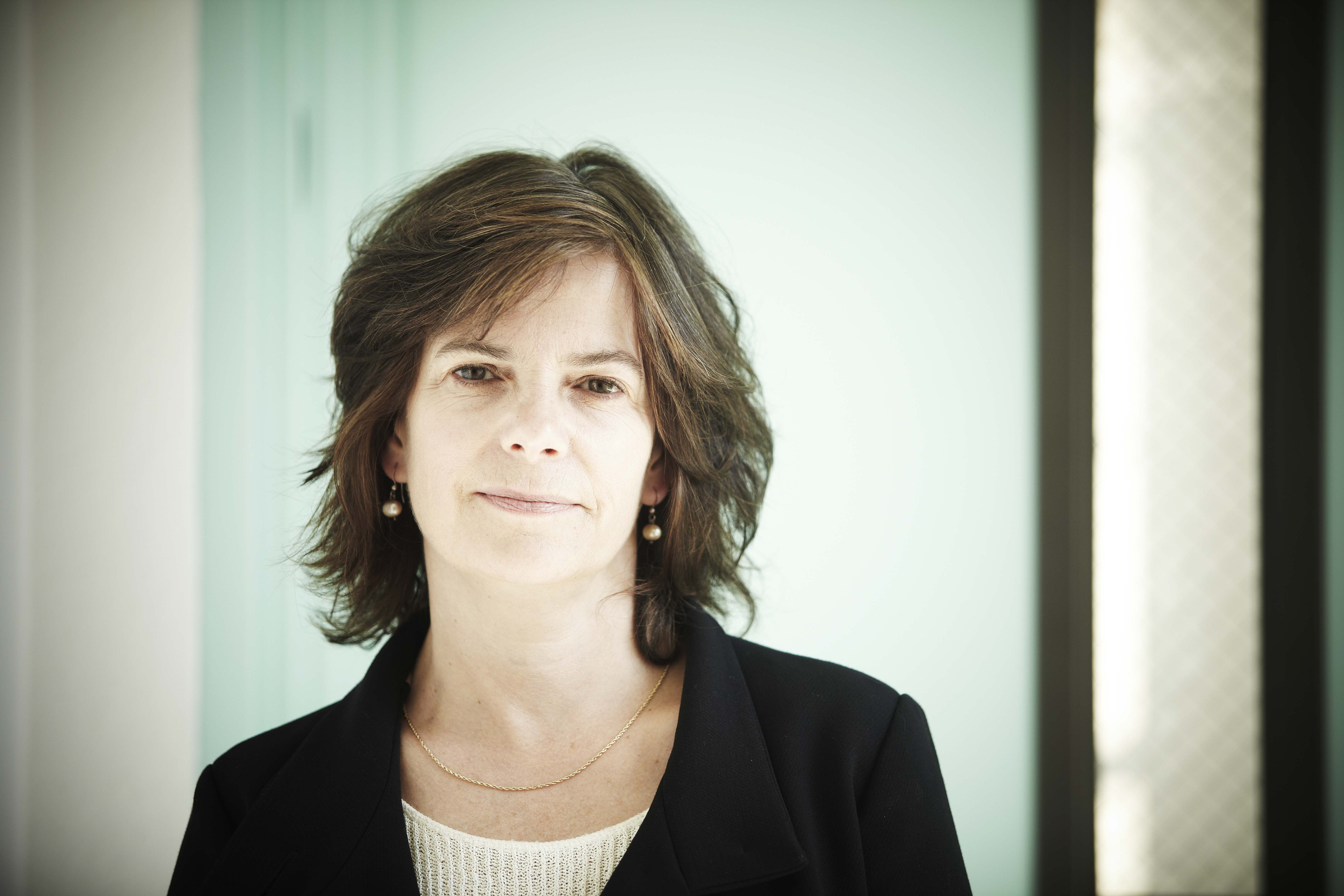
- Born: Kristine Segre
- Education: Yale University; University of Pennsylvania; University of California, San Francisco
- Occupation: Professor at UCSF School of Medicine
- Known for: Cognitive decline and dementia research
- Awards: Potamkin Prize (2017)
- Website: profiles.ucsf.edu/kristine.yaffe

Kristine Yaffe is an American cognitive decline and dementia researcher. She is the Scola Endowed Chair and Vice Chair and Professor of Psychiatry, Neurology and Epidemiology and the Director of the Center for Population Brain Health at the University of California, San Francisco. In 2019, Yaffe was elected to the National Academy of Medicine.

== Education ==
Yaffe double-majored in biology and psychology at Yale University and studied medicine at the University of Pennsylvania.

== Awards and honors ==
Yaffe has received numerous awards including the American Academy of Neurology Potamkin Prize for Research in Pick's, Alzheimer's, and Related Diseases, a prestigious honor considered to be the Nobel Prize of Alzheimer's research. In 2013, she received the UCSF Academic Senate Award for Best Faculty Research. The following year, Yaffe was recognized as one of Thomson Reuters World's Most Influential Scientific Minds and received the Distinguished Scientist Award from the American Association for Geriatric Psychiatry. In 2017, Yaffe gave testimony to the United States Senate's Special Committee on Aging for the hearing: "The Arc of Alzheimer's: From Preventing Cognitive Decline in Americans to Assuring Quality Care for those Living with the Disease." In 2019, Yaffe was elected to the National Academy of Medicine.
