= Eva-Maria Mandelkow =

German Alzheimer's researcher

- Citizenship: Germany
- Known for: Alzheimer's disease
- Spouse: Eckhard Mandelkow
- Awards: Metlife Foundation Award for Medical Research in Alzheimer's Disease (2009); Potamkin Prize (2011); Khalid Iqbal Lifetime Achievement Award in Alzheimer’s Disease Research (2013)
- Scientific career
- Fields: neurology
- Institutions: DZNE, Bonn (2011-); MPASMB, Hamburg

Eva-Maria Mandelkow is a German neuroscientist and Alzheimer's disease researcher at the German Center for Neurodegenerative Diseases (DZNE), Bonn.

== Biography ==
Eva-Maria Mandelkow studied medicine in Hamburg and Heidelberg, qualifying in 1968. After three years of medical internships, she began doctoral studies at the Max Planck Institute for Medical Research, Heidelberg, investigating the enzyme kinetics of the motor protein myosin. She graduated in 1973 with a Ph.D. in biochemistry, then undertook postdoctoral training at Brandeis University in Massachusetts (1974–1975) researching cytoskeletal proteins. She continued to work in this area after returning to the Max Planck Institute in Heidelberg as a staff scientist (1977–1985). In 1986 she moved with her husband and colleague, Eckhard Mandelkow, to lead research teams at the Max Planck Unit for Structural Molecular Biology (MPASMB) located within the DESY facility, Hamburg. Since 2011 Eva-Maria and Eckhard Mandelow have led closely aligned research teams at DZNE.

== Awards ==
The Mandelkows' best-known work is on the role of tau protein in the development of Alzheimer's disease, which they have been studying since 1989. Mandelkow won the Hans and Ilse Breuer Foundation Alzheimer's Research Award in 2007. Eva-Maria and her husband were jointly awarded the Metlife Foundation Award for Medical Research in Alzheimer's Disease in 2009, the Potamkin Prize of the American Academy of Neurology in 2011 (the goal of the prize is to help attract the best medical minds and most dedicated scientists in the world to the field of dementia research), and a Khalid Iqbal Lifetime Achievement Award in Alzheimer’s Disease Research from the Alzheimer's Association in 2013.
