= Gerard Schellenberg =

Alzheimer's researcher

Dr. Gerard Schellenberg
- Education: University of California at Riverside
- Known for: Research on the genetics of Alzheimer's Disease

Gerard David Schellenberg is an academic neuropathologist who specializes in the research of Alzheimer's disease. He is the director of Penn Neurodegeneration Genomics Center as well as a professor of Pathology and Laboratory Medicine at the University of Pennsylvania. He is a leading contributor to Alzheimer's disease research.

== Education ==
Gerard Schellenberg received his bachelor's degree in Cell Biology with a minor in Biochemistry from the University of California, Riverside in 1973. He then went on to receive his Ph.D. in Cell Biology with a minor in Biochemistry from the University of California at Riverside in 1978. Schellenberg completed his postdoctoral research in neuroscience and genetics at the University of Washington in 1983.

== Research and career ==
Schellenberg remained at the University of Washington as a faculty member in the departments of neurology, gerontology and geriatric medicine, and pharmacology. In 2008 Schellenberg joined the faculty at the University of Pennsylvania, Perelman School of Medicine, department of Pathology and Laboratory Medicine. Schellenberg is the principal investigator for the Alzheimer's Disease Genetics Consortium, co-Principal Investigator for the Genome Center for Alzheimer's Disease (GCAD), and one of the founders of the International Genomics of Alzheimer's Disease Project (IGAP).

While at Washington, he was the senior author of a Science article locating the gene and mutations responsible for Werner syndrome, a form of progeria. His neurodegenerative disease research contributed to identification of genes implicated in Alzheimer's disease, including the presenilin 1 and presenilin 2 genes linked to early-onset AD, the RecQ helicase gene (WRN) which causes Werner's Syndrome, the MAPT mutations which cause FTLD-tau type, and subsequently the MAPT association with Guam amyotrophic lateral sclerosis/Parkinson dementia complex and Alzheimer's Disease.

He was awarded the Potamkin Prize for Alzheimer's Disease Research from the American Academy of Neurology in 1994, the Metropolitan Life Foundation Award for Medical Research in 1995, and was an Alzheimer's Association Medical Honoree in 1996. In 2004, the National Institute on Aging awarded him an R37 Merit Award for Genomic Analysis of Alzheimer's Disease.
