= Karen Duff =

British scientist

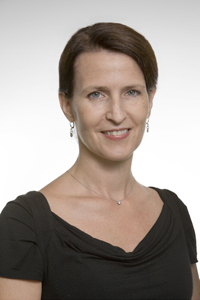
- Born: 1965 (age 60–61)
- Education: University of East Anglia; Queens' College, Cambridge
- Awards: Potamkin Prize (2006)
- Scientific career
- Fields: Pathology; Cell Biology
- Workplaces: University College London; Columbia University; New York University; University of South Florida
- Thesis: A study of human and murine cardiac development using molecular genetics methodology (1991)
- Website: Karen Duff

Karen Elizabeth Keitley Duff (born 1965) is a British scientist known for her work on Alzheimer's disease. Her most notable work focused on the development and characterization of mouse models of Alzheimer's disease amyloid deposition. She became Centre Director of the UK Dementia Research Institute's hub at University College London in spring 2020.

She was educated at the University of East Anglia (BSc, 1987) and completed her PhD at Queens' College, Cambridge in 1991. At Cambridge she was a student of Sydney Brenner's department. She was awarded the Potamkin Prize in 2006, together with Karen Ashe and Bradley Hyman. She was formerly Professor of Pathology and Cell Biology at Columbia University. In 2020, she was awarded the British Neuroscience Association Award for Outstanding Contribution to Neuroscience. She was elected a Fellow of the Academy of Medical Sciences in 2022.

She has an h-index of 96 according to Google Scholar.
