= William Seeley =

William Seeley may refer to:

- William Henry Harrison Seeley (1840–1914), American recipient of the Victoria Cross
- William Seeley (neurologist) (born 1971), American neurology professor
