= Victor Potamkin =

American businessman and car dealership owner

- Born: July 2, 1911; Philadelphia, Pennsylvania, U.S.
- Died: June 5, 1995 (aged 83); Miami, Florida, U.S.
- Occupation: Car dealership owner
- Spouse: Luba Chaiken (m. 1941; died 1994)
- Children: 2

Victor Potamkin (July 2, 1911 – June 5, 1995) was an American businessman and car dealership owner known for deep discounting and aggressive advertising.

== Biography ==
=== Early years ===
Potamkin was born and raised in a Jewish family in Philadelphia, the son of a fish and chicken dealer. He graduated from Germantown High School.

Due to financial difficulties brought on by the Great Depression, he dropped out of the Wharton School of Business at the University of Pennsylvania, and began selling chickens. In order to differentiate his product from other vendors, he sold chicken by the piece using the slogan "Be Smart, Buy a Part." He was very successful and by the time he was in his early twenties, he owned 17 stores.

=== Automotive empire ===
==== Dealerships ====
In 1947, partnering with Matt Slap, he opened a Lincoln-Mercury dealership in Northeast Philadelphia. The store floundered and after discovering that the large Jewish population in the area avoided purchasing Ford cars due to the anti-Semitism associated with Henry Ford, he persuaded Israel's first president, Chaim Weizman, to accept a Lincoln as a gift in 1948 during a public event in New York City. The gimmick worked and the store soon became the largest Lincoln-Mercury dealer in the United States. In 1954, he sold out and opened a Chevrolet dealership in South Philadelphia and soon after expanded into Newark, New Jersey and Miami, Florida.

In 1972, General Motors convinced him to take over their company-owned Cadillac store in Manhattan; GM had been losing money due to high real estate costs and had been unable to find an independent car dealer to take over the franchise. Counter-intuitively, and to the chagrin of GM who wanted to preserve the allure of the Cadillac brand, Potamkin deeply discounted the selling price, correctly forecasting that there were many more customers who wanted to move up from lesser brands who were concerned about price. He was widely successful with volumes increasing from 2,000 to 6,000 as buyers from throughout the region flocked to the Manhattan store enabling Potamkin to cover his high real estate costs and making the Manhattan store the world's largest Cadillac dealer. His wife appeared in commercials using the slogan: "If this nameplate isn't on the back of your car, you probably paid too much." In 1987, he sold the Cadillac dealership to Roger Penske who planned to return Cadillac to a less hard-charged selling methodology; Penske was not successful and Potamkin took the franchise back in 1991. He continued to expand his network of franchises: at the time of his death in 1995, Potamkin had 54 dealerships in New York, New Jersey, Pennsylvania, Georgia and Florida with $1.2 billion in sales.

==== Checker Motors ====
In March 1977, Potamkin and retired GM President Ed Cole bought into Checker Motors Corporation with the intent of re-energizing the company and developing a new, more modern Checker. With Cole as chairman and CEO of the company, the plan was to purchase partially completed Volkswagen Rabbits from VW's new Westmoreland Assembly Plant in Pennsylvania. They were going to ship the Volkswagens to the Checker Motors factory in Kalamazoo, Michigan, cut them in half, insert a section to lengthen the car, raise the roof and then sell the reconfigured vehicles as taxis. Less than 90 days after joining Checker, Cole died when his plane crashed near Kalamazoo in May 1977. In August 1977, the Checker-VW project was introduced in Road & Track magazine. The project was scrapped shortly after when it was determined that the Volkswagen was not suitable for taxi service. Potamkin eventually divested his interest in Checker Motors.

== Philanthropy ==
In 1988, he established the Potamkin Prize for Alzheimer's Research which annually awards $100,000 to the person deemed to have done the most to help in the treatment of Alzheimer's.

== Personal life ==
Potamkin was married to Luba (née Chaiken) for over 52 years; she died in 1994 of Alzheimer's disease. They had two sons, Robert and Alan, and eight grandchildren, Melissa, Jamin, Andi, Adam, Cole, Ayla, Alura, and Alex Potamkin. Potamkin died in 1995 at Mount Sinai Hospital in Miami. Memorial services were held at Temple Emanu-El in Manhattan.

Potamkin served as a manager for one of his drivers, Jersey Joe Walcott, who later became a heavyweight boxing champion. Potamkin brought singer Sergio Franchi to the United States and helped him get started in his career.
