= Brendan P. Lucey =

American chemist and biologist (born 1973)

- Born: 1977 (age 48–49); Burlington, Vermont, U.S.
- Education: University of Vermont (B.A.); Johns Hopkins University (M.D.); Washington University in St. Louis (M.S.)
- Scientific career
- Fields: Neurology, Sleep Medicine
- Workplaces: Washington University School of Medicine

Brendan P. Lucey (born 1977) is an American neurologist who is a current Professor of Neurology and Sleep Medicine Section Head at Washington University School of Medicine in St. Louis, where he is also the director of Washington University's Sleep Medicine Center.

Lucey is also known for his research on sleep and its effect on Alzheimer's disease, and his lab is currently studying the potential for sleep interventions to prevent the onset of Alzheimer's.

== Early life and education ==
Brendan Lucey was born and raised in Burlington, Vermont.

Lucey went on to receive his bachelor's (B.A.) degree from the University of Vermont in 1999, and received his M.D. at the Johns Hopkins School of Medicine in 2003.

== Academic career ==
After receiving his M.D., Lucey pursued his residency in Neurology at Washington University School of Medicine in St. Louis from 2003 to 2007, and went on to complete his fellowship in Clinical neurophysiology/Electroencephalography at Harvard Medical School in 2008.

Lucey also served as an active duty member of the United States Air Force from 2008 to 2012, and continued to pursue his Masters of Science in Clinical Investigation from Washington University in St. Louis in 2018.

Currently, Lucey is a board certified physician in Neurology, Sleep Medicine, and Clinical Neurophysiology, and serves as a Professor of Neurology at Washington University School of Medicine in St. Louis and the chief of the WashU Medicine Section of Sleep Medicine.

== Research ==
=== Seizure and sleep ===
Lucey has also contributed literature regarding the relationship between sleep in Drosophila melanogaster and seizure susceptibility. Lucey's work demonstrated that when comparing seizure prone BS flies ses^{B} and heat-sensitive sei^{TS}, there was a discrepancy of sleep pattern between the two sets of flies. Lucey's team found that while there were no alterations to sleep pattern, sleep deprivation led to increased seizure severity. Notably, administering the anti-seizure drug valproic acid mitigated this effect in sesB mutants. Furthermore, sleep deprivation during early development led to a persistent increase in seizure susceptibility into adulthood. This, along with a separate study, which indicated decreased seizure likelihood but increased seizure threshold with sleep deprivation in a different set of GEFS+ flies, indicated distinct mutational differences in the relationship between sleep and seizures.

Due to these results indicating sleep loss contributes to increased seizure frequency, Lucey's work has also been noted as a potential link between the recent research into sleep deprivation, the associated breakdown of the blood brain barrier, and seizure burden.

==== Epilepsy and sleep ====
Lucey has also researched the intersections between epilepsy, treatment methods, monitoring technologies, and other neurological conditions. His research encompasses the relationship between epileptic associations and sleep stages, as well as additional explorations into how abnormal sleep and epileptiform discharges can impact cognitive function.

His team has additionally explored how electrical status epilepticus during sleep (ESES) can occur in adults despite being usually observed in children. He has also researched differences in seizure activity between NREM and REM sleep, finding that NREM sleep is more susceptible to epileptiform discharges while REM sleep instead suppresses seizures.

Lucey has also contributed to research investigating the association between antiepileptic drugs (AEDs) and fracture risk in patients with epilepsy. His work highlighted that long term AED use, with calcium and vitamin D supplementation could increase fracture risk. He has also been involved in research evaluating the efficiency of the use of a seven-electrode montage EEG for screening in emergency scenarios.

=== Alzheimer's Disease and sleep ===
In collaboration with the Washington University Knight Alzheimer Disease Research Center (ADRC), Lucey and colleagues investigate how sleep affects different markers of Alzheimer's disease such as cognitive performance and levels of amyloid-beta and tau. Despite the low risk associated with undergoing a spinal tap, many, due to the popular belief of it being painful and invasive, many try to avoid this option. Dr. Lucey's work in non-invasive methods can alleviate concerns in AD testing. Further research interests include whether sleep quality may serve as a non-invasive marker for Alzheimer's disease progression.

Notably, Lucey's group has demonstrated that poor sleep hygiene and sleep loss are tied to an increase in amyloid-beta and tau accumulation in the brain. These proteins are detrimental for Alzheimer's patients given that amyloid-beta forms plaques while tau forms tangles inside neurons—both of these lead to cell death. Lucey and colleagues seek to further investigate medical applications of these findings through ongoing clinical trials on the insomnia medication Suvorexant, which has been found to be associated with a decrease in tau phosphorylation and amyloid-beta concentrations in the central nervous system in preliminary evaluations. These studies have been recognized through the 2024 Sleep Science Award from the American Academy of Neurology, awarded to Lucey in June 2024.

=== Schizophrenia and sleep ===
Lucey's work in the area of sleep and schizophrenia centers on NPTX2, a protein that enhances inhibitory signaling through interneurons and that is responsible for resetting synaptic connections. In patients with schizophrenia, Lucey observed a decrease of both cerebrospinal fluid and NPTX2.

His group further demonstrated how NPTX2 levels decrease during sleep activity and conversely increase during wake. The back and forth of these protein expressions create a circadian rhythm responsible for homeostasis in both humans and mice. Such insights led to the hypothesis that NPTX2 protein is a biomarker for circadian rhythmicity and could have a potential role in psychiatric symptoms observed in patients with schizophrenia.

== Awards and honors ==
2013: Physician Scientist Training Award from the American Academy of Sleep Medicine

2016: K76 Paul B. Beeson Emerging Leaders Career Development Award in Aging in 2016

2024: Sleep Science Award from the American Academy of Neurology

== See also ==
- Sleep Medicine
- Alzheimer's Disease
- Epilepsy
