= Rosa Rademakers =

Dutch neurogeneticist

Rosa Rademakers (28 June 1978, Amsterdam, The Netherlands) is a Dutch neurogeneticist and professor at the VIB-UAntwerp Center for Molecular Neuroscience. Her research centers on the genetic basis of neurodegenerative diseases, such as identifying causal genes and their function, exploring familial risk factors, and the mechanism of the degeneration. Her neurodegenerative diseases of focus include "Alzheimer's disease (AD), frontotemporal dementia (FTD) and amyotrophic lateral sclerosis (ALS)." She received a degree in Biochemistry, and a Ph.D. in Science, all from the University of Antwerp. Originally from the Netherlands, she came to the Mayo Clinic in 2005 for a post-doctoral fellowship, and in 2007 she was given a lab director position. In 2019, she moved back to Belgium to head the VIB-UAntwerp Center for Molecular Neuroscience as Scientific Director.

== Scientific research focus areas ==
Rademakers has researched mutations within genetic regulators of progranulin (GRN), which can cause early-onset dementia. She worked to develop a test to identify carriers of this mutation. This blood test identifies mutations in order to detect and understand the gene's regulation.

Her lab has also researched a mutation within the C9orf72 gene that contributes to the development of ALS and FTD. Her research discovered that this is the genetic basis for a majority of ALS and FTD cases. She received the 2016 Potamkin Prize based on this research.

Rademakers is working on research of causal genes and disease mechanisms of early-onset Alzheimer's disease. Her research team aims to sequence parts of the genome of patients with the disease in order to identify novel potential causes. She has also worked to sequence genes related to FTD.

Rademakers is also researching tau protein accumulation by whole-genome sequencing of families.

== Notable professional achievements ==
- Rademakers has filed six patents for detection and treatment of dementia
- Rademakers has been a contributing author on over 300 peer-reviewed academic journal articles
- Committee Member of the National Centralized Repository for Alzheimer's Disease and Related Dementias Executive Committee
- Mildred A. and Henry Uihlein II Professor of Medical Research at the Mayo Clinic College of Medicine

== Awards and honours ==
- 2016 – Potamkin Prize
- 2017 – Research Program Award (R35) from the National Institute of Neurological Disorders and Stroke
- 2026 – Breakthrough Prize in Life Sciences
