= Kenneth S. Kosik =

American neurologist

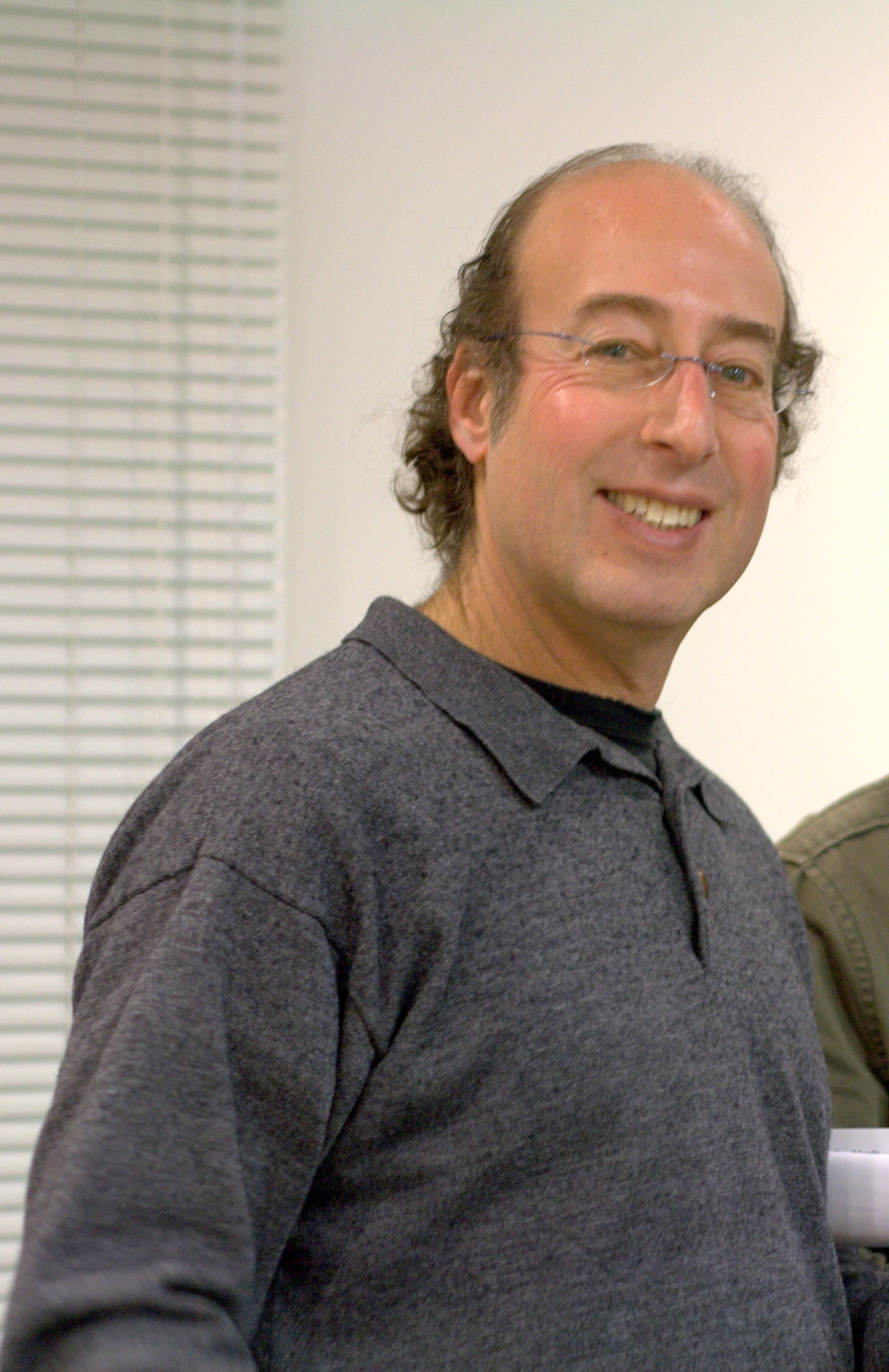
- Kosik in 2013
- Education: Medical College of Pennsylvania
- Known for: Neuroscience research
- Awards: Potamkin Prize (2021)
- Scientific career
- Doctoral advisor: Dennis J. Selkoe
- Website: https://www.mcdb.ucsb.edu/people/faculty/kenneth-kosik

Kenneth S. Kosik (born July 14, 1950) is an American neuroscientist, author, and professor whose research focuses on neural plasticity, including the molecular basis of plasticity, the evolution of synapses, and disease-related impairments of plasticity such as occurs in Alzheimer's disease.

Kenneth Kosik holds positions as Harriman Professor of Neuroscience Research and Co-Director of the Neuroscience Research Institute at the University of California. Kosik laboratory focuses on a range of topics, including stem cell biology, neurodevelopment, cerebral organoids, cellular neurobiology and neuropathology, neurophysiology, and genomics.

== Research ==
Kenneth Kosik’s research focuses on the underlying molecular basis of plasticity, particularly how protein translation at the synapse affects learning and how impairments of plasticity lead to neurodegenerative diseases. Beginning in the early nineties, Kosik contributed toward the characterization of the largest familial Alzheimer kindred in the world, a large family in Colombia with dementia onset at an early age. This began a longterm collaboration with Francisco Lopera in which the family trees were assembled, the neuropathological proof of Alzheimer’s disease obtained, the gene mutation discovered, the first brain imaging performed, and specialized neuropsychological testing devised. Kosik’s work with early onset familial Alzheimer’s disease in Colombia was the basis for a novel prevention trial to treat Alzheimer’s disease.

In 1986, Kosik was one of several groups that independently discovered Tau protein in the Alzheimer neurofibrillary tangle, followed up with many studies on the biology and pathobiology of Tau. Kosik showed the loss of polarity in tangle-bearing neurons and published the first cloning of human tau, identification of its microtubule binding domain, the first description that tau splicing was developmentally regulated, the localization of tau mRNA, and the identification of a human tau promoter. He defined a role for tau in axonal elaboration and neuronal polarity, and he discovered that the inhibition of farnesyl transferase ameliorates tau pathology in animal models.

He also discovered the receptor LRP1 is involved in tau uptake and spread, which are looked upon as the basis for target identification and drug discovery. Kosik’s research has also described how RNA moves in neurons as RNA granules called droplets that contain a distinct liquid-liquid phase separated state. Furthermore, he has identified a role for miRNAs in exit from pluripotency and discovered a set of cellular programs that harbinger a neuro-ectodermal fate. Kosik has also identified one of the earliest expression dysfunctions in Williams syndrome using induced pluripotent stem cells, and his detailed studies of delta-catenin all directly from the Kosik lab revealed a remarkable set of findings.

== Awards ==
- NASA Group Achievement Award to the Neurolab Science Team
- Potamkin Prize (2021)
- Fellow of the American Association for the Advancement of Science (2017)

== Publications ==
- Kosik, Kenneth S. (2015-12-29). Outsmarting Alzheimer's: What You Can Do to Reduce Your Risk. New York, NY: Simon and Schuster. ISBN 978-1-62145-245-4.
- Kosik, Kenneth S.; Clegg, Ellen (2010). The Alzheimer Epidemic: How Today's Care Is Failing Millions- and How We Can Do Better. Prometheus Books. ISBN 978-1-59102-728-7.
- Grollman, Earl A.; Kosik, Kenneth S. (1997-11-30). When Someone You Love Has Alzheimer's: The Caregiver's Journey. Boston: Beacon Press. ISBN 978-0-8070-2721-9.
- "Selected publications of K.S. Kosik, M.D."
