= David M. Holtzman =

American neurologist and neuroscientist

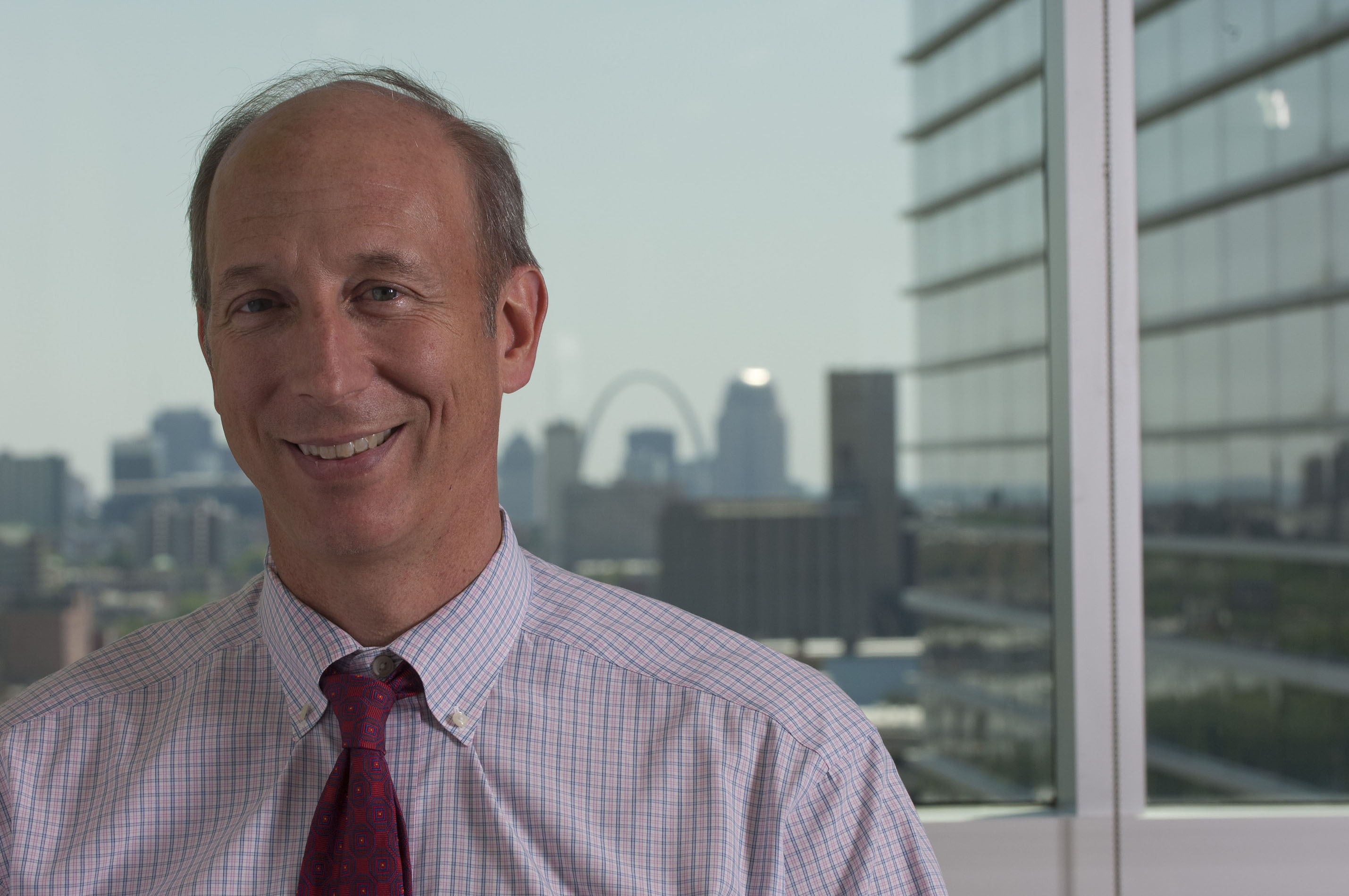
- Born: July 31, 1961 (age 65); St. Louis, Missouri, U.S.
- Education: Northwestern University; University of California, San Francisco
- Known for: Mechanisms underlying neurodegeneration, including role of apoE, amyloid beta, tau, and TREM2 in pathogenesis of Alzheimer's disease
- Awards: Potamkin Award for Alzheimer's Disease Research (2003); MetLife Award for Alzheimer's Disease Research (2006); Rainwater Prize (2021)
- Scientific career
- Fields: Neuroscience
- Institutions: Washington University School of Medicine

David M. Holtzman (born July 31, 1961) is an American neurologist and neuroscientist known for his work exploring the biological mechanisms underlying neurodegeneration, with a focus on Alzheimer's disease (AD). He is the Barbara Burton and Reuben M. Morriss III Distinguished Professor of Neurology, Scientific Director of the Hope Center for Neurological Disorders, and Director of the Knight Alzheimer's Disease Research Center at Washington University School of Medicine in St. Louis, Missouri. Holtzman served as Chair of the Department of Neurology at Washington University from 2003 to 2021. His laboratory is known for examining how apoE4 contributes to Alzheimer's disease, how sleep modulates amyloid beta in the brain, and the contributions of microglia to AD pathology.

== Early life and education ==
Holtzman was born in St. Louis, Missouri. He pursued a six-year combined Bachelor's and Medical Degree at Northwestern University in Evanston, Illinois, obtaining his Bachelor of Science in Medical Education in 1983 and his Medical Degree in 1985. He completed a residency in Neurology at the University of California, San Francisco (UCSF) from 1985 to 1989, and subsequently undertook postdoctoral research at UCSF from 1989 to 1994, initially as an instructor and then as an adjunct assistant professor in the Department of Neurology. His postdoctoral research, conducted under the mentorship of William C. Mobley, focused on developing mouse models of neonatal stroke and neurodegeneration and on the role of neurotrophins in the brain.

== Career ==
In 1994, Holtzman joined Washington University in St. Louis as an assistant professor in the Departments of Neurology and Developmental Biology. He was promoted to associate professor in 2000 and to full professor in 2002. In 2003, he was appointed Chairman of the Department of Neurology, a position he held until 2021, and in 2015 he became Scientific Director of the Hope Center for Neurological Disorders. In 2023, he was appointed Director of the Knight Alzheimer's Disease Research Center and became the Barbara Burton and Reuben M. Morriss III Distinguished Professor.

Holtzman is a co-founder of C2N Diagnostics, LLC, which he established in 2007 alongside his colleague Randall Bateman of Washington University School of Medicine and LifeTech Research, with the goal of developing diagnostic tools for neurological diseases based on the measurement of concentration and metabolism of central-nervous-system–derived biomolecules. The company has commercialized cerebrospinal fluid and plasma biomarker tests for Alzheimer's disease based on antibodies developed in the Holtzman laboratory. Over the course of his career at Washington University, Holtzman has trained more than 80 graduate students, postdoctoral fellows, and physician-scientists.

Holtzman has served in a number of scientific advisory roles, including as a member of the National Advisory Council of the National Institute on Aging (NIA) from 2017 to 2021, a member of the National Advisory Council of the National Institute of Neurological Disorders and Stroke (NINDS) from 2011 to 2015, and a member of the NIA Board of Scientific Counselors from 2023. He served as scientific chair of the Alzheimer's Disease-Related Dementias Summit convened by NINDS in 2016. He served as President of the American Neurological Association from 2017 to 2019.

== Research ==
=== ApoE and Alzheimer's disease ===
The apolipoprotein E gene (APOE) is the strongest known genetic risk factor for late-onset Alzheimer's disease. Carrying one copy of the ε4 isoform increases AD risk approximately 3.7-fold, while two copies increase risk approximately 12-fold relative to the ε3 allele; the ε2 allele is associated with reduced risk. Holtzman's laboratory has shown that apoE influences AD pathogenesis primarily through its effects on soluble Aβ clearance and aggregation, with different isoforms of apoE having differential effects on soluble Aβ clearance. More recently, the laboratory showed that apoE4, particularly as produced by astrocytes and reactive microglia, strongly exacerbates tau-mediated neurodegeneration via the brain's innate and adaptive immune system, a mechanism relevant to disease progression and to primary tauopathies.

=== Immunotherapy approaches ===
The Holtzman laboratory has investigated both anti-Aβ and anti-tau immunotherapeutic strategies. In 2001, the laboratory demonstrated that peripheral administration of an anti-Aβ antibody (m266) altered the equilibrium of Aβ across the central nervous system and blood plasma, leading to increased Aβ sequestration in plasma and reduced amyloid burden in the brain. This antibody was subsequently licensed to Eli Lilly and humanized as solanezumab, which advanced to clinical trials in mild Alzheimer's disease. The laboratory also developed anti-tau antibodies shown to block tau aggregate seeding in vitro and reduced pathology and improved cognition in animal models; one such antibody was licensed to AbbVie and progressed to phase 2 clinical trials.

More recently, the laboratory identified that a non-lipidated form of apoE is selectively present in amyloid plaques and cerebral amyloid angiopathy (CAA). An antibody targeting this form of apoE (HAE-4) was found to clear amyloid plaques and CAA and to improve CAA-associated vascular dysfunction in preclinical models.

=== Synaptic activity and amyloid-beta ===
The laboratory was among the first to demonstrate that synaptic activity directly regulates levels of soluble, monomeric Aβ in the brain interstitial fluid in vivo, specifically through synaptic vesicle release and recycling. Subsequent work showed that the regional pattern of Aβ deposition in the human brain, beginning in areas associated with the default mode network, correlates with greater metabolic and synaptic activity in those regions over a lifetime.

=== Sleep and neurodegeneration ===
The Holtzman laboratory has made advances in understanding how the sleep–wake cycle influences the metabolism of Aβ and tau in the brain. The laboratory demonstrated that levels of Aβ and tau in brain interstitial fluid and cerebrospinal fluid are higher during wakefulness and lower during sleep, and that these fluctuations are driven by differences in synaptic activity and orexin signaling. Sleep deprivation and orexin administration were found to acutely and chronically increase Aβ deposition, while pharmacological promotion of sleep and orexin receptor antagonists reduced Aβ. Once Aβ deposition occurs, the laboratory found that it disrupts sleep and further promotes Aβ aggregation in a positive feedback loop. Subsequent work demonstrated that wakefulness and sleep deprivation also regulate extracellular tau release and tau spreading, and that reduced non-rapid eye movement (NREM) slow-wave sleep is associated with increased tau pathology in humans.

=== TREM2, microglia, and tau pathology ===
Over more than a decade, the laboratory has investigated the role of microglia and specific microglial genes, particularly TREM2 and APOE, in modulating neurodegeneration in the context of both Aβ and tau pathology. The laboratory demonstrated that microglia are key effectors of Aβ-induced tau seeding and spreading in the brain, and that TREM2, apoE, and the gut microbiome influence these processes. Work from the laboratory also showed that T cell infiltration, driven by microglial signaling, contributes to neurodegeneration in tauopathy.

=== Biomarker development ===
The Holtzman laboratory developed two technical approaches that have enabled detailed study of protein metabolism in the central nervous system: a protein microdialysis method allowing measurement of proteins as frequently as every 30 minutes in the brain interstitial fluid of awake rodents and humans, and a metabolic labeling technique using stable isotope-labeled amino acids to measure rates of protein synthesis and clearance in cerebrospinal fluid and brain tissue. These methods, together with antibodies developed in the laboratory, contributed to the development of cerebrospinal fluid and plasma biomarkers for Aβ and tau, some of which are used clinically by C2N Diagnostics.

== Awards and honors ==
- 1995 Paul Beeson Physician Faculty Scholar Award, American Federation for Aging Research
- 2003 Potamkin Award for Alzheimer's Disease Research, American Academy of Neurology
- 2004 Elected member, American Society for Clinical Investigation
- 2006 MetLife Award for Alzheimer's Disease Research
- 2008 Elected member, National Academy of Medicine (then Institute of Medicine)
- 2013 Chancellor's Award for Innovation and Entrepreneurship, Washington University
- 2014 Elected Fellow, American Association for the Advancement of Science
- 2015 Carl and Gerty Cori Faculty Achievement Award, Washington University
- 2018 Elected member, National Academy of Inventors
- 2021 Rainwater Annual Prize for Outstanding Innovation in Neurodegenerative Research, Rainwater Charitable Foundation
- 2026 American Innovator Award, Bayh-Dole Coalition

== Selected publications ==
- Kang, Jae-Eun; Lim, Miranda M.; Bateman, Randall J.; Holtzman, David M. (2009). "Amyloid-beta dynamics are regulated by orexin and the sleep-wake cycle". Science. 326 (5955): 1005–1007. Bibcode:2009Sci...326.1005K. doi:10.1126/science.1180962. PMC 2789838. PMID 19779148.
- Shi, Yang; Yamada, Kaoru; Liddelow, Shane Antony; Holtzman, David M. (2017). "ApoE4 markedly exacerbates tau-mediated neurodegeneration in a mouse model of tauopathy". Nature. 549 (7673): 523–527. Bibcode:2017Natur.549..523S. doi:10.1038/nature24016. PMC 5641217. PMID 28959956.
- Holth, Jerrah K.; Fritschi, Sarah K.; Wang, Chanung; Holtzman, David M. (2019). "The sleep-wake cycle regulates brain interstitial fluid tau in mice and CSF tau in humans". Science. 363 (6429): 880–884. Bibcode:2019Sci...363..880H. doi:10.1126/science.aav2546. PMC 6410369. PMID 30679382.
