= David Snowdon =

David A. Snowdon (born 1952), is an epidemiologist and professor of neurology, formerly at the Sanders-Brown Center on Aging at the University of Kentucky. His research interests include antioxidants and aging, and the neuropathology of Alzheimer's disease, especially predictive factors in early life and the role of brain infarction.

== Career ==
He is the director of the Nun Study, a longitudinal study of aging and Alzheimer's disease which is following 678 members of the School Sisters of Notre Dame aged over 75 years. This a longitudinal study of aging and Alzheimer's disease was initiated in 1986 by Snowdon, then at the University of Minnesota. The homogeneous life style of the nuns makes them an ideal study population. Convent archives have been made available to investigators as a resource on the history of participants. The study including reviews of autobiographical essays by the nuns upon joining the order, administration of memory and cognitive tests to the nuns (some over 100 years of age), and post-mortem examination of their brains.

The study moved with Snowdon to the University of Kentucky in 1990. Many of the procedures were based on work by David Wekstein and William Markesbery. They had, in 1989, started a study of age-associated changes in cognition and function in a group of older adults in Kentucky who had agreed to brain donation at death. Their focus was to understand how changes in the brain could be linked to Alzheimer's disease and other neurological disorders in advanced age.

The Nun Study was a natural extension of the ongoing work at the Alzheimer's Disease Center at the Sanders-Brown Center on Aging. Their work continues with the help of over 1,000 older Kentuckians who volunteer to be part of this research effort.

== Publications ==
Snowdon's book on the Nun study, Aging with Grace: What the Nun Study Teaches Us About Leading Longer, Healthier, and More Meaningful Lives, won a Christopher Award in 2002.

=== Selected publications ===
- Aging with Grace: What the Nun Study Teaches Us About Leading Longer, Healthier, and More Meaningful Lives. New York : Bantam Books, 2001. ISBN 0-553-80163-5
- Snowdon DA, Nun Study (2003) Healthy aging and dementia: findings from the Nun Study. Ann Intern Med 139: 450-4
- Riley KP, Snowdon DA, Markesbery WR (2002) Alzheimer's neurofibrillary pathology and the spectrum of cognitive function: findings from the Nun Study. Ann Neurol 51: 567–77
- Gosche KM, Mortimer JA, Smith CD, Markesbery WR, Snowdon DA (2002) Hippocampal volume as an index of Alzheimer neuropathology: findings from the Nun Study. Neurology 58: 1476–82
- Snowdon DA, Greiner LH, Mortimer JA, et al. (1997) Brain infarction and the clinical expression of Alzheimer disease. The Nun Study. JAMA 277: 813–7
- Snowdon DA, Kemper SJ, Mortimer JA, et al. (1996) Linguistic ability in early life and cognitive function and Alzheimer's disease in late life: Findings from the Nun Study. JAMA 275: 528–32

== See also ==
- Gerontology
