= Religious Orders Study =

Ongoing longitudinal study of aging in nuns and monks

- Type of project: Longitudinal study
- Location: Chicago, Illinois, U.S.
- Key people: David A. Bennett
- Established: 1994
- Funding: National Institute on Aging
- Website: Religious Orders Study | Rush University

The Religious Orders Study is an ongoing longitudinal research project at the Rush Alzheimer's Disease Center to explore the effects of aging on the brain. Since the study's inception in 1994, more than 1,100 religious clergy (nuns, priests, and brothers) across the United States have participated in the study through annual psychological evaluations and postmortem brain donation.

The Religious Orders Study follows and was inspired by earlier community-based studies such as the Nun Study, Honolulu Asia Aging Study (HAAS), and Hisayama Study. Initial funding was provided by the National Institute on Aging in 1993.

The study has found that cognitive exercise including social activities and learning new skills has a protective effect on brain health and the onset of dementia, while negative psychological factors like anxiety and clinical depression are correlated with cognitive decline.
