= Giovanna Mallucci =

British neuroscientist

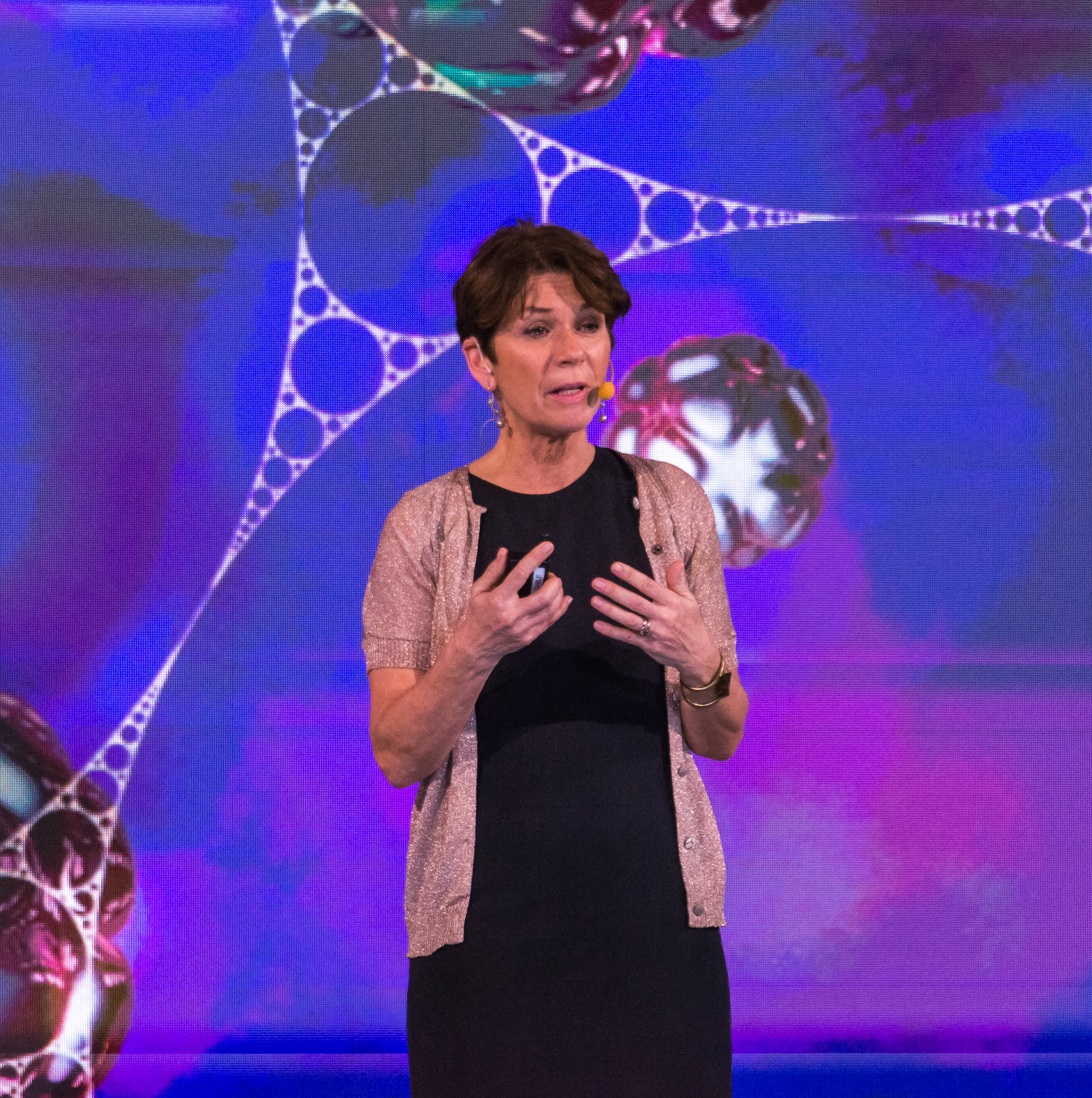
- Born: 29 June 1963 (age 63)
- Education: St Hilda's College, Oxford; University College London; Imperial College London
- Known for: mechanisms of neurogenerative diseases; translational neuroscience
- Awards: Potamkin Prize (2021)
- Scientific career
- Fields: Neuroscience; Neurodegeneration; Prion diseases
- Workplaces: University of Cambridge; University of Leicester; UK Dementia Research Institute; University of Cambridge; MRC Toxicology Unit at the University of Leicester; MRC Prion Unit at UCL
- Thesis: Prion protein gene knockout in the mouse using the Cre/1oxP system (2001)

Giovanna Mallucci is a British neuroscientist and neurologist.

She is a Founding Principal Investigator at Altos Labs, Cambridge Institute of Science, UK, since 2022, having previously been the van Geest Professor of Clinical Neurosciences (2014-2022) and Centre Director of the UK Dementia Research Institute (2017-2022) at the University of Cambridge. Prior to this she was a Programme Leader and Head of Neurobiology at the MRC Toxicology Unit, Leicester (2008 -2014) and Group Leader at the MRC Prion Unit, UCL (2001-2008). She is Honorary Professor of Molecular Neuroscience at the University of Cambridge, and a Fellow of Churchill College.

== Education ==
Mallucci attended Haberdashers' Aske's School for Girls, Elstree. Mallucci completed her undergraduate studies in Medicine at the University of Oxford, earning a BA (Hons) in Physiological Sciences in 1985, and at University College London, where she earned a MB BS (Hons) in 1988.

In 2001, she received a PhD from the University of London. . She gained specialist accreditation (CSST) in Neurology in 2005.

== Career and research ==
Mallucci is a pioneer in the biology of neurodegeneration, a field in which she has made seminal contributions, including 1) how dysregulated stress responses drive neuronal death and 2) how harnessing mechanisms governing stress responses boost neuronal resilience and synapse regeneration forneuroprotection.

These include identifying the potential for reversibility of early prion neurodegeneration leading to targeting native prion protein as a potential therapy for prevention of prion disease.

Mallucci showed how dysregulated stress responses, notably the unfolded protein response (UPR), mediate neuronal loss and contributed to the development of approaches modulating the UPR for treatment of neurodegenerative diseases, including identifying repurposable drugs, now in clinical trials. She showed that the UPR is differentially regulated within the cell to protect organelles such as mitochondria and that the mechanisms controlling this can also be exploited therapeutically.

She discovered the role of the cold-shock protein, RBM3, in synapse regeneration in hibernation and exploited this therapeutically for neuroprotection, developing strategies using ASOs (anti sense oligonucleotides) to increase its expression to prevent or reverse neurodegenerative disease.

Mallucci combined research with clinical practice and held Honorary Consultant Neurologist Positions (specialised in dementia) at the National Hospital for Neurology and Neurosurgery, Queen Square, London and Addenbrooke's Hospital, Cambridge.

== Awards ==
- Elected Doctor Honoris Causa, Sorbonne Universite 2025
- Potamkin Prize 2021
- Masland Award Medal, World Congress of Neurology 2021
- Fellow of the Academy of Medical Sciences 2017
- Frank May Medal for Excellence in Research and Outstanding Future Promise; University of Leicester, 2012
- Elected Fellow of the Royal College of Physicians, 2011
- President's Prize in Clinical Neuroscience, Royal Society of Medicine, London, 2004
- Queen Square Prize in Neurology 2003
