= Francisco Lopera =

Colombian neurologist (1951–2024)

Francisco Lopera (June 10, 1951 – September 10, 2024) was a Colombian neurologist who made major discoveries in the field of Alzheimer's. He was a professor at the University of Antioquia in Medellín. He identified the world's largest extended family with Alzheimer's which he studied for decades and identified the genetic cause of their disease. Also by his studies, he won the Potamkin Prize of 2024 of $100,000. Lopera died on September 10, 2024, at the age of 73.
