= Instituto de Assistência Médica ao Servidor Público Estadual =

Instituto de Assistência Médica ao Servidor Público Estadual (IAMSPE) (State Government Employee Medical Assistance Institute) is an economically self-sufficient governmental health system in the Brazilian State of São Paulo that attends to the health needs of state government employees, their families, and dependents. It is a huge institution, and includes the State Government Employee Hospital (Hospital do Servidor Público Estadual) "Francisco Morato de Oliveira" (HSPE-FMO) in the capital, São Paulo, inaugurated in July 1961.

It was founded in 1952 as Departamento de Assistência Médica ao Servidor Público (DAMSPE) in the State of São Paulo. In 1961, it was opened as HSPE-FMO and 1966 it became IAMSPE.

According to Brazilian laws, only government workers of São Paulo State presenting their payslips with the monthly contributions have the right to use the hospital complexes.
