= Erik Musiek =

American neurologist and chronobiologist

Erik Musiek is an American neurologist and chronobiologist. His research focuses on the molecular mechanisms of neurodegeneration, the role of circadian rhythms in Alzheimer's disease, and potential therapeutic interventions. He is the Charlotte & Paul Hagemann Professor of Neurology at Washington University in St. Louis. In addition to his research, he is also a practicing neurologist specializing in Alzheimer's Disease and has written extensively on anti-amyloid antibody therapies.

== Early life and clinical career ==
Musiek is from Hanover, New Hampshire. He completed his Bachelor of Science in Biological Psychology at the College of William & Mary in 1999. He went on to complete a PhD in Pharmacology at Vanderbilt University in 2005 and a Doctor of Medicine (M.D.) degree from Vanderbilt University in 2007. Musiek completed a residency in neurology at the University of Pennsylvania in 2011, then pursued a fellowship in Alzheimer's Disease Research at Washington University in St. Louis in 2012. As of 2014, Musiek is an assistant professor of neurology and the principal investigator at the Musiek Lab at Washington University in St. Louis. In his clinical practice, Musiek is a practicing physician specializing in treating patients with Alzheimer's Disease and other neurodegenerative diseases.

== Research and career ==
=== Research on clock genes and neurodegenerative diseases ===
Musiek and colleagues at Washington University School of Medicine in St. Louis analyzed the link between circadian clocks, sleep, and neurodegeneration using mice lacking the key clock gene, BMAL1, in the cortex and hippocampus.

The results showed disrupted rhythms of clock genes in most of the brain. The Musiek lab showed that the mice developed signs of pathology, including loss of synapses, damage from free radicals, and inflammation. Notably, there was reduced activity in genes associated with the defense against free radicals, suggesting that the increase in free radicals contributed to brain damage. Furthermore, Musiek reports that the disruption of BMAL1 leads to premature nerve cell deterioration in mice. Musiek identified that BMAL1 is important in fending off age-related brain decay by protecting the brain from free radicals that lead to oxidative stress.

As the BMAL1 knockout mice aged, their brains displayed degenerative features akin to human brain diseases, such as the accumulation of toxic proteins (e.g., β-amyloid and α-synuclein). These features were also observed when CLOCK and NPAS2 were deleted, which are circadian genes that work closely with BMAL1. Conversely, these effects do not appear after the deletion of the clock genes PER1 and PER2. Musiek discovered that astrocytes were more active in mice lacking BMAL1, as BMAL1 within astrocytes can directly control astrocyte reactivity and protein degradation. His lab also showed that another clock gene, REV-ERBα, can regulate glial activity and neuroinflammation in the brain.

=== Studies of YKL-40 in Alzheimer's Disease ===
Musiek and colleagues discovered that YKL-40, a known biomarker for Alzheimer's disease (AD), was regulated by circadian genes like BMAL1. Their research showed that knocking out the Chi3l1 gene, which encodes YKL-40, led to reduced amyloid plaque formation via increased phagocytosis by astrocytes and microglia. Mouse models prone to amyloid plaques but lacking YKL-40 exhibited lower plaque accumulation and enhanced microglial responses. Although Chi3l1 mRNA did not oscillate on a 24-hour basis, it was downregulated in BMAL1 knockout mice and upregulated in PER1 and PER2 knockouts. This suggests that the circadian regulation of YKL-40 plays a role in AD pathology, particularly in modulating glial activity and amyloid beta clearance.

=== Studies of circadian rhythm fragmentation in Alzheimer's Disease ===
Musiek and his colleague David Holtzman published a scientific review discussing how circadian rhythm disruption may influence disease progression found a diurnal oscillation of Aβ in the sleep-wake cycle. Furthermore, they discovered that sleep deprivation impairs metabolite clearance, exacerbating Aβ pathology. In a 2018 study, Musiek and colleagues examined 189 cognitively normal older adults (> 45 years old) to monitor their circadian rhythms and detect amyloid deposition via PET scans. After removing confounding variables, they identified a positive correlation between circadian irregularities and amyloid plaque accumulation.

Even with this research, there are still notable gaps in the link between circadian rhythms and AD pathogenesis. The molecular mechanisms linking sleep to known Alzheimer's biomarkers, such as amyloid plaques, are largely unknown. Musiek urged that the specific aspects of sleep most critical for Alzheimer's pathology must be targeted for therapies. Musiek also emphasized new methods for making circadian measurements, including actigraphy and home-based technologies. He hopes that these methods may be adopted after extensive validation, along with continued investigation of sleep-circadian biomarkers.

== Awards and recognition ==
Musiek is board-certified in neurology and co-Director of the Center on Biological Rhythms and Sleep. He received the Kopolow Award for Aging Research and is a member of the American Society for Clinical Investigation. He has published more than 60 peer-reviewed papers and serves on multiple NIH study sections and national advisory committees.
