= William Mobley =

American physician

William C. Mobley
- Occupation: neuroscientist

William C. Mobley is an American neuroscientist.

Mobley graduated from Lincoln, Nebraska's Pius X High School in 1966, and was named an outstanding alumni of the school in 2014. He earned a medical degree and doctorate from Stanford University, and completed a residency and fellowship at Johns Hopkins University, during which he specialized in neurology and pediatric neurology. Mobley was also associated with the Walter Reed Army Institute of Research for three years as a research neurologist. His active duty military service ended in 1985, though he remained a reservist until 1994. Mobley taught at the University of California, San Francisco until 1997, when he returned to Stanford as a faculty member. In 1999, Mobley became the first holder of the John E. Cahill Family Professorship at Stanford. In 2009, Mobley began teaching at the University of California, San Diego.

Mobley is a fellow of the Royal College of Physicians. In 2004, he was elected a member of the Institute of Medicine. Mobley was granted fellowship by the American Association for the Advancement of Science in 2006.
