= Bradley Hyman =

American academic

Bradley T Hyman
- Born: 1956 (age 69–70); Reading PA
- Education: Northwestern University; University of Iowa
- Awards: Potamkin Prize (2006); Metlife Foundation Award for Medical Research in Alzheimer's Disease (2001)
- Scientific career
- Workplaces: University of Iowa; Harvard Medical School
- Doctoral advisor: Arthur Spector
- Other academic advisors: Gary Van Hoesen, Antonio Damasio

Bradley Theodore Hyman is currently John B. Penney, Jr. Professor of Neurology at Harvard Medical School and Director of the Massachusetts Alzheimer Disease Research Center and Memory Disorder Unit at Massachusetts General Hospital. He was educated at Northwestern University (BA Chemistry, 1977) and the University of Iowa (PhD; MD). He was awarded the Metlife Foundation Award for Medical Research in Alzheimer's Disease in 2001 and the Potamkin Prize in 2006. He is a member of the National Academy of Medicine. He has authored over 700 papers related to neurodegenerative diseases, having been cited over 240,000 times. He is especially known for his work in clinical-pathological correlations and for his studies using multiphoton microscopy of models of Alzheimer's disease.
