= Rush Alzheimer's Disease Center =

Research center in Chicago, Illinois, US

- Mission: Diagnosis, treatment and prevention of Alzheimer's and other dementias
- Head: David A. Bennett, M.D., Director
- Address: 1750 West Harrison Street, Suite 1000, Chicago, IL 60612
- Location: Chicago, Illinois
- Coordinates: 41.8736016°N 87.6717202°W
- Interactive map of Rush Alzheimer's Disease Center
- Website: www.rushu.rush.edu/research/departmental-research/rush-alzheimers-disease-center

The Rush Alzheimer's Disease Center (RADC) is an independent research center located in the Medical College of Rush University Medical Center. The Rush Alzheimer's Disease Center is one of the Alzheimer's Disease Research Centers in the U.S. designated and funded by the National Institute on Aging.

The RADC was founded by Dr. James Schoenberger in 1985. Dr. David A Bennett, a neurologist, became the third RADC Director in 1998 following Dr. Jacob H Fox. From 2001–2022, Dr. Bennett also led Alzheimer's Disease Research Center (ADRC) funded by the NIA following Dr. Denis Evans who lead the ADRC from 1991–2001; this grant is now led by neuropathologist and neurologist Dr. Julie A Schneider.

The RADC is a leader in research into the causes, treatments, and prevention of Alzheimer's disease and related disorders.

One of its earliest research projects was the Religious Orders Study. The Religious Orders Study, led by Dr. Bennett, was initially funded by the National Institute on Aging in 1993. It is a study utilizing volunteers in religious communities from across the United States including priests, nuns, and brothers, who agree to annual clinical evaluation and brain donation after death, providing doctors with an opportunity to look for postmortem correlations between lifestyle and Alzheimer's disease.

The RADC's Rush Memory and Aging Project (MAP), also led by Dr. Bennett, followed in 1997. This project enrolls participants from northeastern Illinois all of whom agree to annual clinical evaluation and blood donation, and most agree to wear biomedical devices and undergo brain imaging. Notably all participants agree to donate brain, spinal cord, muscle and nerve at death.

Scientists at the RADC use the brains and other biospecimens to study a broad range of factors relating to Alzheimer's disease and other common diseases of age, and share tissue samples and data with other researchers across the globe.

Both studies are ongoing, and have created research opportunities at Rush University, including the Mediterranean-DASH Intervention for Neurodegenerative Delay MIND diet research led by the late Dr. Martha Clare Morris, the Minority Aging Research Study (MARS) led by Dr. Lisa L. Barnes who also leads the Clinical (African American) Core of the , which are studies of decline in cognitive function and risk of Alzheimer's disease in older African Americans, with brain donation after death added as an optional component, the Latino CORE led by Dr David Marquez from the University of Illinois. The RADC also has a neuroimaging Core led by MRI Physicist Dr. Konstantinos Arfanakis.

While maintaining cognitive function is the number one priority of most older persons, their second concern is loss of mobility. Thus, Dr. Aron Buchman leads a portfolio of studies on motor function that incorporate a variety of biomedical devices worn in the home.

In addition to a focus on the treatment and prevention of common chronic diseases of older persons, the RADC also has a portfolio of work on health and financial decision making and susceptibly to scams and fraud led by Dr. Patricia Boyle.

More recently the RADC established the Pathology Alzheimer's Disease and Related Disorders Study (PARDoS) in Sao Paulo Brazil led by Dr. Bennett at the RADC and Dr. Jose Farfel at the RADC and the Instituto de Assistência Médica ao Servidor Público Estadual (IAMSPE). The study collects brains and other organs from Blacks, Mixed and White decedents age 18+ from IAMSPE and the Santo Andre and Guarulhos autopsy services in the southwest and northwest suburbs of Sao Paulo.

The RADC also has a Sequencing Core and Human Cell Modeling Group led by neurologist and stem cell biologist Dr. Yanling Wang.

The Rush Memory Clinic is a tertiary care referral clinic for the evaluation of patients for possible dementia. Dr. Zoe Arvanitakis is the Clinical Director.

The RADC also conducts a wide range of clinical trials and other patient oriented research for the treatment and prevention of dementia, and for other conditions of aging.

The RADC also sponsors an array of community outreach and education programs.
