= William Seeley (neurologist) =

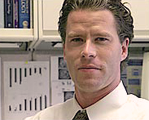
- Seeley in 2007
- Education: Brown University; University of California, San Francisco
- Occupation: Neurologist
- Awards: MacArthur Fellowship

William W. Seeley (born 1971) is an American neurologist. He is a Professor of Neurology and Pathology at the UCSF Memory and Aging Center at the University of California, San Francisco (UCSF). He leads the Selective Vulnerability Research Lab at UCSF. He is a 2011 MacArthur Fellow.

== Life ==
Seeley graduated from Brown University in 1994, and from the UCSF School of Medicine. He was an internal medicine intern at UCSF and a neurology resident at the Massachusetts General Hospital and Brigham and Women's Hospital.

He is on the editorial board of Acta Neuropathologica and Neuroimage Clinical. He is also Director of the UCSF Neurodegenerative Disease Brain Bank. His research concerns regional vulnerability in neurodegenerative disease such as frontotemporal dementia and Alzheimer's disease.

== Works ==
- William W. Seeley; Virginia E. Sturm (2007). "Self-Representation and the Frontal Lobes". In Bruce L. Miller; Jeffrey L. Cummings (eds.). The human frontal lobes: functions and disorders (2 ed.). Guilford Press. ISBN 978-1-59385-329-7.
- Panteleimon Giannakopoulos; Patrick R. Hof, eds. (2009). "Frontotemporal Demetia Neuroimaging: A Guide for Clinicians". Dementia in clinical practice. Karger Publishers. ISBN 978-3-8055-9015-0.
