= American Academy of Neurology =

American medical association

American Academy of Neurology American Academy of Neurology
- Abbreviation: AAN
- Formation: 1948; 78 years ago
- Type: Learned society and professional association
- Headquarters: Minneapolis, Minnesota, U.S.
- Location: 201 Chicago Avenue, Minneapolis, Minnesota, U.S.
- Official language: English
- President: Natalia S. Rost, MD, MPH, FAAN, FAHA
- President Elect: Lyell K. Jones, Jr., MD, FAAN
- CEO: Mary E. Post, MBA, CEA
- Website: aan.com

The American Academy of Neurology (AAN) is a professional society representing over 44,000 neurologists and neuroscientists. As a medical specialty society it was established in 1948 by A.B. Baker of the University of Minnesota to advance the art and science of neurology, and thereby promote the best possible care for patients with neurological disorders. It is headquartered in Minneapolis and maintains a health policy office in Washington, D.C.

In April 2012, the Academy relocated its headquarters to a new 63,000-square-foot building in downtown Minneapolis. The five-story facility cost $20 million to build.

== Activities ==
The annual meeting of the AAN is attended by more than 15,000 neurologists and neuroscientists from the US and abroad. The American Academy of Neurology has formal policies for avoiding conflicts of interest with pharmaceutical and device industries, and meets or exceeds all recommendations of the Council of Medical Specialty Societies Code.

The journal, Neurology, is the official journal of the AAN. It is a peer-reviewed medical journal which is also referred to colloquially as the "Green Journal" and is published by Wolters-Kluwer. The AAN publishes the bimonthly magazine Brain&Life.

It also awards, in association with the American Brain Foundation, the Potamkin Prize.

Launched in 2003, Neurology on the Hill is an annual event in Washington, D.C., during which neurologists meet with members of congress to advocate on behalf of policies and legislation that have a direct impact on the delivery of neurological care.

=== Top five Choosing Wisely recommendations ===
The AAN partnered with the American Board of Internal Medicine Foundation and Consumer Reports to provide their top 5 recommendations for neurologists. Out of 178 nominations from AAN members, these 5 guidelines were selected by a panel of 4 AAN Staff and 10 experienced AAN members who voted according to a modified Delphi method. The guidelines were published in Neurology on February 20, 2013.

1. Don't perform EEGs for headaches.
2. Don't perform imaging of the carotid arteries for simple syncope without other neurologic symptoms.
3. Don't use opioid or butalbital treatment for migraine except as a last resort.
4. Don't prescribe interferon-beta or glatiramer acetate to patients with disability from progressive, non-relapsing forms of multiple sclerosis.
5. Disrecommend for asymptomatic carotid stenosis unless the complication rate is low (<3%).

== See also ==
- Potamkin Prize
