= Richard G. Morris =

British neuroscientist

Richard G.M. Morris CBE FRS FRSE
- Born: Richard Graham Michael Morris; 27 June 1948 (age 78)
- Education: Trinity Hall, Cambridge (BA); University of Sussex (D.Phil.)
- Known for: Morris water navigation task
- Scientific career
- Awards: 2016 Brain Prize
- Fields: Neuroscience
- Workplaces: University of Edinburgh

Richard Graham Michael Morris, CBE FRS FRSE (born 27 June 1948), is a British neuroscientist. He is known for developing the Morris water navigation task, for proposing the concept of synaptic tagging (along with Julietta U. Frey (formerly published under Uwe Frey), and for his work on the function of the hippocampus.

He is the director of the Centre for Cognitive and Neural Systems (Edinburgh) and the Wolfson Professor of Neuroscience at the University of Edinburgh. Since 1994 he has been a fellow of the Royal Society of Edinburgh and since 1997, he has been a fellow of the Royal Society. Morris was appointed a Commander of the Order of the British Empire in 2007.

Morris, together with Tim Bliss (Francis Crick Institute) and Graham Collingridge (University of Bristol) were named as winners of the 2016 Brain Prize for their discoveries about the way synaptic connections in the hippocampus are strengthened by stimulation. The process, known as long-term potentiation (LTP), forms the basis of the ability to learn and to remember.

He was elected Member of the National Academy of Sciences in April 2020.

== Education ==
Morris received his BA in natural science from Trinity Hall, Cambridge and D.Phil. from the University of Sussex in 1973. He was a lecturer at the University of St Andrews from 1977 to 1986 where he developed the Morris water navigation task. He moved to the University of Edinburgh in 1986.
