= Media event =

Event created for publicity

A media event, also known as a pseudo-event, is an event, activity, or experience conducted for the purpose of creating media publicity. It may also be any event that is covered in the mass media or was hosted largely with the media in mind.

== Etymology and definition ==
In media studies, "media event" is an established theoretical term first developed by Elihu Katz and Daniel Dayan in the 1992 book Media Events: The Live Broadcasting of History. Media events in this sense are ceremonial events with narrative progression that are live broadcast and gather a large segment of the population, such as royal weddings or funerals. The defining characteristics of a media event are that it is immediate (i.e., it is broadcast live), organized by a non-media entity, containing ceremonial and dramatic value, preplanning, and focusing on a personality, whether that be a single person or a group. The 2009 book Media Events in a Global Age updates the concept. The theory of media events has also been applied to social media, for instance in an analysis of tweets about the Swedish elections or an analysis of the Bernie Sanders mittens meme during the inauguration of Joe Biden. For example in the instance of the Bernie Sanders meme event, Anne Jerslev argues that it constituted a user-generated media event.

Media events may center on a news announcement, an anniversary, a news conference, or planned events like speeches or demonstrations. Instead of paying for advertising time, a media or pseudo-event seeks to use public relations to gain media and public attention. The theorist Marshal McLuhan has stated that the pseudo-event has been viewed as an event that is separate from reality and is to simply satisfy our need for constant excitement and interest in pop culture. These events are, “planned, planted, or incited (Merrin, 2002)” solely to be reproduced later again and again.

The term "pseudo-event" was coined by the theorist and historian Daniel J. Boorstin in his 1961 book The Image: A Guide to Pseudo-events in America: “The celebration is held, photographs are taken, the occasion is widely reported.” The term is closely related to idea of hyperreality and thus postmodernism, although Boorstin's coinage predates the two ideas and related work of postmodern thinkers such as Jean Baudrillard. A media event being a kind of planned event, it may be called inauthentic in contrast to a spontaneous one.

In distinguishing between a pseudo-event and a spontaneous one, Boorstin states characteristics of a pseudo-event in his book titled "Hidden History." He says that a pseudo-event is: dramatic, repeatable, costly, intellectually planned, and social. It causes other pseudo-events, and one must know about it to be considered "informed".

== Types ==
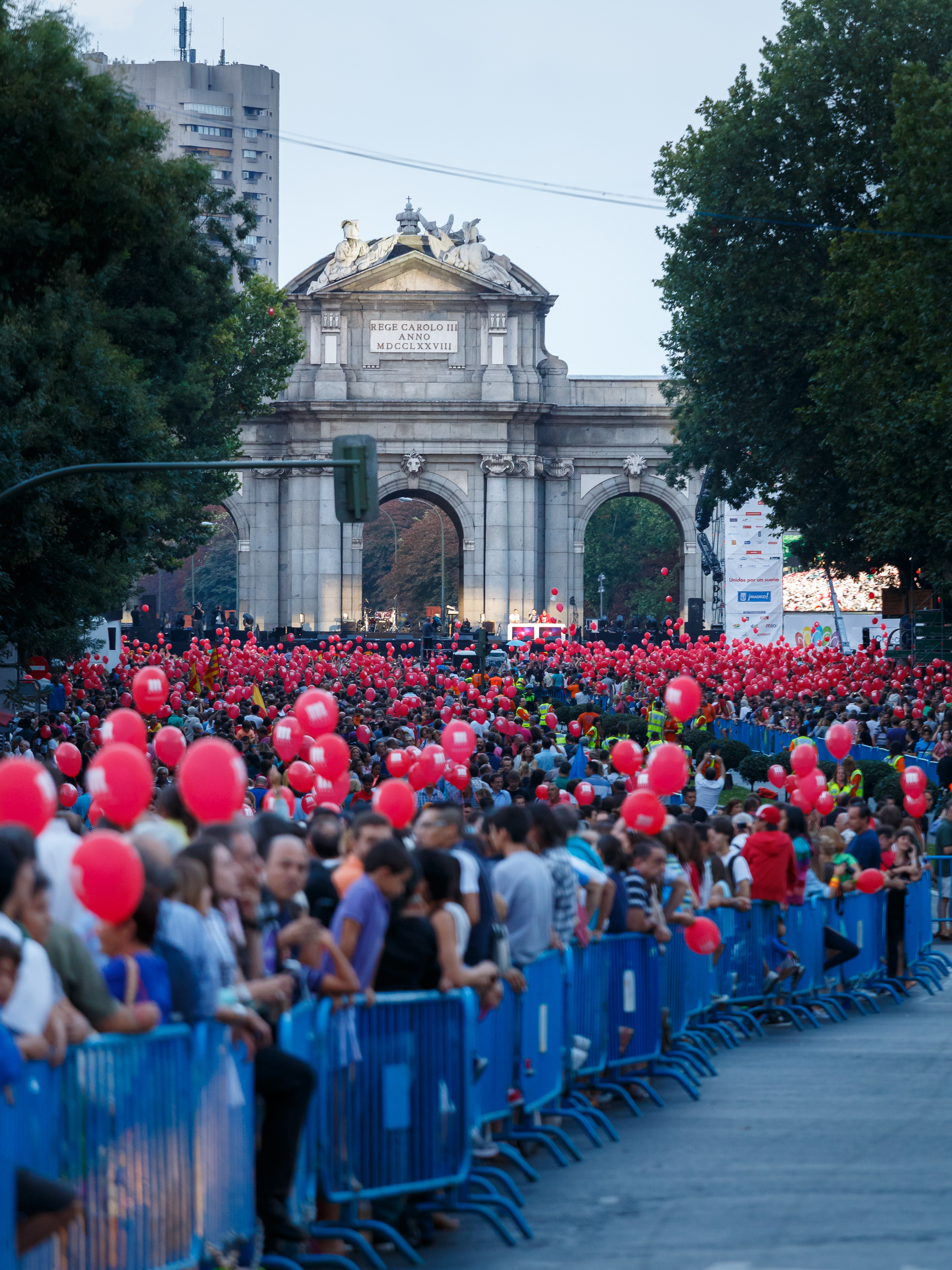
Madrid sends its bid for the 2020 Summer Olympics

- Press conference: A news conference is often held when an organization wants members of the press to get an announcement simultaneously. The in-person events may include interviews, questioning, and show-and-tell. These conferences often provide little information about the topic or don't reach a clear consensus. Media events like news conferences can come to be expected, especially before, during, and after sporting events, and the National Football League demands that its players provide a weekly media event by taking postgame questions from reporters. When Seattle Seahawks running back Marshawn Lynch dressed and left the stadium after a loss on Nov. 16, 2014, the NFL fined him $100,000.
- Political: Political conventions, planned presentations or speeches about company earnings or political issues, are a form of media event.
- Celebrity events: Award ceremonies, red carpet events and celebrity photo opportunities are all considered a type of media event, where the event is orchestrated for the purpose of introducing a chosen narrative into the media.
- Sex tapes: When created with the intention of being "leaked" is a form of a pseudo-event because its purpose is to generate media attention.
- Protests and charity events: They may be planned almost exclusively for the purpose of getting media attention for an issue or cause.

== Historic examples ==
Media events became prominent when the media did. The driving of the Golden Spike in Promontory Summit, Utah, in 1869 has been described as one of the first media events in the United States. Edward Bernays and his Torches of Freedom campaign in 1929 is an example of an early media event that successfully influenced public opinion. Similarly, Nikita Khrushchev's visit to the United States in 1959 was highly influential, and has been cited as the first example of media events being utilized in politics.

Media events became practical in the middle 19th century as the Morse telegraph and the expansion of daily newspapers introduced same-day news cycles. The emergence of the internet led to many media stories being published live from the media event, real-time Twitter coverage, and immediate analysis of televised media events. When musical artist Prince pretended to take questions during his Super Bowl press conference but instead broke immediately into song, his performance itself became a meta media-event-within-a-media-event.

From a postmodern perspective, Jean Baudrillard argued in his essay The Gulf War Did Not Take Place that the Gulf War, the first war broadcast on television, was not a real war, but a media event planned by the US army and media outlets like CNN.

== Authenticity of events ==
These events are used by public relations professionals to satisfy journalists’ interests and needs so they can create a great story that makes an impact on the public. Examples include politicians taking photos with citizens to boost their likeability and press conferences. Though this is very common, using this media technique has been criticized for not producing authentic material, which is seen as stylistic instead of substantial informational. The public relations industry targets all sectors, not just government, with pseudo-events on behalf of representing and maintaining their clients’ interests and image. This can bring into question if some of the media put out is actually true news and can be relied on, especially since serious topics are talked about using this technique.

=== Tourism authenticity ===
The tourism industry is subject to pseudo-events that are often unnoticed to the average tourist themselves. Every country may have specific sites, attractions, and things to do for a tourist so they can experience what life is like in that country or at least be introduced to the culture. The locals know that these attractions aren't always a true reflection of life in that country, but rather a hyperreality to satisfy the desire to see the real thing. Tourists are in search for the authenticity when visiting but these events that appear as one thing are not truly authentic; it is a symbol.

In a postmodern perspective, tourists can enjoy these staged attractions and activities to get a more realistic experience. Examples include taking photos with a character or actor who plays the part of an authentic local or buying souvenirs at a market. Some tourists don't notice these events because they are made to distract from everyday life.

=== Celebrities ===
Boorstin has viewed celebrities as ‘human pseudo-events’, specifically in American culture thought history, since the 1800s. Celebrities have an image that represents an ideal life, an elite status and persona that is separate from everyday life. They are seen as glamorous but with a distance from the public sphere. There are some celebrities that portray a life that seems unattainable by many, then there are celebrities who are famous for actual achievements. Examples of pseudo-events created by celebrities range from anything from signing autographs, making public appearances, holding an exclusive event, or doing projects with charities.

=== Non-scientific internet polls and news ===
Non-scientific internet polls have been increasingly popular as a conversational tool on websites and major news outlets. This method is used to invite participants to take a survey, which can generate thousands of responses or more. These polls are self-selected and can be used to drive more traffic to the website, which can cause the need for more news and generate more revenue. The large volume of responses can improve the image that is being reported rather than the news content itself. Participants can believe that their participation in these polls can contribute to the reported online survey's topic. Jack Fuller, President of Tribune Publishing Company, has touched on this topic and how this form of gathering information for non-scientific reasons can be inauthentic. The use of these online polls as news content can place scientific polls used for research to be equally as legitimate when that is often not the case. Boorstin has noted that these pseudo-events' main goals are meeting increased demands for more news and revenue generation.

=== War coverages ===
Since 1991 when Baudrillard made the bold claim that "The Gulf War Did Not Take Place", the authenticity of war coverages has long been debated. Similar claims have also been made on the Russo-Ukrainian War, which broke out against the backdrop of a much more post-modernized society in which anyone can create their own news and "realities".

== See also ==
- Corporate anniversary
- Media circus
- Earned media
- Catch and kill
- Agenda-setting theory
- Reputation management
- Hyperreality
- Mass media
- Post-truth
- Publicity
- The medium is the message

== Additional sources ==
- Bösch, Frank: European Media Events, European History Online, Mainz: Institute of European History, 2010, retrieved: June 13, 2012.
- Daniel Dayan and Elihu Katz, Media Events: The Live Broadcasting of History (Cambridge: Harvard University Press, 1992)
- Evans. (2018). Media events in contexts of transition: sites of hope, disruption and protest. Media, Culture & Society, 40(1), 139–142. https://doi.org/10.1177/0163443717726012
- Strand, Forssberg, H., Klingberg, T., & Norrelgen, F. (2008). Phonological working memory with auditory presentation of pseudo-words — An event related fMRI Study. Brain Research, 1212(30 May), 48–54. https://doi.org/10.1016/j.brainres.2008.02.097
- Morgan. (2011). Celebrity: Academic “Pseudo-Event” or a Useful Concept for Historians? Cultural and Social History, 8(1), 95–114. https://doi.org/10.2752/147800411X12858412044474
