= Arthur Konnerth =

German academic

- Born: 23 September 1953
- Education: LMU Munich (M.D.), Max Planck Institute of Psychiatry (Ph.D.)
- Scientific career
- Fields: Neuroscience
- Workplaces: Technical University of Munich

Arthur Konnerth (born 23 September 1953) is a German neurophysiologist and neuroscientist, the Hertie Senior Professor of Neuroscience at the Technical University of Munich.

== Academic career ==
Konnerth received a degree in medicine from LMU Munich and a Ph.D. from the Max Planck Institute of Psychiatry. He completed his habilitation at TUM in 1987. He has been a professor at the University of Saarland, TUM, and LMU. He has been a full professor at TUM and the director of its Institute of Neuroscience since 2005, and has held the Hertie professorship since 2017.

Konnerth was elected to the German Academy of Sciences Leopoldina in 2002, the Academia Europaea in 2004, and the Bavarian Academy of Sciences in 2011. He received the Gottfried Wilhelm Leibniz Prize in 2001. In 2015, he was the co-recipient of The Brain Prize along with Winfried Denk, Karel Svoboda, and David W. Tank, cited for their contributions to two-photon microscopy to visualize brain tissues and neurons.

Konnerth's research continues to focus on development of imaging technology, as well as understanding behavior-related synaptic signaling in well-defined neural circuits.
