= Hans Forssberg =

Swedish neuroscientist and pediatrician

Hans Forssberg is a Swedish neuroscientist, child neurologist and professor emeritus at Karolinska Institute, Stockholm, Sweden. His research has focused on the development and neural control of movement, neuroplasticity and neurodevelopmental disorders, and later on cerebral palsy and childhood disability in low- and middle-income countries.

Forssberg received his doctoral degree in 1979 and combined neuroscience research with clinical work in neuropaediatrics. He became head of the children's clinic at Karolinska Hospital in 1993 and professor at Karolinska Institute in 1995. He has held senior academic and international roles, including dean and vice president of Karolinska Institutet, director of the Stockholm Brain Institute and director of Karolinska Institutet's Strategic Research Program in Neuroscience, chair of the European Academy of Childhood Disability, and president of the International Alliance of Academies of Childhood Disability. He has also served as an expert advisor for a UNICEF project on early detection and intervention for children with developmental disabilities in low- and middle-income countries. He was a member of the Nobel Assembly at Karolinska Institutet and participated in Nobel Committee work.

== Research ==
=== Locomotion and postural control ===
Forssberg began his research in motor control as a doctoral student of Sten Grillner, studying the spinal mechanisms that generate and regulate locomotion. Experiments in spinal animals showed that neural circuits within the spinal cord, isolated from supraspinal centres, could generate a detailed locomotor pattern, including coordinated activity within and between the limbs. His early experiments also demonstrated that sensory reflexes are modulated according to the phase of the locomotor cycle, including phase-dependent stumbling corrective reactions. He later extended this research to human motor development, describing the transformation from infant stepping towards mature plantigrade gait and independent walking. With Lewis Nashner, he studied the development of postural control and the adaptive use of somatosensory, visual and vestibular information during childhood; the study was later described as seminal to research on multisensory integration in postural development.

=== Fine motor development ===
With Ann-Christin Eliasson, Andrew Gordon, Roland Johansson and other collaborators, Forssberg studied how predictive control of fingertip forces develops in childhood. Instrumented-object experiments showed a gradual transition from feedback-dominated control in young children towards anticipatory coordination of grip and load forces. Children increasingly learned to use prior information about an object's weight, size and surface properties to predict the forces required for a lift. Related work characterized impaired predictive fingertip-force control in children with cerebral palsy.

=== Cortical motor control and brain plasticity ===
Research with Henrik Ehrsson and colleagues used functional neuroimaging to investigate the cortical organization of skilled hand movements. A comparison of precision and power grips showed broader recruitment of premotor, parietal, cingulate and prefrontal networks during precision grip, supporting a distributed cortical control of fine finger manipulation.

With Torkel Klingberg and colleagues, Forssberg investigated the plasticity of working memory. Early adaptive computerized-training studies contributed to subsequent research on cognitive training. Later meta-analyses supported improvements on trained and closely related working-memory tasks. A 2009 Science study reported changes in cortical dopamine D1-receptor binding after working-memory training, linking cognitive training to neural plasticity.

With Fredrik Ullén and colleagues, Forssberg studied motor learning and musical expertise. A 2005 Nature Neuroscience study of professional pianists found associations between the amount of piano practice during different developmental periods and the organization of specific white-matter tracts. The study has been described as a landmark paper linking training to human white-matter plasticity.

=== Microbiota and early brain development ===
With Rochellys Diaz Heijtz and colleagues, Forssberg participated in studies of the influence of the gut microbiota on early brain development. A 2011 Proceedings of the National Academy of Sciences study using germ-free mice found that microbial colonization early in life influenced later behaviour, brain neurochemistry and gene expression. Subsequent collaborative work examined potential molecular mechanisms involved in communication between the gut microbiota and the developing brain, suggesting a possible role for peptidoglycan signalling in microbiota–gut–brain communication during development. These studies were subsequently discussed in reviews of the microbiota–gut–brain axis and neurodevelopment.

=== Cerebral palsy in Uganda ===
In later research Forssberg increasingly focused on childhood disability in low- and middle-income countries. With Ugandan child neurologist Angelina Kakooza-Mwesige, whose doctoral thesis he supervised, he developed a collaborative research program on children with cerebral palsy in rural Uganda. A 2017 population-based The Lancet Global Health study screened more than 31,000 children in rural eastern Uganda and reported a higher cerebral-palsy prevalence than that reported from high-income countries, with a different epidemiological pattern, including few identified children born preterm. The lower prevalence among older children suggested high premature mortality among severely affected children. An accompanying The Lancet Global Health commentary emphasized the importance of large population-based studies from low-income settings. Subsequent studies examined mortality, nutrition, functional development, participation and access to health care and education.

The research programme later expanded to intervention and the team developed the Akwenda Intervention Program, a community-based multidisciplinary intervention evaluated in a cluster-randomized trial in rural Uganda showing improvements in functioning, activity and participation among children and improved psychosocial functioning among caregivers.

== Global childhood disability and international roles ==
Forssberg chaired the European Academy of Childhood Disability from 2008 to 2014. Together with Diane Damiano and Robert Armstrong he founded the International Alliance of Academies of Childhood Disability, and served as its first president. The alliance links professional organizations working with childhood disability internationally and supports the establishment of new professional academies in low- and middle-income countries. His later global health work also included UNICEF projects on early identification, intervention and inclusion for children with developmental delay and disability in low- and middle-income countries.

== Nobel Committee service ==
Forssberg was a member of the Nobel Assembly at Karolinska Institutet from 2005 to 2016 and served as an adjunct member of the Nobel Committee for Physiology or Medicine. Together with Ole Kiehn, he authored the advanced scientific background for the 2014 Nobel Prize in Physiology or Medicine, on the brain's place- and grid-cell navigation system. He also delivered the presentation speech for the 2015 Nobel Prize in Physiology or Medicine, which recognized discoveries of treatments for malaria and parasitic roundworm infections—diseases affecting hundreds of millions of people, particularly in the world's poorest populations.
