= The Brain Prize =

- Awarded for: The Brain Prize is awarded to one or more scientists who have distinguished themselves by an outstanding contribution to neuroscience and who are still active in research. The Prize is global.
- Country: Denmark
- Presented by: A Royal Highness and the Chairman of the board
- Reward: DKK 10 million
- First award: 2011
- Website: www.lundbeckfonden.com/thebrainprize/

The Brain Prize, formerly known as The Grete Lundbeck European Brain Research Prize, is an international scientific award honouring "one or more scientists who have distinguished themselves by an outstanding contribution to neuroscience and who are still active in research". Founded in 2011 by the Lundbeck Foundation, the prize is associated with a DKK 10 million award to the nominees, the world’s largest brain research prize.

Nominees can be of any nationality. Prize winners are expected to interact with Danish brain researchers e.g. through lectures, master classes, seminars, exchange programmes for researchers or other activities agreed with and financially supported by the Lundbeck Foundation.

== History ==
The Brain Prize was established by the Lundbeck Foundation in 2010 as a European prize and was awarded for the first time in 2011. Today the Prize is global.

== Selection committee ==
As of 2024, the selection committee for the prize consisted of:

- Andreas Meyer-Lindenberg (chair) - Germany
- Carmen Sandi (vice chair) - Switzerland
- Eunjoon Kim - Korea
- Gina Turrigiano - USA
- Katrin Amunts - Germany
- Ole Kiehn - Denmark
- Ole Petter Ottersen - Norway
- Pamela Shaw - United Kingdom
- Sabine Kastner - USA
- Samuel Berkovic - Australia

== Laureates ==
- Source: Lundbeck Foundation

Year	Laureates	Country	Citation
2011	Péter Somogyi	(Hungary) / (United Kingdom)	”For their wide-ranging, technically and conceptually brilliant research on the functional organization of neuronal circuits in the cerebral cortex, especially in the hippo¬campus, a region that is crucial for certain forms of memory"
2011	Tamás Freund	(Hungary)	”For their wide-ranging, technically and conceptually brilliant research on the functional organization of neuronal circuits in the cerebral cortex, especially in the hippo¬campus, a region that is crucial for certain forms of memory"
2011	György Buzsáki	(Hungary) / (United States)	”For their wide-ranging, technically and conceptually brilliant research on the functional organization of neuronal circuits in the cerebral cortex, especially in the hippo¬campus, a region that is crucial for certain forms of memory"
2012	Christine Petit	(France)	"For their unique, world-leading contributions to our understanding of the genetic regulation of the development and functioning of the ear, and for elucidating the causes of many of the hundreds of inherited forms of deafness"
2012	Karen Steel	(United Kingdom)	"For their unique, world-leading contributions to our understanding of the genetic regulation of the development and functioning of the ear, and for elucidating the causes of many of the hundreds of inherited forms of deafness"
2013	Ernst Bamberg	(Germany)	"For their invention and refinement of optogenetics. This revolutionary technique allows genetically specified populations of neurons to be turned on or off with light, offering not only the ability to elucidate the characteristics of normal and abnormal neural circuitry but also new approaches to treatment of brain disorders"
2013	Edward Boyden	(United States)	"For their invention and refinement of optogenetics. This revolutionary technique allows genetically specified populations of neurons to be turned on or off with light, offering not only the ability to elucidate the characteristics of normal and abnormal neural circuitry but also new approaches to treatment of brain disorders"
2013	Karl Deisseroth	(United States)	"For their invention and refinement of optogenetics. This revolutionary technique allows genetically specified populations of neurons to be turned on or off with light, offering not only the ability to elucidate the characteristics of normal and abnormal neural circuitry but also new approaches to treatment of brain disorders"
2013	Peter Hegemann	(Germany)	"For their invention and refinement of optogenetics. This revolutionary technique allows genetically specified populations of neurons to be turned on or off with light, offering not only the ability to elucidate the characteristics of normal and abnormal neural circuitry but also new approaches to treatment of brain disorders"
2013	Gero Miesenböck	(Austria)	"For their invention and refinement of optogenetics. This revolutionary technique allows genetically specified populations of neurons to be turned on or off with light, offering not only the ability to elucidate the characteristics of normal and abnormal neural circuitry but also new approaches to treatment of brain disorders"
2013	Georg Nagel	(Germany)	"For their invention and refinement of optogenetics. This revolutionary technique allows genetically specified populations of neurons to be turned on or off with light, offering not only the ability to elucidate the characteristics of normal and abnormal neural circuitry but also new approaches to treatment of brain disorders"
2014	Giacomo Rizzolatti	(Italy)	"For their pioneering research on higher brain mechanisms underpinning such complex human functions as literacy, numeracy, motivated behaviour and social cognition, and for their efforts to understand cognitive and behavioural disorders"
2014	Stanislas Dehaene	(France)	"For their pioneering research on higher brain mechanisms underpinning such complex human functions as literacy, numeracy, motivated behaviour and social cognition, and for their efforts to understand cognitive and behavioural disorders"
2014	Trevor W. Robbins	(United Kingdom)	"For their pioneering research on higher brain mechanisms underpinning such complex human functions as literacy, numeracy, motivated behaviour and social cognition, and for their efforts to understand cognitive and behavioural disorders"
2015	Winfried Denk	(Germany)	"For invention, refinement and use of two-photon microscopy to provide detailed, dynamic images of activity in individual nerve cells, dendrites and synapses, thereby transforming the study of development, plasticity and functional circuitry of the brain"
2015	Arthur Konnerth	(Germany)	"For invention, refinement and use of two-photon microscopy to provide detailed, dynamic images of activity in individual nerve cells, dendrites and synapses, thereby transforming the study of development, plasticity and functional circuitry of the brain"
2015	Karel Svoboda	(United States)	"For invention, refinement and use of two-photon microscopy to provide detailed, dynamic images of activity in individual nerve cells, dendrites and synapses, thereby transforming the study of development, plasticity and functional circuitry of the brain"
2015	David W. Tank	(United States)	"For invention, refinement and use of two-photon microscopy to provide detailed, dynamic images of activity in individual nerve cells, dendrites and synapses, thereby transforming the study of development, plasticity and functional circuitry of the brain"
2016	Timothy Bliss	(United Kingdom)	"For their ground-breaking research on the cellular and molecular basis of Long-Term Potentiation and the demonstration that this form of synaptic plasticity underpins spatial memory and learning"
2016	Graham Collingridge	(United Kingdom)	"For their ground-breaking research on the cellular and molecular basis of Long-Term Potentiation and the demonstration that this form of synaptic plasticity underpins spatial memory and learning"
2016	Richard G. Morris	(United Kingdom)	"For their ground-breaking research on the cellular and molecular basis of Long-Term Potentiation and the demonstration that this form of synaptic plasticity underpins spatial memory and learning"
2017	Wolfram Schultz	(Germany)	"For their multidisciplinary analysis of brain mechanisms that link learning to reward, which has far-reaching implications for the understanding of human behaviour, including disorders of decision-making in conditions such as gambling, drug addiction, compulsive behaviour and schizophrenia"
2017	Peter Dayan	(United Kingdom)	"For their multidisciplinary analysis of brain mechanisms that link learning to reward, which has far-reaching implications for the understanding of human behaviour, including disorders of decision-making in conditions such as gambling, drug addiction, compulsive behaviour and schizophrenia"
2017	Ray Dolan	(Republic of Ireland)	"For their multidisciplinary analysis of brain mechanisms that link learning to reward, which has far-reaching implications for the understanding of human behaviour, including disorders of decision-making in conditions such as gambling, drug addiction, compulsive behaviour and schizophrenia"
2018	Bart De Strooper	(Belgium)	"For their groundbreaking research on the genetic and molecular basis of Alzheimer’s disease, with far-reaching implications for the development of new therapeutic interventions as well as for the understanding of other neurodegenerative diseases of the brain'"
2018	Michel Goedert	(Luxembourg)	"For their groundbreaking research on the genetic and molecular basis of Alzheimer’s disease, with far-reaching implications for the development of new therapeutic interventions as well as for the understanding of other neurodegenerative diseases of the brain'"
2018	Christian Haass	(Germany)	"For their groundbreaking research on the genetic and molecular basis of Alzheimer’s disease, with far-reaching implications for the development of new therapeutic interventions as well as for the understanding of other neurodegenerative diseases of the brain'"
2018	John Hardy	(United Kingdom)	"For their groundbreaking research on the genetic and molecular basis of Alzheimer’s disease, with far-reaching implications for the development of new therapeutic interventions as well as for the understanding of other neurodegenerative diseases of the brain'"
2019	Marie-Germaine Bousser	(France)	"for more than 30 years spent describing, understanding and diagnosing the most common inherited form of stroke, CADASIL"
2019	Hugues Chabriat	(France)	"for more than 30 years spent describing, understanding and diagnosing the most common inherited form of stroke, CADASIL"
2019	Anne Joutel	(France)	"for more than 30 years spent describing, understanding and diagnosing the most common inherited form of stroke, CADASIL"
2019	Elisabeth Tournier-Lasserve	(France)	"for more than 30 years spent describing, understanding and diagnosing the most common inherited form of stroke, CADASIL"
2020	Sir Adrian Bird	(United Kingdom)	"for their fundamental and pioneering work on Rett syndrome."
2020	Huda Zoghbi	(Lebanon) / (United States)	"for their fundamental and pioneering work on Rett syndrome."
2021	Lars Edvinsson	(Sweden)	"for their groundbreaking work on the causes and treatment of migraine"
2021	Peter Goadsby	(Australia) / (United Kingdom)	"for their groundbreaking work on the causes and treatment of migraine"
2021	Michael A. Moskowitz	(United States)	"for their groundbreaking work on the causes and treatment of migraine"
2021	Jes Olesen	(Denmark)	"for their groundbreaking work on the causes and treatment of migraine"
2022	Silvia Arber	(Switzerland)	"for having revolutionized our understanding of the neuronal cell types and circuits underlying movement."
2022	Ole Kiehn	(Denmark)	"for having revolutionized our understanding of the neuronal cell types and circuits underlying movement."
2022	Martyn Goulding	(New Zealand) / (United States)	"for having revolutionized our understanding of the neuronal cell types and circuits underlying movement."
2023	Michael E. Greenberg	(United States)	"for having revolutionized our understanding of how neurons regulate the thousands of different proteins – the building blocks of life, that are needed to support brain development, plasticity and maintenance."
2023	Christine Holt	(United Kingdom)	"for having revolutionized our understanding of how neurons regulate the thousands of different proteins – the building blocks of life, that are needed to support brain development, plasticity and maintenance."
2023	Erin Schuman	(United States)	"for having revolutionized our understanding of how neurons regulate the thousands of different proteins – the building blocks of life, that are needed to support brain development, plasticity and maintenance."
2024	Larry Abbott	(United States)	"to have made pioneering contributions to the field of computational and theoretical neuroscience and have made seminal contributions to our understanding of the principles that govern the brain’s structure, dynamics and the emergence of cognition and behaviour."
2024	Terrence Sejnowski	(United States)	"to have made pioneering contributions to the field of computational and theoretical neuroscience and have made seminal contributions to our understanding of the principles that govern the brain’s structure, dynamics and the emergence of cognition and behaviour."
2024	Haim Sompolinsky	(Israel)	"to have made pioneering contributions to the field of computational and theoretical neuroscience and have made seminal contributions to our understanding of the principles that govern the brain’s structure, dynamics and the emergence of cognition and behaviour."
2025	Michelle Monje	(United States)	"for pioneering the field of Cancer Neuroscience."
2025	Frank Winkler	(Germany)	"for pioneering the field of Cancer Neuroscience."
2026	Patrik Ernfors	(Sweden)	"for pioneering work on the cellular architecture of somatosensation, revealing how the nervous system detects and processes stimuli such as touch and pain."
2026	David Ginty	(United States)	"for pioneering work on the cellular architecture of somatosensation, revealing how the nervous system detects and processes stimuli such as touch and pain."

== See also ==
- The Kavli Prize
- Golden Brain Award
- Gruber Prize in Neuroscience
- W. Alden Spencer Award
- Karl Spencer Lashley Award
- The Mind & Brain Prize
- Ralph W. Gerard Prize in Neuroscience
- List of neuroscience awards
- List of psychology awards
