= Corporate anniversary =

Celebration of a firm's age

In marketing, a corporate anniversary is a celebration of a firm's continued existence after a particular number of years. The celebration is a media event which can help a firm achieve diverse marketing goals, such as promoting its corporate identity, boosting employee morale, building greater investor confidence, and encouraging sales. As a public relations opportunity, it is a way for a firm to tout past accomplishments while strengthening relationships with employees and customers and investors. The duration of the celebration itself can vary considerably, from an hour or day to activities happening throughout the year. Many businesses use an anniversary to express gratitude for past success. Generally, larger corporations have the means to stage more elaborate celebrations.

== Characteristics ==
An anniversary can advertise a firm's staying power and longevity. A report in The New York Times explained the marketing logic:

Anniversary campaigns are part of a trend inspired by the economy that could be called comfort marketing, as advertisers invoke misty, water-colored memories of the past to woo consumers into buying products in the present. A major aspect of comfort marketing is what brand managers call authenticity: reminding shoppers who seek value in the provenance of merchandise to suggest a product is worth buying because its quality has been tested for decades.

— Stuart Elliott, 2012

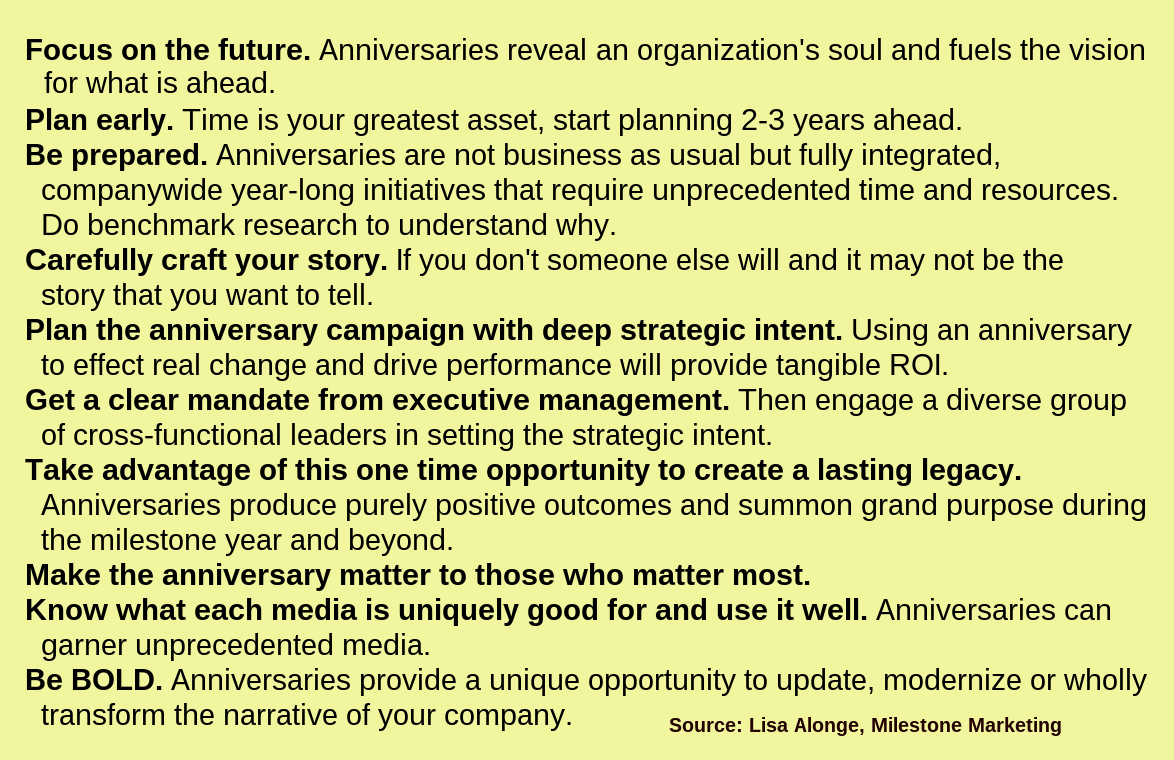

Marketers choose variables relating to anniversaries to meet specific promotional objectives. While the length of time celebrated by an anniversary is often divisible by five, such as the 10th, 15th, 25th, 50th, or 80th anniversary, there are no hard and fast rules. For example, Google celebrated its 13th anniversary with a special "doodle" for its main search page which showed a colorful image of "cake, presents and balloons." Generally, anniversaries are chosen to coincide with marketing initiatives, such that "any coming of age will do," according to one view. An anniversary can commemorate not only a firm's founding year but the introduction of a successful company brand, a merger, a patent, or some other milestone. There are a wide variety of marketing gimmicks and appeals which can accompany an anniversary celebration: sweepstakes, contests, thank you letters, special product editions, parties, guest speakers, birthday displays on websites, giveaways, new product introductions, publicity stunts, sponsorships, fireworks, live musical performances, commemorative packaging, anniversary rings, promotions, signs in retail stores, donations, scholarships, temporary price reductions or discounts, reflections on past accomplishments, special ad campaigns, new logos, and so on.

== Planning ==
Planning an anniversary can take years. In some cases, special marketing consultants and event planners have been hired to coordinate the effort. Large corporations typically work closely with their corporate advertising agency as well as their marketing and sales departments to plan sometimes elaborate campaigns, often with a special theme to mark the occasion. For example, Starbucks marked their 40th anniversary with a redesigned logo and media campaign. Guinness Brewery celebrated its 250th anniversary with a global advertising effort. In 1972, Time magazine celebrated its 50th anniversary with events throughout the year:

So we are 50 years old, and we intend to celebrate. We are planning a series of events for the months ahead—some small and rather personal and sentimental—others on a bigger scale. In all, we hope to reach a lot of people to whom we owe thanks: not only our working colleagues within the company but also the legions of readers and believers who through the years have helped us grow.

— Hedley Donovan, Andrew Heiskell for Time magazine, 1972

There is flexibility in terms of choosing which dates to use when determining an anniversary. The start date is often the month or year when a firm was founded, but this can vary considerably, and exceptions are the rule; for example, Lego toys celebrated its 50th anniversary in 2008 –– exactly 50 years after the time when the founder's son, Godtfred Kirk Christiansen, filed a patent for the iconic plastic bricks in 1958.

== Difficulty in measuring success ==
Measuring the success of any advertising effort, including an anniversary celebration, can be difficult. Sometimes an anniversary generates negative publicity, such as the tenth anniversary of the merger between AOL and Time Warner, which was largely seen as a colossal business blunder. A report in The Guardian suggested that corporate anniversaries do not always lead to "happy returns":

Sometimes, when a brand pins all its advertising and marketing on an anniversary, it can give the impression that it doesn't have anything robust to say about its business; that the only way it is different from its competitors is that it has been going longer. ... The problem is, apart from the odd column inch in the press giving the company free PR, it is not immediately obvious what is gained through anniversary celebrations. Telling your customers you are of a certain age creates nostalgia and makes people think about your brand; on the other hand they would probably prefer you to spend money giving them a discount.

— Lucy Barrett, 2009

== See also ==
- Advertising – Form of communication for marketing
- Corporate identity – Overall image of a corporation, firm or business
- Event management – Purposeful and systematic planning of public events
- Event planning – Purposeful and systematic planning of public events
- Marketing strategy – Organizational efforts to increase sales
- Media event – Event created for publicity
- Public relations – Management of public communication of organizations
