= Michael A. Moskowitz =

American neuroscientist (born 1942)

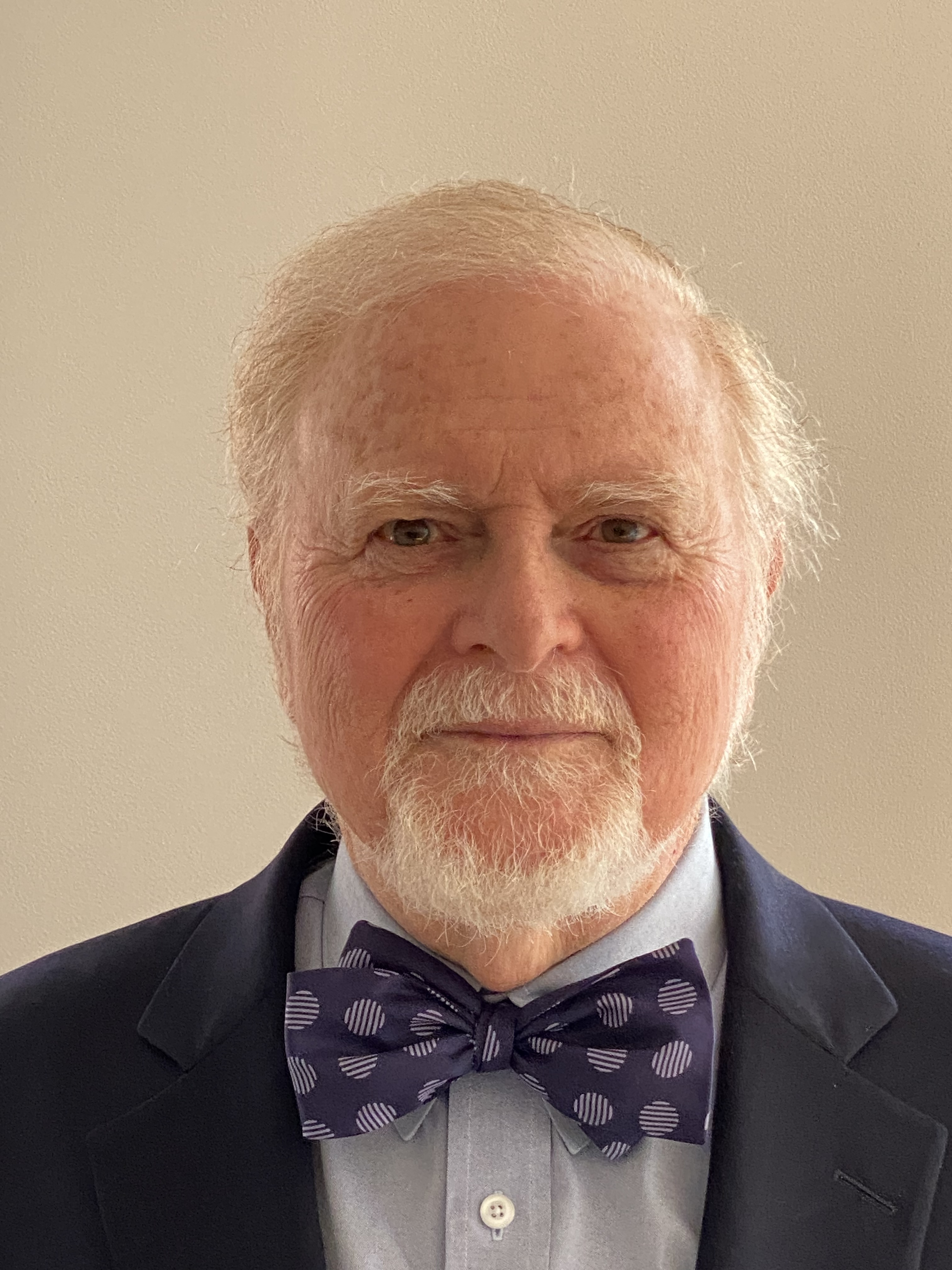
- Born: May 26, 1942; Brooklyn, New York
- Education: Johns Hopkins University, Tufts University School of Medicine
- Awards: Brain Prize (2021)
- Scientific career
- Fields: Neuroscience
- Workplaces: Harvard Medical School, Massachusetts General Hospital

Michael Arthur Moskowitz (born May 26, 1942) is an American neuroscientist who serves as Professor of Neurology at Harvard Medical School. He was also a faculty member and affiliate faculty at the Harvard-MIT Division of Health Sciences & Technology for 25 years. He is known for his research in migraine pathophysiology and neurovascular mechanisms of stroke. Moskowitz was a co-recipient of the Brain Prize in 2021 for his contributions to migraine research. He has received multiple awards and honors and holds patents related to his scientific discoveries.

== Early life and education ==
Moskowitz was born in Brooklyn, New York, and raised in Rockaway Beach. His interest in medicine and neurology was influenced by early life experiences, including accompanying his father, a general practitioner, on house calls. At the age of 14, he worked a summer job at the Jewish Sanatorium for Chronic Diseases, where he observed patients with severe neurological conditions, sparking his curiosity about the human nervous system.

He earned his undergraduate degree from Johns Hopkins University in 1964, followed by a medical degree from Tufts University School of Medicine in 1968. Moskowitz completed an internship and residency at Yale New Haven Hospital between 1968 and 1971, residency in the Longwood Neurology Program in 1971–1973, and pursued a postdoctoral fellowship in neuroscience at the Massachusetts Institute of Technology in 1973–75. He is board certified in Internal Medicine and Neurology.

Moskowitz has been working at the Massachusetts General Hospital since 1981 where he led numerous programs on the biological underpinnings of migraine and stroke.

In 1988–2008, he served as the Principal Investigator of the National Institute of Health's Stroke Program Projects, and in 1995–2010 as the director of the Migraine Program Project at the Massachusetts General Hospital. Moskowitz's work has advanced the development of new therapeutic approaches targeting the molecular pathways involved in these neurological disorders, including the isoforms of nitric oxide synthases, and in program cell death, caspases and kinases.

The laboratory led by Moskowitz has been researching the mechanisms regulating cerebral blood vessel function with a particular focus on interactions between meningeal tissues and inflammatory and vascular cells. Continuing his interest in meningeal mechanisms, he and his MGH colleagues recently discovered bony channels that support bidirectional communication between the skull bone marrow and the brain serving as immune gateways to the brain. These studies are helping to advance investigation into the pathophysiology of stroke, migraine, multiple sclerosis, Alzheimer's disease and traumatic brain injury.

== Research contributions ==
Moskowitz has made significant contributions to understanding the trigeminovascular system's involvement in migraine pathophysiology and the mechanisms by which neurogenic inflammation influences cerebrovascular disorders.

He began researching migraine in 1972 when he was training in internal medicine at Yale School of Medicine, and continued with laboratory research at M.I.T. after pursuing neurological training at the Harvard Longwood Program. After years of studying the literature and neuroanatomy, Moskowitz proposed a new theory that migraine headaches were caused by tiny neuropeptides released by the nerve fibers into the meninges, causing neurogenic inflammation. He proposed neuropeptides as potential therapeutic targets. Following this hypothesis, he discovered the sensory innervation to the circle of Willis, the major network of blood vessels supplying the brain, showed they contained neuropeptides and later, that they were releasable as a consequence of intense neuronal and glial activity, as well as caused neurogenic inflammation in the meninges.

Moskowitz is also credited with elucidating the therapeutic actions of ergot alkaloids, vasoconstricting drugs used for more than hundred years to abort migraine headaches. His lab provided evidence that ergots and more recently discovered antimigraine drug, sumatriptan, inhibited calcitonin gene-related peptide (CGRP) release from trigeminovascular afferents via prejunctional receptor mechanisms, identifying the trigeminal nerve fiber as the target for the therapeutic actions of ergot alkaloids and sumatriptan and CGRP as a key player in migraine pathophysiology. Studying the link between cerebral arteries and the trigeminal nerve's ophthalmic division, he and other researchers discovered 5HT receptors expressed by nerve fibers that reduce inflammation and pain. These discoveries led to the development of CGRP-targeting therapies and a non-constricting drug for acute migraine treatment. His work has also contributed to understanding the neurovascular unit in stroke and its response to ischemic injury.

== Awards and honors ==
Moskowitz has received several awards and honors in recognition of his contributions to neuroscience, including:

- International Prize for Translational Neuroscience of the Gertrud Reemtsma Foundation, 1997
- Harvard Medical School William Silen Lifetime Achievement in Mentoring Award, 2006
- Honorary Life Membership by the International Headache Society for influential work in headache research, 2011
- Honorary Doctorate by the National and Kapodistrian University of Athens, Greece, 2019
- The Brain Prize, awarded for groundbreaking research in migraine pathophysiology, 2021
- Honorary Doctorate by Clermont Auvergne University, France, 2022
- The Javits Neuroscience Investigator Award from the National Institute of Neurological Disorders and Stroke for distinguished scientific achievements, 2024

== Selected publications ==
Moskowitz has authored and co-authored numerous scientific papers in leading journals, focusing on neurovascular mechanisms, migraine, and stroke. His publications have significantly influenced the field of neurology, particularly in the understanding and treatment of migraine, including:

- Mayberg, Marc; Langer, Robert S.; Zervas, Nicholas T.; Moskowitz, Michael A. (10 July 1981). "Perivascular Meningeal Projections from Cat Trigeminal Ganglia: Possible Pathway for Vascular Headaches in Man". Science. 213 (4504): 228–230. doi:10.1126/science.6166046.
- Moskowitz, Michael A. (1984). "The neurobiology of vascular head pain". Annals of Neurology. 16 (2): 157–168. doi:10.1002/ana.410160202.
- Liu-Chen, Lee-Yuan; Gillespie, Steven A.; Norregaard, Thorkild V.; Moskowitz, Michael A. (1984). "Co-localization of retrogradely transported wheat germ agglutinin and the putative neurotransmitter substance P within trigeminal ganglion cells projecting to cat middle cerebral artery". Journal of Comparative Neurology. 225 (2): 187–192. doi:10.1002/cne.902250204.
- Buzzi, M. Gabriella; Moskowitz, Michael A. (1990). "The antimigraine drug, sumatriptan (GR43175), selectively blocks neurogenic plasma extravasation from blood vessels in dura mater". British Journal of Pharmacology. 99 (1): 202–206. doi:10.1111/j.1476-5381.1990.tb14679.x. PMC 1917483.
- Buzzi, M. Gabriella; Carter, W. B.; Shimizu, T.; Heath, H.; Moskowitz, M. A. (1 November 1991). "Dihydroergotamine and sumatriptan attenuate levels of CGRP in plasma in rat superior sagittal sinus during electrical stimulation of the trigeminal ganglion". Neuropharmacology. 30 (11): 1193–1200. doi:10.1016/0028-3908(91)90165-8.
- Moskowitz, Michael A (1 June 1992). "Trigeminovascular System". Cephalalgia. 12 (3): 127–127. doi:10.1046/j.1468-2982.1992.1203127.x.
- Hadjikhani, Nouchine; Sanchez del Rio, Margarita; Wu, Ona; Schwartz, Denis; Bakker, Dick; Fischl, Bruce; Kwong, Kenneth K.; Cutrer, F. Michael; Rosen, Bruce R.; Tootell, Roger B. H.; Sorensen, A. Gregory; Moskowitz, Michael A. (10 April 2001). "Mechanisms of migraine aura revealed by functional MRI in human visual cortex". Proceedings of the National Academy of Sciences. 98 (8): 4687–4692. doi:10.1073/pnas.071582498. PMC 31895.
- Bolay, Hayrunnisa; Reuter, Uwe; Dunn, Andrew K.; Huang, Zhihong; Boas, David A.; Moskowitz, Michael A. (February 2002). "Intrinsic brain activity triggers trigeminal meningeal afferents in a migraine model". Nature Medicine. 8 (2): 136–142. doi:10.1038/nm0202-136.
- Pietrobon, Daniela; Moskowitz, Michael A. (10 February 2013). "Pathophysiology of Migraine". Annual Review of Physiology. 75: 365–391. doi:10.1146/annurev-physiol-030212-183717. hdl:11577/2598848.
- Ashina, Messoud; Hansen, Jakob Møller; Do, Thien Phu; Melo-Carrillo, Agustin; Burstein, Rami; Moskowitz, Michael A. (1 August 2019). "Migraine and the trigeminovascular system—40 years and counting". The Lancet Neurology. 18 (8): 795–804. doi:10.1016/S1474-4422(19)30185-1. PMC 7164539.
- Levy, Dan; Moskowitz, Michael A. (10 July 2023). "Meningeal Mechanisms and the Migraine Connection". Annual Review of Neuroscience. 46: 39–58. doi:10.1146/annurev-neuro-080422-105509. PMC 11412714.

== Professional affiliations ==
Moskowitz is affiliated with several professional organizations, including the International Headache Society and International Society for the Study of Cerebral Blood Flow and Metabolism, and has served on advisory boards and committees related to neurological research.
