= Terje Lømo =

Norwegian physiologist (born 1935)

- Born: 3 January 1935 (age 91); Ålesund, Norway
- Occupation: Physiologist
- Awards: Order of St. Olav

Terje Lømo (born 3 January 1935) is a Norwegian physiologist who specialized in neuroscience. He was born in Ålesund to dentist Leif Lømo and Ingeborg Rebekka Helseth.

Lømo in 1966, while beginning his PhD, worked in Per Oskar Andersen's lab in the Department of Physiology in Oslo. This was part of an apprenticeship dealing with hippocampal studies. By 1968, Timothy Bliss had joined Lømo in Andersen's laboratory for studies in memory mechanisms within the hippocampus. Lømo is known for his studies on synapses, in particular the synaptic plasticity. His discovery of the long-term potentiation, along with fellow researcher Tim Bliss, is regarded as a fundamental work in neurophysiology. He was awarded the Medical prize of Anders Jahre in 2003, and was decorated Commander of the Order of St. Olav in 2009. He is a fellow of the Norwegian Academy of Science and Letters.
