= David Ginty =

American neuroscientist & developmental biologist (born 1962)

David D. Ginty
- Born: 1962 (age 63–64); Connecticut, U.S.
- Scientific career
- Fields: Neuroscience
- Doctoral advisor: Edward Seidel
- Other academic advisors: Michael Greenberg

Dr. David D. Ginty (born 1962) is an American neuroscientist and developmental biologist.

David graduated from Mount Saint Mary's College and received his Ph.D. degree in physiology from East Carolina University for graduate work with Edward Seidel, on the regulation of polyamine compounds and their metabolism during cell growth and proliferation. Moving to Boston, David completed his postdoctoral research, first, with John Wagner at the Dana–Farber Cancer Institute at Harvard Medical School, and then with Michael Greenberg at Harvard Medical School, where he made several seminal contributions to signal transduction and growth factor signaling in neurons.

In 1995, David was invited by Solomon Snyder to move to Baltimore, Maryland, to become a new faculty member of the Department of Neuroscience at the Johns Hopkins University School of Medicine. In 2000, he became an investigator of the Howard Hughes Medical Institute. David remained a faculty member at Johns Hopkins for 18 years. In the fall of 2013, David and his laboratory moved from Maryland to Boston, MA, where he became the Edward R. and Anne G. Lefler Professor of Neurobiology in the Department of Neurobiology at Harvard Medical School, while maintaining his status of an HHMI investigator.

In the 1990s, David received several young investigator awards including a Klingenstein Award, a Pew Biomedical Scholar Award, and the Basil O'Connor Starter Scholar Award from the March of Dimes. After becoming established, he received a Jacob Javitz Neuroscience Investigator's Award from the National Institutes of Health. In 2015, David was elected into the American Academy of Arts and Sciences. In 2017, David was elected to the National Academy of Sciences. In 2026 he was awarded The Brain Prize.

His lab at Johns Hopkins discovered functions and mechanisms of action of neuronal growth factors and axon guidance cues, and mechanisms of assembly and functional organization of the neural circuits that underlie autonomic functions and the sense of touch. His lab at Harvard uses a variety of techniques including genetics, circuit mapping, and electrophysiological analyses to gain understanding of the development, organization, and function of neural circuits that underlie the sense of touch. He uses mouse molecular genetic approaches to identify, visualize, and functionally manipulate physiologically defined classes of low-threshold mechanosensory neurons (LTMRs), the primary cutaneous sensory neurons that mediate the sense of touch, as well as spinal cord neurons that process LTMR information and convey it to the brain.
