= Timothy Bliss =

British neuroscientist

Tim Bliss
- Born: Timothy Vivian Pelham Bliss; 27 July 1940 (age 85)
- Education: Dean Close School
- Alma mater: McGill University
- Awards: FRS (1994); Croonian Lecture (2012)
- Scientific career
- Institutions: National Institute for Medical Research; University College London

Timothy Vivian Pelham Bliss FRS (born 27 July 1940) is a British neuroscientist. He is an adjunct professor at the University of Toronto, and a group leader emeritus at the Francis Crick Institute, London.

In 2016 Professor Tim Bliss shared with Professors Graham Collingridge and Richard Morris the 2016 Brain Prize, one of the world's most coveted science prizes.

== Life ==
Born in England he was educated at Dean Close School and McGill University (BSc, 1963; PhD, 1967). In 1967, he joined the MRC National Institute for Medical Research in Mill Hill, London, where he was Head of the Division of Neurophysiology from 1988 till 2006. His work with Terje Lømo in Per Andersen's laboratory at the University of Oslo in the late 1960s established the phenomenon of long-term potentiation (LTP) as the dominant synaptic model of how the mammalian brain stores memories.

== Career and research ==
In 1973, he and Terje Lømo published the first evidence of a Hebb-like synaptic plasticity event induced by brief tetanic stimulation, known as long-term potentiation (LTP). His work has done much to provide a neural explanation for learning and memory. Studying the hippocampus – the memory centre of the brain – Tim showed that the strength of signals between neurons in the brain exhibits a long-term increase following brief but intense activation, a phenomenon known as long-term potentiation (LTP).

Whilst LTP was discovered in Oslo in the lab of Per Andersen, Tim's subsequent research into the cellular properties of LTP and its relation to memory was conducted at London's National Institute for Medical Research where he worked from 1968 to 2006, becoming head of Neurosciences. He is visiting professor at University College London.

Bliss is on the board of the Feldberg Foundation and was trustee of Sir John Soane's Museum from 2004 to 2009. From the years 2009 until 2013, Bliss worked as an adjunct professor in the South Korean university, Seoul National University.

== Awards and Honours ==
- 1991 Bristol-Myers Squibb Award for Neuroscience (with E. Kandel)
- 1994 Feldberg Prize
- 1994 Fellow of the Royal Society
- 1998 Founding Fellow of the Academy of Medical Sciences
- 2003 Annual Award for Contributions to British Neuroscience, British Neuroscience Society
- 2012 Croonian Prize Lecture, Royal Society (this is the Society's principal lecture in the biological sciences, given annually since 1738)
- 2013 Ipsen Prize for Neuronal Plasticity; Hon LlD Dalhousie University (with R. Morris and Y. Dudai)
- 2014 Hon DSc University of Hertfordshire
- 2016 The Brain Prize, Lundbeck Foundation

== Notable Contributions ==
Publications and Credits
Year	Title	Journal
1969	Lamellar Organization of Hippocampal Excitatory Pathways	Acta Physiologica Scandinavica
1970	Plasticity in a Monosynaptic Cortical Pathway	The Journal of Physiology
1971	Unit Analysis of Hippocampal Population Spikes	Experimental Brain Research
1971	Long-Lasting Increases of Synaptic Influence in the Unanesthetized Hippocampus	The Journal of Physiology
1971	Lamellar Organization of Hippocampal Pathways	Experimental Brain Research
1973	Long-Lasting Potentiation of Synaptic Transmission in the Dentate Area of the Anaesthetized Rabbit Following Stimulation of the Perforant Path	The Journal of Physiology
1979	Synaptic Plasticity in the Hippocampus	Trends in Neurosciences
