= Frank Winkler (physician) =

German surgeon

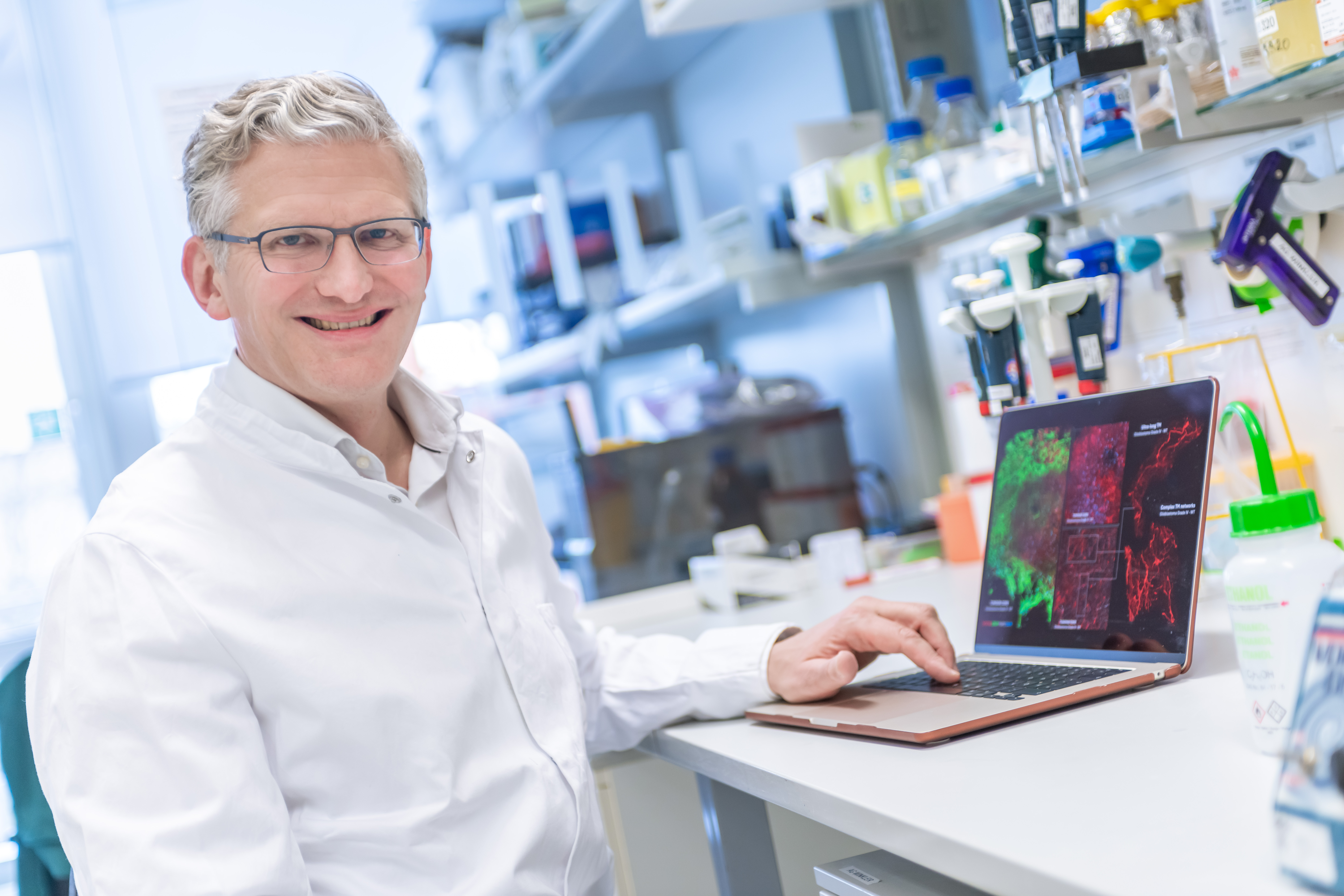
- Frank Winkler
- Born: 1971 (age 54–55); Hamburg, Germany
- Occupations: Physician, professor
- Spouse: Eva Winkler

Frank Winkler (born 1971) is a German neurologist and neuroscientist. He has been a professor at the Heidelberg University since 2012 and Managing Senior Physician at the Department of Neurology at Heidelberg University Hospital since 2016.

== Life and academic career ==
Frank Winkler grew up in Hamburg, where he attended the Wilhelm-Gymnasium. After graduating from high school, he studied human medicine at the University of Hamburg with stays in Freiburg, Cape Town and London at the National Hospital for Neurology and Neurosurgery.

In 1999, he began his training at the Neurological Clinic, Großhadern Hospital of LMU Munich. From 2002 to 2004, he completed a post-doctoral programme at Harvard University. During this time, he conducted research on the influence of the vascular system on brain tumours.

In 2012, he was appointed professor of Experimental Neuro-Oncology at the Department of Neurology in Heidelberg, where he has been senior physician since 2014. His Experimental Neuro-Oncology research group is based at the German Cancer Research Centre (DKFZ) in Heidelberg. His wife Eva Winkler is a specialist in haematology/oncology at Heidelberg University Hospital and a member of the German Ethics Council.

== Research ==
The laboratory led by Frank Winkler has used neuroscience methods to develop a new understanding of malignant adult brain tumours, glioblastomas and brain metastases. Key discoveries from this work have helped to establish the new field of cancer neuroscience research. These include malignant multicellular tumour networks that are highly functional and resilient and driven by developmental neurobiological factors, including pacemaker-like tumour cells in network nodes and excitatory synapses between brain neurons and various incurable brain tumour entities that drive brain tumour growth, invasion, and metastasis.

Frank Winkler has initiated clinical trials investigating how brain tumours in humans can be better controlled by disrupting neuro-cancer networks.

== Awards (selection) ==
- 2025 - The Brain Prize
- 2023/2024 - BIAL Award in Biomedicine
- 2022 - German Cancer Award by the German Cancer Society (Translational Research.
- 2010 - Sibylle Assmus Award for Neurooncology
- 2003/2004 - Emmy Noether Fellow
- 2002 - Scientific Award of the Paul-Ehrlich Society

== Publications (selection) ==
- Hausmann D, Hoffmann DC, Venkataramani V, Jung E, Horschitz S, Tetzlaff SK, Jabali A, Hai L, Kessler T, Azoŕin DD, Weil S, Kourtesakis A, Sievers P, Habel A, Breckwoldt MO, Karreman MA, Ratliff M, Messmer JM, Yang Y, Reyhan E, Wendler S, Löb C, Mayer C, Figarella K, Osswald M, Solecki G, Sahm F, Garaschuk O, Kuner T, Koch P, Schlesner M, Wick W & F. Winkler. Autonomous rhythmic activity in glioma networks drives brain tumour growth. Nature 2023; 613:179-186. DOI:10.1038/s41586-022-05520-4. Rare pacemaker-like tumor cells generate rhythmic Ca2+ activity in structurally resilient brain tumor networks, recapitulating a neurodevelopmental mechanism to drive tumor progression.
- Venkataramani V*, Yang Y, Schubert MC, Reyhan E, Tetzlaff SK, Wissmann N, Botz M, Soyka SJ, Beretta CA, Pramatarov RL, Fankhauser L, Garofano L, Freudenberg A, Wagner J, Tanev DI, Ratliff M, Xie R, Kessler T, Hoffmann DC, Hai L, Dorflinger Y, Hoppe S, Yabo YA, Golebiewska A, Niclou SP, Sahm F, Lasorella A, Slowik M, Doring L, Iavarone A, Wick W, Kuner T* & F. Winkler*. Glioblastoma hijacks neuronal mechanisms for brain invasion. Cell 2022; 185:2899-2917. DOI:10.1016/j.cell.2022.06.054. A specific subpopulation of brain tumor cells with molecular and cellular neuronal features is responsible for effective brain colonization, and receives direct synaptic input from neurons.
- Jung E, Osswald M, Ratliff M, Dogan H, Xie R, Weil S, Hoffmann DC, Kurz FT, Kessler T, Heiland S, von Deimling A, Sahm F, Wick W & F. Winkler. Tumor cell plasticity, heterogeneity, and resistance in crucial microenvironmental niches in glioma. Nat Commun 2021; 12:1014. DOI:10.1038/s41467-021-21117-3. Neural-like brain tumor networks and also the perivascular niche are prime anatomical niches of resistance in the brain, with NOTCH1 as the main switch that determins niche position.
- Feinauer MJ, Schneider SW, Berghoff AS, Robador JR, Tehranian C, Karreman MA, Venkataramani V, Solecki G, Grosch JK, Gunkel K, Kovalchuk B, Mayer FT, Fischer M, Breckwoldt MO, Brune M, Schwab Y, Wick W, Bauer AT & F. Winkler. Local blood coagulation drives cancer cell arrest and brain metastasis in a mouse model. Blood 2021; 137:1219-1232. DOI:10.1182/blood.2020005710. Application of the method developed in Ref. 9 to identify blood clot formation as an early important event of brain metastasis formation that is a plausible preventive drug target.
- Venkataramani V*, Tanev DI, [+24 authors], Wick W, F. Winkler* & T. Kuner*. Glutamatergic synaptic input to glioma cells drives brain tumour progression. Nature 2019; 573: 532-538. DOI:10.1038/s41586-019-1564-x. Neurons form excitatory, glutamatergic bona-fide synapses with postsynaptic glioma cells that activate the brain tumor cells, and can be inhibited by the AMPA receptor inhibitor perampanel.
- Weil S, Osswald M, Solecki G, Grosch J, Jung E, Lemke D, Ratliff M, Hänggi D, Wick W, F. Winkler. Tumor microtubes convey resistance to surgical lesions and chemotherapy in gliomas. Neuro Oncol 2017; 19:1316-1326. DOI:10.1093/neuonc/nox070. Brain tumor cell networks are able to self-repair surgical lesions, and also resist chemotherapy.
- Jung E, Osswald M, Blaes J, Wiestler B, Sahm F, [+13 authors], Platten M, von Deimling A, Wick W, F. Winkler. Tweety-Homolog 1 Drives Brain Colonization of Gliomas. J Neurosci 2017; 37:6837-6850. DOI:10.1523/JNEUROSCI.3532-16.2017. Neurite-like brain tumor cell extensions depend on the neurodevelopmental factor Ttyh1.
- Osswald M, Jung E, Sahm F, Solecki G, Venkataramani V, [+29 authors], Platten M, Huber PE, Kuner T, von Deimling A, Wick W, F. Winkler. Brain tumour cells interconnect to a functional and resistant network. Nature 2015; 528:93-8. DOI:10.1038/nature16071. Discovery and characterization of neuronal-like cell extensions of brain tumor cells that are relevant for key pathological hallmarks, and interconnect to a communicating network.
- Kienast Y, von Baumgarten L, Fuhrmann M, Klinkert W, Goldbrunner R, Herms J, F. Winkler. Real-time imaging reveals the single steps of brain metastasis formation. Nat Med 2010; 16: 116-122. DOI:10.1038/nm.2072. Establishment of an in vivo two-photon methodology that allows to study interactions of individual tumor cells with the brain for many months, used here to unravel key steps of brain metastasis.
- Winkler F*, Venkatesh HS, Amit M, Batchelor T, Demir IE, Deneen B, Gutmann DH, Hervey-Jumper S, Kuner T, Mabbott D, Platten M, Rolls A, Sloan EK, Wang TC, Wick W, Venkataramani V*, Monje M* (2023). Cancer neuroscience: State of the field, emerging directions. Cell 186: 1689-1707. The current white paper of the field of Cancer Neuroscience.
