= Jens Lothe =

Norwegian physicist (1931–2016)

Jens Lothe (25 November 1931 – 26 September 2016) was a Norwegian physicist.

He was born in Oslo as a son of principal Jakob Lothe and Borghild Holtung. In 1960 he married Solveig Elisabeth Seeberg. They have resided in Blommenholm and Vøyenenga.

He finished his secondary education in 1950 and graduated from the University of Oslo with the cand.real. degree in 1955. With a scholarship from NTNF he studied at the University of Bristol from 1957 to 1958, before being appointed as an associate professor at the University of Oslo in 1959. He was an associate professor at the Carnegie Institute of Technology from 1960 to 1962, docent at the University of Oslo from 1963 and visiting professor at Ohio State University from 1965 to 1966.

He took the dr.philos. degree in 1968, and in 1972 he finally became a professor of solid-state physics at the University of Oslo. He retired in 2002.

In 1973 he became a fellow of the Norwegian Academy of Science and Letters, and in the same year he was given the Fridtjof Nansen Excellent Research Award. He was issued a Festschrift for his 60th birthday, in the shape of a special issue of the journal Physica Scripta. He died on 26 September 2016.

Awards
Preceded by Per Andersen	Recipient of the Fridtjof Nansen Excellent Research Award in Science; 1973	Succeeded by Fredrik Kiil
