= Endre Grastyán =

Hungarian physician (1924–1988)

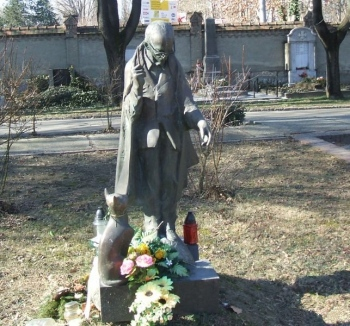

Endre Grastyán (February 25, 1924 in Oriszentpeter – June 17, 1988 in Pécs) was a Hungarian medical doctor, physiologist, professor.

Grastyán graduated from the University of Pécs and later became the head of the Medical School's Institute of Physiology until his death. He was a member of the Hungarian Academy of Sciences, leading the Nerve Physiology Research Group.

He was a groundbreaking researcher in physiology, studying under Kalman Lissak. His students include György Buzsáki.

In September 2024 a sculpture in Grastyán's memory was unveiled at the University of Pécs Medical School, in the community park.
