= David W. Tank =

American molecular biologist and neuroscientist

- Education: Case Western Reserve University (B.S.), Cornell University (Ph.D.)
- Awards: W. Alden Spencer Award (2006); Rosenstiel Award (2013); Karl Spencer Lashley Award (2015)
- Scientific career
- Fields: Neuroscience
- Workplaces: Bell Laboratories, Princeton University
- Doctoral advisor: Watt W. Webb

David W. Tank is an American physicist and neuroscientist who is the Henry L. Hillman Professor in Molecular Biology at Princeton University.

== Education and academic career ==
Tank received his bachelor's degree from Case Western Reserve University in 1976 and his Ph.D. from Cornell University in 1983, both in physics. After finishing his Ph.D., Tank became a researcher at Bell Laboratories; from 1991 to his departure in 2001, he served as the director of the Biological Computing Research Department. Tank joined the faculty at Princeton in 2001. He and Jonathan Cohen became the founding co-directors of the Princeton Neuroscience Institute when it opened in 2006.

Tank was elected a fellow of the American Physical Society in 1990, a fellow of the American Academy of Arts and Sciences in 2000, and a member of the National Academy of Sciences in 2001. He received the Grete Lundbeck European Brain Research Prize - often known as the Brain Prize - in 2015, along with Winfried Denk, Arthur Konnerth, and Karel Svoboda. Also in 2015, Tank was awarded the University of North Carolina's Perl-UNC Neuroscience Prize.

== Research ==
While at Bell Labs, Tank was involved in the development of functional MRI imaging technology; with Seiji Ogawa and others, the team published a series of papers first establishing the BOLD signal method of measuring brain activity. Tank's research interests at Princeton have recently focused on the physical mechanisms of neural circuit dynamics, particularly those that underlie short-term memory of motor activity in animal models. The group also develops laboratory methods and technologies in microscopy.
