= Corporate identity =

Overall image of a corporation, firm or business

A corporate identity or corporate image is the manner in which a corporation, firm or business enterprise presents itself to the public. The corporate identity is typically visualized by branding and with the use of trademarks, but it can also include things like product design, advertising, public relations etc. Corporate identity is a primary goal of corporate communication, aiming to build and maintain company identity.

In general, this amounts to a corporate title, logo (logotype and/or logogram) and supporting devices commonly assembled within a set of corporate guidelines. These guidelines govern how the identity is applied and usually include approved color palettes, typefaces, page layouts, fonts, and others.

== Integrated marketing communications (IMC) ==
Corporate identity is the set of multi-sensory elements that marketers employ to communicate a visual statement about the brand to consumers. These multi-sensory elements include but are not limited to company name, logo, slogan, buildings, décor, uniforms, company colors and in some cases, the physical appearance of customer-facing employees. Corporate Identity is either weak or strong; to understand this concept, it is beneficial to consider exactly what constitutes a strong corporate identity.

Consonance, in the context of marketing, is a unified message offered to consumers from all fronts of the organization (Laurie & Mortimer, 2011). In the context of corporate identity, consonance is the alignment of all touch points. For example, Apple has strong brand consonance because at every point at which the consumer interacts with the brand, a consistent message is conveyed. This is seen in Apple TV advertisements, the Apple Store design, the physical presentation of customer facing Apple employees and the actual products, such as the iPhone, iPad and MacBook laptops. Every Apple touch point is communicating a unified message: From the advertising of the brand to the product packaging, the message sent to consumers is 'we are simple, sophisticated, fun and user friendly'. Brand consonance solidifies corporate identity and encourages brand acceptance, on the grounds that when a consumer is exposed to a consistent message multiple times across the entirety of a brand, the message is easier to trust and the existence of the brand is easier to accept. Strong brand consonance is imperative to achieving strong corporate identity.

Strong consonance, and in turn, strong corporate identity can be achieved through the implementation and integration of integrated marketing communications (IMC). IMC is a collective of concepts and communications processes that seek to establish clarity and consistency in the positioning of a brand in the mind of consumers. As espoused by Holm (cited in Laurie & Mortimer, 2011), at its ultimate stage, IMC is implemented at a corporate level and consolidates all aspects of the organization; this initiates brand consonance which in turn inspires strong corporate identity. To appreciate this idea with heavier mental weight, it is important to regard the different levels of IMC integration.

The communication-based model, advanced by Duncan and Moriarty (as cited in Laurie & Mortimer, 2011) contends that there are three levels of IMC integration; Duncan and Moriarty affirm that the lowest level of IMC integration is level one where IMC decisions are made by marketing communication level message sources. These sources include personal sales, advertising, sales promotion, direct marketing, public relations, packaging and events departments. The stake holders concerned at this stage are consumers, local communities, media and interest groups (Duncan and Moriarty, 1998 as cited in Laurie & Mortimer, 2011). At the second stage of IMC integration, Duncan and Moriarty (as cited in Laurie & Mortimer, 2011) establish that level one integration departments still have decision-making power but are now guided by marketing level message sources. At stage two integration the message sources are those departments in which product mix, price mix, marketing communication and distribution mix are settled; appropriately, stakeholders at this stage of integration are distributors, suppliers and competition (Duncan and Moriarty, 1998 as cited in Laurie & Mortimer, 2011). It is at this stage of integration that consumers interact with the organization (Duncan and Moriarty, 1998 as cited in Laurie & Mortimer, 2011). Moving forward, the last stage of Duncan and Moriarty's Communication Based Model (as cited in Laurie and Mortimer, 2011) is stage three where message sources are at the corporate level of the organization; these message sources include administration, manufacturing operations, marketing, finance, human resources and legal departments. The stakeholders at this level of IMC integration are employees, investors, financial community, government and regulators (Duncan and Moriarty, 1998 as cited in Laurie & Mortimer, 2011). At the final stages of IMC integration, IMC decisions are made not only by corporate level departments but also by departments classified in stages one and two. It is the inclusion of all organizational departments by which a horizontal, non linear method of communication with consumers is achieved. By unifying all fronts of the marketing firm, communications are synchronized to achieve consistency, consonance and ultimately strong corporate identity.

== Organizational point of view ==
In a recent monograph on Chinese corporate identity (Routledge, 2006), Peter Peverelli, proposes a new definition of corporate identity, based on the general organization theory proposed in his earlier work, in particular Peverelli (2000). This definition regards identity as a result of social interaction:

- Corporate identity is the way corporate actors (actors who perceive themselves as acting on behalf of the company) make sense of their company in ongoing social interaction with other actors in a specific context. It includes shared perceptions of reality, ways-to-do-things, etc., and interlocked behavior.
- In this process, corporate actors are of equal importance to those others; corporate identity pertains to the company (the group of corporate actors) as well as to the relevant others;

=== Best practices ===
The following four key brand requirements are critical to a successful corporate identity strategy.

- Differentiation. In today's highly competitive market, brands need to have a clear differentiation or reason for being. What they represent needs to stand apart from others in order to be noticed, make an impression, and to ultimately be preferred.
- Relevance. Brands need to connect to what people care about in the world. To build demand, they need to understand and fulfill the needs and aspirations of their intended audiences.
- Coherence. To assure credibility with their audiences, brands must be coherent in what they say and do. All the messages, all the marketing communication, all the brand experiences, and all of the product delivery need to hang together and add up to something meaningful.
- Esteem. A brand that is differentiated, relevant and coherent is one that is valued by both its internal and external audiences. Esteem is the reputation a brand has earned by executing clearly on both its promised and delivered experience.

== Visual identity ==
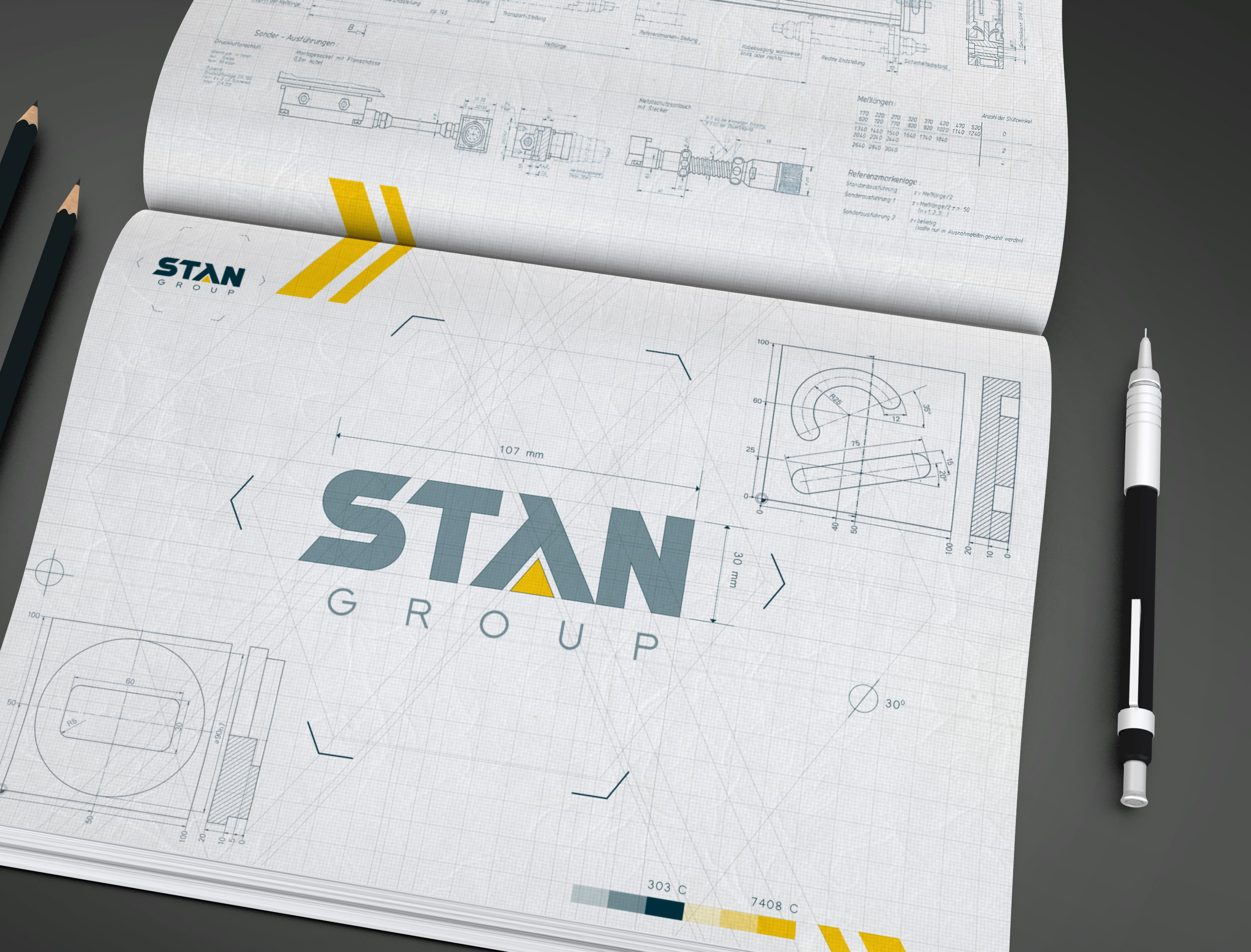
Corporate brand attributes example — brand signature: brand mark (trademark), brand logotype, brandline (or brand slogan) and supergraphics.

Corporate visual identity plays a significant role in the way an organization presents itself to both internal and external stakeholders. In general terms, a corporate visual identity expresses the values and ambitions of an organization, its business, and its characteristics. Four functions of corporate visual identity can be distinguished. Three of these are aimed at external stakeholders.

1. A corporate visual identity provides an organization with visibility and "recognizability". For virtually all profit and non-profit organizations, it is of vital importance that people know that the organization exists and remember its name and core business at the right time.
2. A corporate visual identity symbolizes an organization for external stakeholders, and, hence, contributes to its image and reputation (Schultz, Hatch and Larsen, 2000). Van den Bosch, De Jong and Elving (2005) explored possible relationships between corporate visual identity and reputation, and concluded that corporate visual identity plays a supportive role in corporate reputation.
3. A corporate visual identity expresses the structure of an organization to its external stakeholders, visualizing its coherence as well as the relationships between divisions or units. Olins (1989) is well known for his "corporate identity structure", which consists of three concepts: monolithic brands for companies which have a single brand, identity in which different brands are developed for parts of the organization or for different product lines, and an endorsed identity with different brands which are (visually) connected to each other. Although these concepts introduced by Olins are often presented as the corporate identity structure, they merely provide an indication of the visual presentation of (parts of) the organization. It is therefore better to describe it as a "corporate visual identity structure".
4. An internal function of corporate visual identity relates to employees' identification with the organization as a whole and/or the specific departments they work for (depending on the corporate visual strategy in this respect). Identification appears to be crucial for employees, and corporate visual identity probably plays a symbolic role in creating such identification.

The definition of the corporate visual identity management is:

Corporate visual identity management involves the planned maintenance, assessment and development of a corporate visual identity as well as associated tools and support, anticipating developments both inside and outside the organization, and engaging employees in applying it, with the objective of contributing to employees' identification with and appreciation of the organization as well as recognition and appreciation among external stakeholders.

Special attention is paid to corporate identity during times of organizational change. Once a new corporate identity is implemented, attention to corporate identity-related issues generally tends to decrease. However, corporate identity needs to be managed on a structural basis, internalized by employees, and harmonized with future organizational developments.

Efforts to manage the corporate visual identity will result in more consistency, and the corporate visual identity management mix should include structural, cultural, and strategic aspects. Guidelines, procedures and tools can be summarized as the structural aspects of managing the corporate visual identity.

However, as important as the structural aspects may be, they must be complemented by two other types of aspects. Among the cultural aspects of corporate visual identity management, socialization – i.e., formal and informal learning processes – turned out to influence the consistency of a corporate visual identity. Managers are important as a role models and they can clearly set an example. This implies that they need to be aware of the impact of their behavior, which has an effect on how employees behave. If managers pay attention to the way they convey the identity of their organization, including the use of a corporate visual identity, this will have a positive effect on the attention employees give to the corporate visual identity.

Further, it seems to be important that the organization communicates the strategic aspects of the corporate visual identity. Employees need to have knowledge of the corporate visual identity of their organization – not only the general reasons for using the corporate visual identity, such as its role in enhancing the visibility and "recognizability" of the organization, but also aspects of the story behind the corporate visual identity. The story should explain why the design fits the organization and what the design – in all of its elements – is intended to express.

== Corporate colors ==
Corporate colors (or company colors) are one of the most instantly recognizable elements of a corporate visual identity and promote a strong non-verbal message on the company's behalf. Examples of corporate colors:

- Red for Coca-Cola and SMRT
- Blue for IBM, nicknamed "Big Blue"
- Brown for UPS, "What can Brown do for you"
- Blue for Korean Air
- Purple and Orange for SBS Transit

== Visual identity history ==
Rod of Asclepius

Nearly 7,000 years ago, Transylvanian potters inscribed their personal marks on the earthenware they created. If one potter made better pots than another, naturally, his mark held more value than his competitors'. Religions created some of the most recognized identity marks: the Christian cross, the Judaic Star of David, and the Islamic crescent moon. In addition, Kings and nobles in medieval times had clothing, armor, flags, shields, tableware, entryways, and manuscript bindings that all bore coats of arms and royal seals. The symbols depicted a lord's lineage, aspirations, familial virtues, as well as memoirs to cavalry, infantry, and mercenaries of who they were fighting for on the battlefields.

A trademark became a symbol of individuals' professional qualifications to perform a particular skill by the 15th century. For example, the Rod of Asclepius on a physician's sign signified that the doctor was a well-trained practitioner of the medical arts. Simple graphics such as the caduceus carried so much socio-economic and political weight by the 16th century, that government offices were established throughout Europe to register and protect the growing collection of trademarks used by numerous craft guilds.

The concept of visually trademarking one's business spread widely during the Industrial Revolution. The shift of business in favor of non-agricultural enterprise caused business, and corporate consciousness, to boom. Logo use became a mainstream part of identification, and over time, it held more power than being a simple identifier. Some logos held more value than others, and served more as assets than symbols.

Logos are now the visual identifiers of corporations. They became components of corporate identities by communicating brands and unifying messages. Logos commonly function as a solution to the challenge of distinguishing one brand from another. The evolution of symbols went from a way for a king to seal a letter, to how businesses establish their credibility and sell everything from financial services to hamburgers. Therefore, although the specific terms "corporate image" and "[brand identity]" didn't enter business or design vocabulary until the 1940s, within twenty years they became key elements to business success.

== Media and corporate identity ==
As technology and mass media have continued to develop at exponential rates, the role of the media in business increases as well. The media has a large effect on the formation of corporate identity by reinforcing a company's image and reputation. Global television networks and the rise of business news have caused the public representation of organizations to critically influence the construction and deconstruction of certain organizational identities more than ever before.

Many companies pro-actively choose to create media attention and use it as a tool for identity construction and strengthening, and also to reinvent their images under the pressure of new technology. The media also has the power to produce and diffuse meanings a corporation holds, therefore giving stakeholders a negotiation of the organizational identity.

== See also ==
- Brand equity – Marketing term
- Brand management – Process in brand marketing
- Corporate anniversary
- Corporate propaganda – Claims made by corporations for the purpose of manipulating market opinion
- Federal Identity Program – Program of the Government of Canada
- Graphic charter – Project document
- Marketing – Study and process of exploring, creating, and delivering value to customers
- Product management – Organizational role in companies
- Product naming – Process of deciding a brand name for a product
