= Per Andersen =

Norwegian brain researcher (1930–2020)

- Born: 12 January 1930
- Died: 17 February 2020 (aged 90)
- Scientific career
- Fields: Neuroscience

Per Oskar Andersen ForMemRS (12 January 1930 – 17 February 2020) was a Norwegian brain researcher at the University of Oslo. Research by his lab, specifically by Terje Lømo (and Timothy Bliss, who helped characterize the phenomenon years later), led to the discovery of long-term potentiation in 1966.

He was a fellow of the Norwegian Academy of Science and Letters and the Royal Society. He held honorary degrees at the University of Zürich and the Stockholm University.

He resided in Blommenholm.

Awards
Preceded by Ivan Th. Rosenqvist	Recipient of the Fridtjof Nansen Excellent Research Award in Science; 1972	Succeeded by Jens Lothe
