= Karel Svoboda (scientist) =

Czech neuroscientist (born 1965)

- Born: 1965 (age 60–61); Czech Republic
- Education: Cornell University (B.S.), Harvard University (Ph.D.)
- Scientific career
- Fields: Neuroscience
- Workplaces: Janelia Research Campus Allen Institute
- Website: www.janelia.org/lab/svoboda-lab

Karel Svoboda (born 1965) is a neuroscientist. His research focuses on the question of how the neural circuits of the brain produce behavior. He has also performed notable work in molecular biophysics, neurotechnology, and neuroplasticity, particularly changes in the brain due to experience and learning. In 2021, he became the Vice President and Executive Director of the Allen Institute for Neural Dynamics.

== Education ==
Svoboda was born in 1965 in what is now the Czech Republic. Svoboda received his bachelor's degree in physics from Cornell University. He then studied biophysics at Harvard University and received his Ph.D. in 1994, working with Steven Block and Howard Berg. He was a postdoctoral fellow at Bell Laboratories with Winfried Denk and David Tank.

== Academic career ==
Svoboda was a professor at the Cold Spring Harbor Laboratory between 1997 and 2006 and was a Howard Hughes Medical Institute Investigator. He became a group leader at HHMI's then-new Janelia Research Campus when it opened in 2006. Svoboda is also an investigator with the Simons Foundation's Collaboration on the Global Brain.

As a graduate student, Svoboda performed measurements of the tiny steps and forces of single kinesin molecules. Svoboda's research group studies neuroplasticity by measuring the effects of experience and learning on neural connectivity. The group is particularly interested in somatosensation and short-term memory, studied in mice. The group also develops experimental methods for studying neural circuits in live animals and in tissues, and is particularly noted for its work in high-resolution optical imaging.

== Awards and honors ==
- Society for Neuroscience Young Investigator award (2004)
- Gill Young Investigator Award (2009)
- Lawrence C. Katz Prize, Duke University (2014)
- National Academy of Sciences (2015)
- Grete Lundbeck European Brain Research Prize (2015) (often known as the Brain Prize) by the Lundbeckfonden, a foundation supported by Lundbeck.
- National Academy of Sciences Pradel Award (2017)
