= Angelina Kakooza Mwesige =

Ugandan neurologist

Dr. Angelina Kakooza
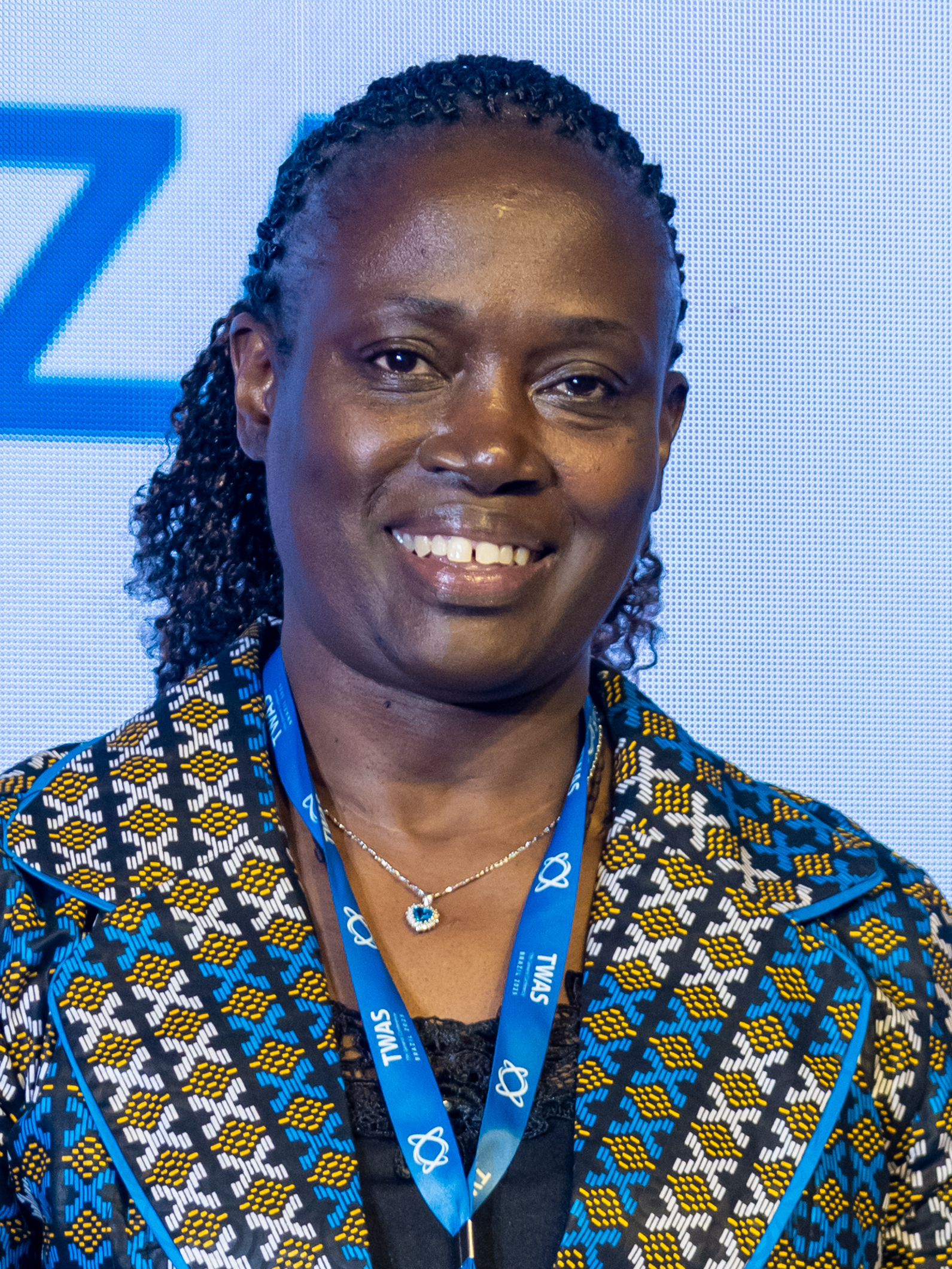
- Kakooza in 2025
- Born: Mulago Hospital
- Other name: Mwesige
- Citizenship: Ugandan
- Occupations: Doctor of medicine, Paediatrician, Associate Professor, and researcher
- Employer: Makerere University College of Health sciences
- Notable work: Her study and research on epilepsy and autism

Angelina Kakooza Mwesige is an Associate Professor and pediatric neurologist from Makerere University College of Health Sciences. She works in the Department of Pediatrics and Child Health, where she serves as a clinician, lecturer, and researcher with her primary focus being on neurodevelopmental disorders, with a special emphasis on conditions such as epilepsy, cerebral palsy, and autism, as well as infectious diseases like HIV/AIDS that affect neurological health in children.

== Background and education ==
Angelina Kakooza attended Mount Saint Mary's college, Namagunga, Lugazi for her secondary school education (1980–1986). She obtained her MB.Ch.B degree and completed residency in Pediatrics at Makerere University College in 1999.

She then trained in Epileptology and EEG at the Institute of Clinical Neurology Bologna, Italy in 2001. She also undertook several short courses in Neuroscience and Epilepsy conducted by the International Brain Research Organisation (IBRO) in conjunction with Society for Neuroscience in Africa at various training sites in Kenya and South Africa.

In 2016, she obtained her Doctorate in Medicine in the field of pediatric neurology as a joint degree between Makerere University College of Health Sciences, Uganda and Karolinska Institutet, Sweden for the dissertation on Cerebral palsy in Ugandan children.

== Career ==
Her professional path was significantly shaped by her personal experiences; her brother, who had autism, cerebral palsy, and epilepsy, died from Sudden Unexplained Death in Epilepsy (SUDEP), which drove her to enter the field of pediatric neurology. She earned her PhD through a joint program between Makerere University and the Karolinska Institute in Sweden, studying cerebral palsy in Ugandan children.

Beyond her academic and clinical work, she has held significant leadership roles, including serving as the Past President of the International League Against Epilepsy (ILAE) Africa region and chair of its Commission of African Affairs. She is also involved in various organizations, such as the African Child Neurology Association and Autism Speaks' Medical and Science Advisory Committee, contributing to global efforts to improve child health and epilepsy awareness in Africa. Her work bridges clinical care, research, and community engagement, often driven by a commitment to underserved populations.

== Positions held ==
Between 1993 and 1996, Angelina was the Medical Officer, Child Survival Training Unit, Department of Pediatrics and Child Health, Mulago National Referral Hospital. In 1996 to 1999, she was the Senior House Officer, Department of Pediatrics and Child Health, Mulago Referral Hospital. In 1999 to 2008, she was the Medical Officer Special Grade/Pediatrician, Department of Pediatrics and Child Health, Mulago Referral Hospital. In 2008 to 2016, she was a Lecturer/Child neurologist, Department of Pediatrics and Child Health, Makerere College of Health Sciences; Kampala, Uganda. From 2016 to date, she is a Senior Lecturer/ Child neurologist, Department of Pediatrics and Child Health, Makerere College of Health Sciences; Kampala, Uganda

== Other experiences ==
- President Epilepsy Society Uganda (EPISOU)-Uganda (branch of the ILAE).
- Member of Uganda Women Doctors Association.
- Member of Uganda Paediatric Association.
- Board member of African Child Neurology Association.
- Treasurer and founder member of the East African Academy on Childhood Disability. EAACD (Jan 2014 to date).
- Member of the American Academy for Cerebral Palsy and Developmental Medicine AACPDM (Sept 2014 to date).
- Board Member of the African Regional Committee of the International Brain Research Organization (IBRO-ARC) for period 2014–2018.

== Awards ==
Angelina Kakooza has received different awards through the course of her career. some of them have been listed here

1. Mentee Awardee –of the Collegium Internationale Neuropsychopharmacologicum (CINP) Research Mentor Program. June 2005 to June 2008.
2. American Epilepsy Society, (AES) International Scholarship Award. November–December 2005.This was undertaken at Children's Hospital Boston, USA
3. Honorary Mention for best Mentor-Mentee Pair Award, for Prof. Dirk Dhossche & Dr. Kakooza- Mwesige. Angelina at the 50th Anniversary of the CINP, XXVI CINP Congress Internationales congress, in Munich, Germany, July 2008. This award is given to the best mentee-mentor pair in the CINP mentor programme.
4. African Doctoral Dissertation Fellowship Award (ADDRF) award given to promising African researchers in their 2nd or 3rd year of their doctoral studies to enable them complete their studies. (May 2011–14).
5. The ‘Charles C. Shepard Science Award’ for demonstrating excellence in science from the U.S. Department of Health and Human Services, Centers for Disease Control and Prevention, Agency for Toxic Substance and Disease Registry. In recognition of our paper entitled “An Epidemiologic Investigation of Potential Risk Factors for Nodding Syndrome in Kitgum District, Uganda” PLoS One 2013; 8 (6): E667419. June 6, 2014.
6. WWN/SFN Collaborative Research Network Program (CRNP) Research Award.-award given to women scientists and seeks to establish partnerships between mid-career women neuroscientists with faculty positions at academic institutions in low and middle income countries (December 2014-December 2015).
7. AACPDM International scholarship award- this is an International Scholarship from the American Academy for Cerebral Palsy and Developmental Medicine (AACPDM) given to attend the 69th Annual Meeting in Austin, Texas, on October 21–24, 2015.
8. Community impact award; winner 2022 for epilepsy foundation.
9. Inaugural Bass connection leadership award
