= Graham Collingridge =

British neuroscientist

Graham Leon Collingridge CBE FRS
- Born: February 1, 1955
- Education: University of Bristol (BSc), University College London (PhD)
- Occupations: neuroscientist, professor
- Employer(s): University of Toronto; University of Bristol
- Known for: research on synaptic plasticity
- Awards: Commander of the Order of the British Empire (2019); Brain Prize

Graham Leon Collingridge CBE FRS (born 1 February 1955) is a British neuroscientist and professor at the University of Toronto and at the University of Bristol. He is also a senior investigator at the Lunenfeld-Tanenbaum Research Institute, Mount Sinai Hospital in Toronto.

Collingridge's research focuses on the mechanisms of synaptic plasticity in health and disease, in particular, understanding synaptic plasticity in molecular terms and how pathological alterations in these processes may lead to major brain disorders, such as Alzheimer's disease. He was with Professors Tim Bliss and Richard Morris as the first UK scientists to share the Brain Prize.

== Life ==
Collingridge was educated at Enfield Grammar School and earned his undergraduate degree in pharmacology from University of Bristol and a PhD from the School of Pharmacy (University College London). He was a postdoctoral fellow in the department of physiology at the University of British Columbia (Vancouver, Canada) and in the department of physiology and pharmacology at the University of New South Wales (Sydney, Australia). In 1983 he was appointed to a lectureship at the department of pharmacology at the University of Bristol. From 1990 until 1994 he was the departmental chair in pharmacology at the University of Birmingham (UK). In 1994 he returned to the University of Bristol as the professor of neuroscience in anatomy. There he served as departmental chair of anatomy (1997–1999) and then as the director of the MRC Centre for Synaptic Plasticity (1999–2012). He currently holds an appointment in the school of physiology, pharmacology and neuroscience at the University of Bristol, UK. From 2015 to 2019 Collingridge served as the Ernest B. and Leonard B. Smith Professor and Chair of the Department of Physiology at the University of Toronto, Canada.

Collingridge has held visiting professorships at the University of British Columbia and at Seoul National University. He served as editor-in-chief of Neuropharmacology from 1993 until 2010. In 1997 he was elected a founder fellow of the European DANA Alliance; and in 1998 he was elected a founder fellow of the Academy of Medical Sciences (UK). In 2001 he was elected a Fellow of The Royal Society, and from 2007 until 2009 he served as president of the British Neuroscience Association (BNA). He is currently the president of the Canadian Physiological Society (CPS) and a reviews editor for the scientific journal Molecular Brain.

He is currently the director of the Tanz Centre for Research in Neurodegenerative Diseases and a holds the Krembil Family Chair in Alzheimer's Research in the department of physiology at the University of Toronto. He is also a senior investigator at the Lunenfeld-Tanenbaum Research Institute, Mount Sinai Hospital in Toronto. Collingridge also holds an appointment in the school of physiology, pharmacology and neuroscience at the University of Bristol, UK.

Collingridge is a member of the scientific advisory board of HelloBio Ltd., a supplier of biotechnology tools, based in Bristol, UK.

He was appointed Commander of the Order of the British Empire (CBE) in the 2019 Birthday Honours for services to biomedical sciences.

== Honours and awards ==
1. 1992 Sharpey-Shafer Prize (The Physiological Society)
2. 1997 Founder Fellow, European DANA Alliance
3. 1998 Founder Fellow, Academy of Medical Sciences
4. 2001 Elected Fellow, The Royal Society
5. 2003 Gaddam Memorial Prize (The Pharmacological Society)
6. 2007 President, British Neuroscience Association
7. 2008 The Santiago Grisolia Prize
8. 2013 The Feldberg Prize
9. 2016 The Brain Prize, European Brain Research Foundation
