= Ole Kiehn =

Danish-Swedish neuroscientist (born 1958)

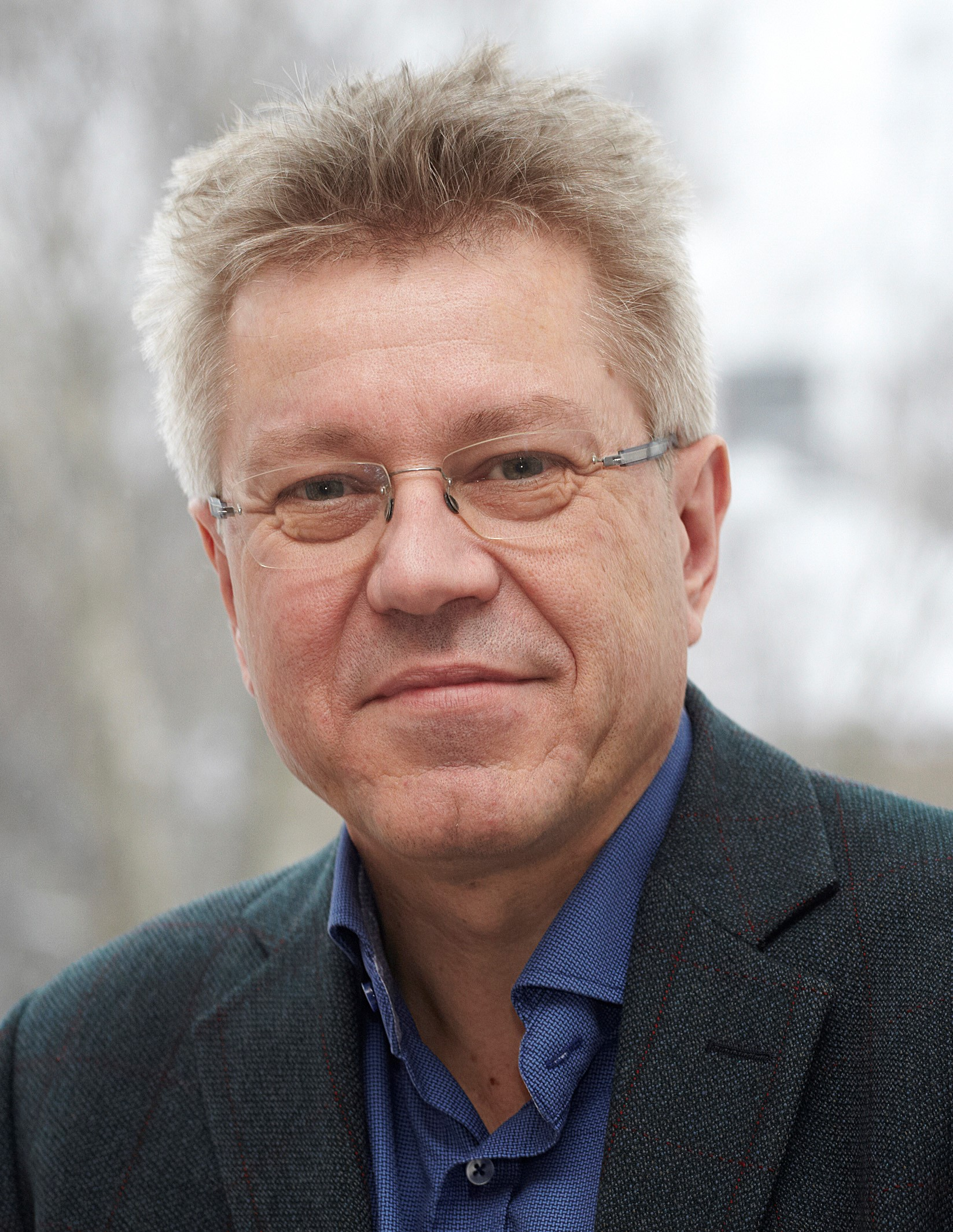
- Danish - Swedish neuroscientist
- Born: 1958 (age 67–68); Nakskov, Denmark
- Occupations: Neuroscientist and professor

Ole Kiehn (born 1958) is a Danish-Swedish neuroscientist. He is Professor of Integrative Neuroscience at the Department of Neuroscience, University of Copenhagen, Denmark, and professor of neurophysiology at Karolinska Institute, Sweden.

== Early life and education ==
Kiehn was born 1958 in Nakskov, Denmark. He earned his medical degree in 1985 and his Doctorate in Science (D.Sci.) in 1990, both from the University of Copenhagen.

== Career ==
From 1985 to 1989 Kiehn worked as a research associate at the Institute of Neurophysiology, University of Copenhagen. He spent 1989-90 working as a Postdoc at the Section of Neurobiology and Behavior at Cornell University, US, before returning to Denmark to become a group leader at the Institute of Neurophysiology at University of Copenhagen (1991–95). From 1995 to 2000, he was employed as a Hallas Møller Research Fellow at Department of Physiology, University of Copenhagen, and in 1997 he became associate professor at the same place, a position that he held until he was recruited to Karolinska Institute in Sweden in 2001. Since 2004, Ole Kiehn is working as professor in neuroscience at the Department of Neuroscience at Karolinska Institute. From 2003 to 2011 he was deputy chair of the Department of Neuroscience, Karolinska Institute. In 2008 Kiehn became a member of the Nobel Assembly at the Karolinska Institute and after serving as an adjunct member from 2011 to 2014, he was elected as a member of the Nobel Committee for Physiology or Medicine in 2014 to 2019. From 2024 - 2026 Ole Kiehn serves as President of Federation of European Neuroscience Societies (FENS).

Since 2017, Ole Kiehn is also employed as professor in Integrative Neuroscience at the Department of Neuroscience, University of Copenhagen. Since 2019, Kiehn is co-editor in chief of Current Opinion in Neurobiology.

== Work ==
Kiehn has published over 120 original papers and reviews and his work has been reported in scientific journals, including Nature (journal), Science (journal), Cell (journal), Nature Neuroscience, Neuron (journal), PNAS, Nature Reviews Neuroscience among others. Kiehn's work has elucidated the functional organization of neuronal circuits controlling movement. In his initial work he showed that vertebrate motor neurons can express transmitter-modulated plateau potentials. His continued work has shown an involvement of plateaux in disturbed motor symptoms seen after spinal cord injury. Using molecular mouse genetic, electrophysiology and behavioral studies he has revealed the key cellular organization of spinal locomotor networks and was able to functionally discover and link specific neuronal populations in the spinal cord to the ability to produce the alternating movements between limbs during locomotion and to set the rhythm of locomotion. Kiehn has also discovered specific populations of excitatory brainstem neurons that mediate the episodic control of locomotion: the start and stop of locomotion as well as turning. These studies unravel the communication pathway between the brain and the spinal cord needed to control the expression of locomotion.

== Awards and honors ==
- 2026: Anders Jahre biomedical Prize
- 2026: Lundbeck Foundation's Professorship award
- 2024: Novo Nordic Foundation's Laureate program award
- 2022: The Brain Prize
- 2021: Kirsten and Freddy Johansen's preclinical prize (KFJ prize)
- 2019: Lundbeck Foundation's Professorship award
- 2017: Novo Nordic Foundation's Laureate program award
- 2015: European Research Council Advanced Grant
- 2014: Member of the European Molecular Biology Organization (EMBO)
- 2013: Member of Academia Europaea
- 2012: Member of the Royal Swedish Academy of Sciences
- 2010: Member of the Royal Danish Academy of Sciences and Letters
- 2010: Torsten Söderberg's Professorship
- 2010: European Research Council Advanced Grant
- 2010: Distinguished Professor Award at Karolinska Institute
- 2004: Schellenberg Prize in spinal cord research
- 1995: Hallas Møller Research Fellowship
