= Jennifer Ailshire =

Educator and scholar (born)

Academic background
- Education: University of Michigan (PhD) Arizona State University (BA)

Academic work
- Discipline: Sociology/Demography
- Institutions: USC Leonard Davis School of Gerontology

Jennifer Ailshire is a sociologist and demographer whose research focuses on aging and how environmental and social factors influence health. She is a professor of gerontology and spatial sciences at the University of Southern California. She serves as Associate Dean of Research as well as Associate Dean of International Programs and Global Initiatives at the USC Leonard Davis School of Gerontology, where she also holds the UPS Foundation Chair in Aging and Justice.

== Biography ==
After graduating summa cum laude with a BA in sociology from Arizona State University in 2003, Ailshire completed a PhD in sociology with an emphasis in demography at the University of Michigan. She began postdoctoral research at USC under the mentorship of Eileen Crimmins in 2009 and was appointed as an assistant professor in the USC Leonard Davis School in 2014. In 2020, she was granted tenure and the title of associate professor.

== Research ==
Ailshire's research focuses on how neighborhood environments, including physical and social factors, affect health and aging. She is a co-investigator of the Health and Retirement Study.

In 2021, Ailshire and USC Leonard Davis School colleague Caleb Finch independently published studies linking air pollution to higher risk of cognitive decline. Later that year, Ailshire and Finch coauthored a research letter that noted how decreasing levels of PM2.5 pollution, particles often found in industrial and automobile exhaust that are small enough to pass through the blood-brain barrier, correlate with reduced risk of cognitive deficits.

A widely publicized February 2025 study Ailshire authored with postdoctoral researcher Eunyoung Choi linked increased days of excess heat with faster biological aging in older adults.
