= Socioemotional selectivity theory =

Theory of motivation

Socioemotional selectivity theory (SST; developed by Stanford psychologist Laura L. Carstensen) is a life-span theory of motivation. The theory maintains that as time horizons shrink, as they typically do with age, people become increasingly selective, investing greater resources in emotionally meaningful goals and activities. According to the theory, motivational shifts also influence cognitive processing. Aging is associated with a relative preference for positive over negative information in individuals who have had rewarding relationships. This selective narrowing of social interaction maximizes positive emotional experiences and minimizes emotional risks as individuals become older. According to this theory, older adults systematically hone their social networks so that available social partners satisfy their emotional needs.

The theory also focuses on the types of goals that individuals are motivated to achieve. Knowledge-related goals aim at knowledge acquisition, career planning, the development of new social relationships and other endeavors that will pay off in the future. Emotion-related goals are aimed at emotion regulation, the pursuit of emotionally gratifying interactions with social partners and other pursuits whose benefits can be realized in the present.

When people perceive their future as open ended, they tend to focus on future-oriented and development- or knowledge-related goals, but when they feel that time is running out and the opportunity to reap rewards from future-oriented goals' realization is dwindling, their focus tends to shift towards present-oriented and emotion- or pleasure-related goals. Research on this theory often compares age groups (e.g., young adulthood vs. old adulthood), but the shift in goal priorities is a gradual process that begins in early adulthood. Importantly, the theory contends that the cause of these goal shifts is not age itself, i.e., not the passage of time itself, but rather an age-associated shift in time perspective.

This justified shift in perspective is the rational equivalent of the psychological perceptual disorder known as "foreshortened future," in which an individual, usually a young and physically healthy individual, unreasonably believes (either consciously or unconsciously) that their time horizons are more limited than they actually are, with the effect that the individual undervalues long-term goals and long-run pleasure and instead disproportionately pursues short-term goals and pleasure, thereby diverting resources from investment for the future and often even actively reducing their long-term prospects.

The thought of nearing “the end” leads to an increased orientation toward social and emotional targets. Here, “the end” signifies death, which is generally associated with chronological old age. However, it would be inaccurate to limit old age to chronological aging because one’s chronological age does not reveal any information about one’s health, personality, cognitive development, role in social life, and social status. Evaluating old age within the framework of various biological, psychological, and sociological factors makes it easier for researchers to obtain more detailed and specific results. Regardless of the characteristics selected to assess old age, it is possible to say that aging has biological, physiological, psychological, and sociological impacts on individuals, either positive or negative.

== Cross-cultural incidence ==
Researchers have found that across diverse samples – ranging from Norwegians to Catholic nuns to African-Americans to Chinese Americans to European-Americans – older adults report better control of their emotions and fewer negative emotions than do younger adults. At the same time, culture seems to color how aging-related effects impact one's emotional life: Whereas older Americans were shown to de-emphasize negative experiences more than younger Americans, no such effect has been observed in Japan. Instead, older Japanese were shown to assign a greater value to positive aspects of otherwise negative experiences than younger Japanese, whereas no such effect has been observed in the U.S.

== Positivity effect in older adults ==
=== In perception ===
Studies have found that older adults are more likely than younger adults to pay more attention to positive than to negative stimuli (as assessed by the dot-probe paradigm and eye-tracking methods). However, the effect also differs across cultures. For example, Hong Kong Chinese looked away from happy stimuli and more towards fearful stimuli, and the difference in attention pattern was related to differences in self-construal.

=== In recall ===
The term positivity effect also refers to age differences in emotional attention and memory. As people get older, they experience fewer negative emotions and they tend to look to the past in a positive light. In addition, compared with younger adults' memories, older adults' memories are more likely to consist of positive than negative information and more likely to be distorted in a positive direction. This version of the positivity effect was coined by Laura L. Carstensen's research team. There is a debate about the cross-cultural generalizability of the aging-related positivity effect, with some evidence for different types of emotional processing among Americans as compared to Japanese.

==== Hypothesized causes ====
One theory of the positivity effect in older adults' memories is that it is produced by cognitive control mechanisms that improve and decrease negative information due to older adults' greater focus on emotional regulation. Research shows an age-related reversal in the valence of information processed within the medial prefrontal cortex (MPFC). In younger adults, more MPFC activity was found in the presence of negative stimuli compared to positive stimuli whereas in older adults this was reversed.

However, the positivity effect may be different for stimuli processed automatically (pictures) and stimuli processed in a more controlled manner (words). Compared to words, pictures tend to be processed more rapidly and they engage emotion processing centres earlier. Automatic stimuli are processed in the amygdala and dorsal MPFC, whereas controlled stimuli are processed in the temporal pole and ventral MPFC. Compared to younger adults, older adults showed less amygdala activation and more MPFC activation for negative than positive pictures. Increased motivation to regulate emotion leads older adults to actively engage the mPFC differently from younger adults, which in turn yields diverging amygdala activation patterns. The opposite pattern was observed for words. Although older adults showed a positivity effect in memory for words, they did not display one for pictures. Thus, the positivity effect may arise from ageing differences in MPFC use during encoding.

Recent study by Helene Fung's group in China University in Hong Kong and Deep Longevity utilized artificial intelligence to show that people who are unhappy and lonely have accelerated biological age.

== See also ==
- Aging and memory
- Negativity bias
- Positivity effect

== Sources ==
- Carstensen, L. L. (1992). "Motivation for social contact across the life span: A theory of socioemotional selectivity". Nebraska Symposium on Motivation. 40: 209–54. PMID 1340521.
- Carstensen, Laura L.; Isaacowitz, Derek M.; Charles, Susan T. (1999). "Taking time seriously: A theory of socioemotional selectivity". American Psychologist. 54 (3): 165–81. doi:10.1037/0003-066X.54.3.165. PMID 10199217.
- Lockenhoff, Corinna E.; Carstensen, Laura L. (2004). "Socioemotional Selectivity Theory, Aging, and Health: The Increasingly Delicate Balance Between Regulating Emotions and Making Tough Choices". Journal of Personality. 72 (6): 1395–424. CiteSeerX 10.1.1.319.121. doi:10.1111/j.1467-6494.2004.00301.x. PMID 15509287.
- Fung, Helene H.; Carstensen, Laura L. (2004). "Motivational Changes in Response to Blocked Goals and Foreshortened Time: Testing Alternatives to Socioemotional Selectivity Theory". Psychology and Aging. 19 (1): 68–78. doi:10.1037/0882-7974.19.1.68. PMID 15065932.
- Pruzan, Katherine; Isaacowitz, Derek M. (2006). "An Attentional Application of Socioemotional Selectivity Theory in College Students". Social Development. 15 (2): 326. doi:10.1046/j.1467-9507.2006.00344.x.
- Carstensen, Laura L.; Mikels, Joseph A. (2005). "At the Intersection of Emotion and Cognition. Aging and the Positivity Effect". Current Directions in Psychological Science. 14 (3): 117. CiteSeerX 10.1.1.551.1460. doi:10.1111/j.0963-7214.2005.00348.x. S2CID 59067078.
- Reed, A. E.; Carstensen, L. L. (2012). "The Theory Behind the Age-Related Positivity Effect". Frontiers in Psychology. 3: 339. doi:10.3389/fpsyg.2012.00339. PMC 3459016. PMID 23060825.
