= Valter Longo =

Italian cellular biologist (born 1967)

Valter D. Longo
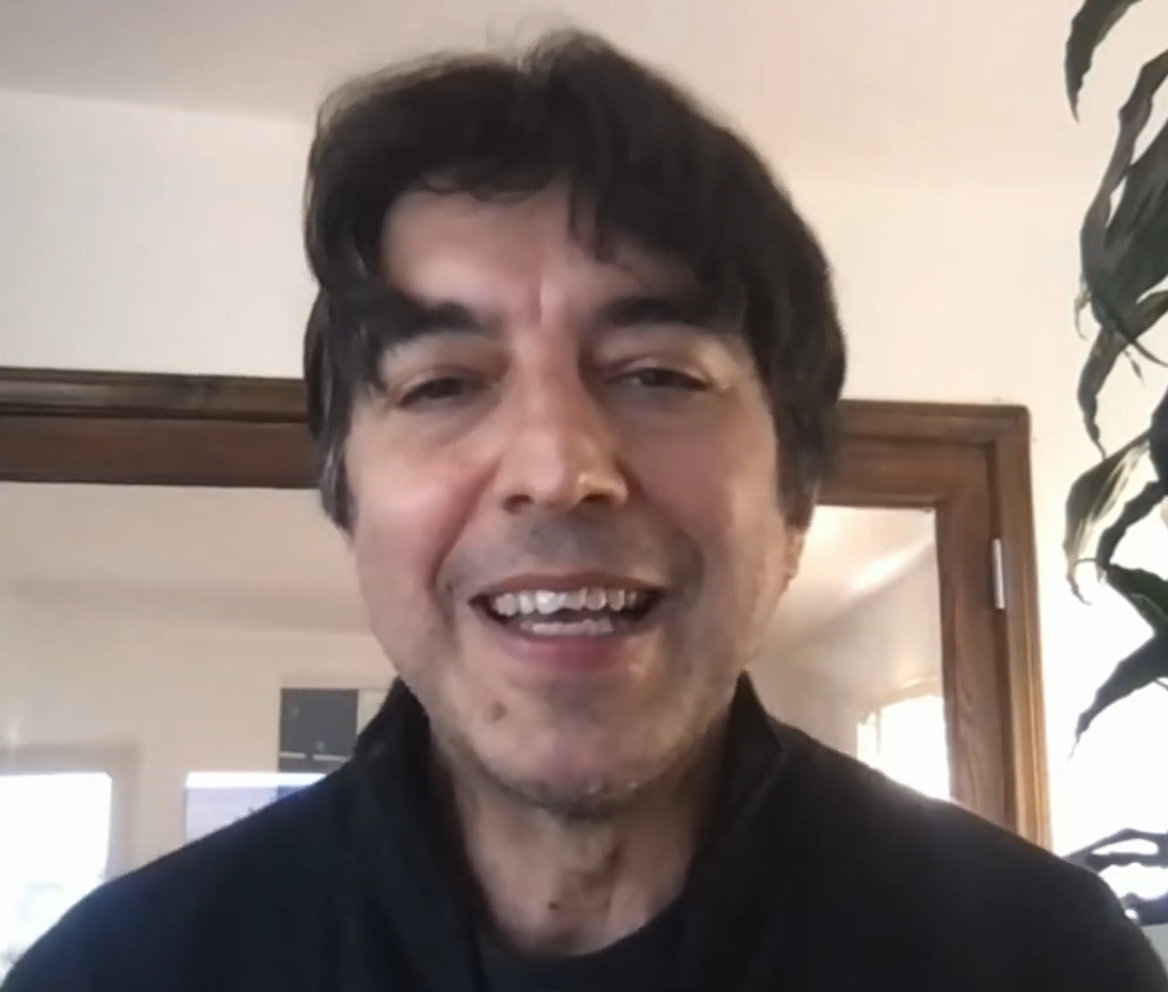
- Born: 1967 (age 58–59); Genoa, Italy
- Education: University of North Texas (BS); University of California, Los Angeles (PhD); University of Southern California (Postdoc)
- Known for: The Longevity Diet (2018)
- Scientific career
- Fields: Cell biology Biogerontology
- Institutions: USC Davis School of Gerontology
- Doctoral advisor: Joan Valentine

Valter D. Longo (born 1967) is an Italian-American biogerontologist and cell biologist known for his studies on the role of fasting and nutrient response genes on cellular protection aging and diseases and for proposing that longevity is regulated by similar genes and mechanisms in many eukaryotes. He is currently a professor at the USC Davis School of Gerontology with a joint appointment in the department of Biological Sciences as well as serving as the director of the USC Longevity Institute.

== Early life and education ==
Valter Longo was born into a Calabrian family in the northern Italian city of Genoa in 1967. As a child, he spent much of his time imitating Jimi Hendrix's guitar-playing style. At the age of 16, he moved to Chicago to study jazz guitar, and lived with extended relatives. While there, he observed that his relatives in the United States were genetically similar to his family back home, but many of them were suffering from diabetes and cardiovascular disease due to diets rich in fat, meat, and sugar. Three years later, he transferred to the University of North Texas College of Music to study jazz under Jack Petersen. To pay for his tuition, he worked at a gas station, repaired roofs, sold water filtration equipment, and joined the army as a reserve tank driver, narrowly avoiding deployment to combat during the 1991 Gulf War. During his second year of music, Longo was selected to direct the university's marching band—an assignment he considered humiliating for someone aspiring to be a rock star. Consequently, he decided to shift his focus to studying nutrition and longevity. He graduated from the University of North Texas in 1992.

In 1992 he joined the laboratory of calorie restriction pioneer Roy Walford at UCLA where he studied calorie restriction and aging of the immune system. While Longo sees Walford as a pioneer, he describes the extreme diet Walford advocated as a "little crazy," as it severely restricted food intake during Walford’s time in the experimental habitat of Biosphere 2. "When they exited Biosphere, they looked liked hell," Longo said. "Walford looked like a skeleton." He completed his PhD work in Biochemistry studying antioxidant enzymes and anti-aging genes under Joan Valentine at University of California, Los Angeles in 1997, and his postdoctoral training under Caleb Finch at the University of Southern California.

== Career ==
Valter Longo is the Edna M. Jones Professor of Gerontology and Biological Sciences, as well as the director of the Longevity Institute at the Leonard Davis School of Gerontology at the University of Southern California, and the Longevity and Cancer Program at the IFOM Institute of Molecular Oncology in Milan, Italy. In 2018, Longo led a team of researchers from the University of Southern California and Harvard University, focusing on interventions to protect against aging and disease. The team received a new $10 million grant from the National Institute on Aging.

== Personal life and diet ==
As of January 2018, Valter Longo was not married and had no children. He stated: "I'm dedicated to what I do and involved in many clinical trials." In October 2025, he had a son.

With regard to longevity, Longo promotes a mostly plant-based diet and eats fish no more than two or three times per week. In addition, he suggests implementing time-restricted eating, with daily eating windows of 11–12 hours. His research is focused on the fasting-mimicking diet (FMD). The FMD is a low-calorie, low-protein, moderate-carbohydrate, moderate-fat plant-based diet program, that he argues mimics the effects of periodic fasting or water fasting. The course lasts five days, while still aiming to provide the body with nutrition, and is considered a periodic fast. Longo stated that the purpose of creating FMD was not to promote weight loss but to help end the global medical culture centered on pill consumption. He described this system as "prehistoric, it’s expensive, and it’s making us all broke." Longo founded the biotechnology company L-Nutra and developed the ProLon fasting-mimicking diet. MIT Technology Review reported that while ProLon was a commercial success, Longo was concerned about its potential impact on his scientific reputation. In 2017, after a series of articles about the product—one of which described him as sounding like a "snake oil salesman"—he announced that he would no longer accept consulting fees and would donate his company shares to charity.

== Related media ==
In 2011, Longo was profiled on Through the Wormhole for his longevity-related research. A year later, he discussed his fasting research with Michael Mosley in an episode of the BBC documentary series, Horizon called, Eat, Fast, and Live Longer. According to The Independent, the programme gave rise to the 5:2 diet and introduced the concept of intermittent fasting to a global audience.

His appearances and interviews in documentaries and TV series include the 2012 movie Science of Fasting, the 2020 series The Goop Lab, and Down to Earth with Zac Efron. Longo's studies on fasting inspired the documentary Fasting and The Longevity Revolution, narrated by Edward Norton and directed by Academy Award-nominated Barry Alexander Brown.

== Bibliography ==
Type	Title	Year	Publisher	Identifier	Ref.
Books	The Longevity Diet	2018	Avery Publishing	Paperback: ISBN 978-1-4059-3394-0; Hardcover: ISBN 978-0-525-53407-5	
Books	Fasting Cancer: How Fasting and Nutritechnology Are Creating a Revolution in Cancer Prevention and Treatment	2025	Avery Publishing	Hardcover: ISBN 978-0-593-54532-4	

== Accolades ==
In 2018, Valter Longo was named one of the fifty most influential people in health care by Time, which called him "the fasting evangelist", and in 2021 Science called him a pioneer in the nutrition and cancer field. Longo is also on Clarivate's list of Highly Cited Researchers for 2021–25.

Organizations	Year	Category	Ref.
American Federation for Aging Research	2012	Vincent Cristofalo Rising Star Award in Aging Research	
Associazione Incontriamoci Sempre	2018	Premio Simpatia	
Chalmers University of Technology	2016	Jubilee Professorship	
Dutch Society on Ageing Research	2016	Boerhaave Professorship	
Glenn Foundation for Medical Research	2016	Glenn Award for Research in the Biology of Aging	
Goethe University Frankfurt	2016	Friedrich Merz Guest Professorship	
Maria Buchinger Foundation	2013	Maria Buchinger Foundation Award	
National Institutes of Health	2010	Nathan Shock Lecture Award	
USC Leonard Davis School of Gerontology	2017	USC Stevens Center for Innovation Commercialization Awards	
