= Laura L. Carstensen =

American psychologist

Laura L. Carstensen is the Fairleigh S. Dickinson Jr. Professor in Public Policy and professor of psychology at Stanford University, where she is founding director of the Stanford Center on Longevity and the principal investigator for the Stanford Life-span Development Laboratory. Carstensen is best known in academia for socioemotional selectivity theory, which has illuminated developmental changes in social preferences, emotional experience and cognitive processing from early adulthood to advanced old age. By examining postulates of socioemotional selectivity theory, Carstensen and her colleagues (most notably Mara Mather) identified and developed the conceptual basis of the positivity effect.

== Biography ==
Carstensen was born in Philadelphia, Pennsylvania and spent most of her childhood in Rochester, New York. She graduated from the University of Rochester in 1978 and earned her Ph.D. in psychology from West Virginia University in 1983. She served as assistant professor of psychology at Indiana University from 1983 to 1987, and then joined Stanford University's department of psychology in 1987. In addition to her role as professor of psychology, she served as the Barbara D. Finberg director of the Clayman Institute for Gender Research from 1997 to 2001 and chair of the psychology department from 2004 to 2006. With Thomas Rando, Carstensen founded the Stanford Center on Longevity in 2007, where she currently serves as its director.

Carstensen is considered a thought leader on longevity. Her essays and opinion pieces have appeared in the New York Times, Time Magazine, and The Boston Globe. Her TED talk has been viewed more than a million times. In 2011 she published A Long Bright Future: Happiness, Health and Financial Security in an Era of Increased Longevity.

== Selected awards and honors ==
- Kleemeier Award, Gerontological Society of America (2014)
- Distinguished Mentor Award, Gerontological Society of America (2014)
- Master Mentorship Award, American Psychological Association (Division 20) (2010)
- Guggenheim Fellow, Guggenheim Foundation (2003)
- Kalish Innovative Publication Award, Gerontological Society of America (1993)

== Research contributions ==
=== Socioemotional selectivity theory ===
Carstensen originally formulated socioemotional selectivity theory (SST) in the early 1990s. SST is a life-span theory of motivation which posits that people prioritize emotionally meaningful goals when time horizons are constrained. According to SST, people with expansive time horizons are more likely to prioritize exploration and expanding horizons, seeking out new relationships that promise long-term benefits. In contrast, as time horizons grow limited people prioritize emotionally meaningful goals that are more likely to result in feelings of emotional satisfaction. Consequently, people with limited time horizons tend to have smaller, more carefully selected social networks and experience better emotional well-being.

=== Positivity effect ===
Carstensen is responsible for identifying and developing the conceptual basis for the positivity effect, an age-related trend in cognitive processing that favors positive over negative information in attention and memory. A meta-analysis of 100 empirical studies of the positivity effect found that this effect is larger in studies that include wider age comparisons and do not constrain cognitive processing.

=== Future time perspective scale ===
The future time perspective (FTP) scale was developed by Carstensen and Frieder Lang. The FTP scale includes ten items answered by indicating agreement on a 7-point Likert-type scale (from 1= very untrue, to 7 = very true). The last three items of the future time perspective scale (#s 8–10) are reverse coded. When scoring the measure, researchers calculate the participant's mean score. Prior research shows a linear relationship between chronological age and time horizons. The strength of the relationship varies as a function of the age range in the sample: nearly always, the relationship is positive, with high scores indicative of long time horizons.

== Selected publications ==
- Carstensen, L. L.; Isaacowitz, D.; Charles, S. T. (1999). "Taking time seriously: A theory of socioemotional selectivity". American Psychologist. 54 (3): 165–181. doi:10.1037/0003-066X.54.3.165. PMID 10199217.
- Lang, F. R.; Carstensen, L. L. (2002). "Time counts: Future time perspective, goals and social relationships". Psychology and Aging. 17 (1): 125–139. doi:10.1037/0882-7974.17.1.125. PMID 11931281.
- Mather, M.; Carstensen, L. L. (2005). "Aging and motivated cognition: The positivity effect in attention and memory". Trends in Cognitive Sciences. 9 (10): 496–502. doi:10.1016/j.tics.2005.08.005. PMID 16154382. S2CID 17433910.
- Carstensen, L. L. (2006). "The influence of a sense of time on human development". Science. 312 (5782): 1913–1915. Bibcode:2006Sci...312.1913C. doi:10.1126/science.1127488. PMC 2790864. PMID 16809530.
- Carstensen, L. L.; Turan, B.; Scheibe, S.; Ram, N.; Ersner-Hershfield, H.; Samanez-Larkin, G.; Brooks, K.; Nesselroad, J. R. (2011). "Emotional experience improves with age: Evidence based on over 10 years of experience sampling". Psychology and Aging. 26 (1): 21–33. doi:10.1037/a0021285. PMC 3217179. PMID 20973600.

== See also ==
- Socioemotional Selectivity Theory
- Positivity effect
