= Edward L. Schneider =

American scientist

Edward L. Schneider is a Professor of Gerontology at the USC Leonard Davis School of Gerontology, Professor of Medicine at the Keck School of Medicine of USC, with a joint appointment in biological sciences and molecular biology at the Dornsife College of Letters, Arts and Sciences.

== Biography ==
He attended Rensselaer Polytechnic Institute and went on to graduate cum laude from the Boston University School of Medicine. Upon completion of medical school, Schneider received the Distinguished Alumnus Award in May 1990. In 1986, Schneider joined the faculty at the USC Leonard Davis School of Gerontology. Previously, he was the deputy director of the National Institute on Aging and the Chief of the Laboratory of Molecular Genetics, Gerontology Research Center, National Institute on Aging. At the National Institute on Aging, Schneider and his colleagues were instrumental in creating the first national Alzheimer's Disease Research Centers (ADRCs), the first teaching nursing homes, and assisting in the development of geriatric programs throughout the United States. Schneider was Professor of Medicine and Director of the Davis Institute on Aging at the University of Colorado and founder of the Colorado Gerontological Society. Schneider played an important role in the creation of the Buck Institute for Research on Aging where he was the scientific director from 1989 to 1999 and worked with I. M. Pei on the design of the facility. Schneider was the first recipient of the William and Sylvia Kugel Dean's Chair of Gerontology at the University of Southern California. Schneider was the senior advisor for special projects for the Los Angeles Jewish Home. Schneider was also a consultant to many long-term care companies. He is currently a member of the board of directors of the Los Angeles Jewish Home and chairs their geriatrics board, their Brandman Centers for Senior Care board and their Geriatric Education and Research Organization board. Schneider researches molecular genetic aspects of cellular aging, DNA damage and repair with aging, and health care costs of an aging population. Some of his best known publications include the development with Dr. N. P. Singh of the “comet” assay for single cell DNA damage. Schneider is the chairperson of the advisory committee to the Los Angeles County Elder Abuse Forensic Center. Schneider has also been extensively involved in litigation concerning elder abuse working for both plaintiffs and defendants. He is an expert consultant the California Department of Justice and the California Department of Social Services.

Schneider has published over 180 research articles and 14 books including What the Doctor Hasn't Told You and What the Heath Store Clerk Doesn't Know (2006) with Leigh Ann Hirschman. Schneider is also the author of AgeLess: Take Control of Your Age and Stay Youthful for Life (2003) which is a recommended book by Project Renewment. Schneider has been interviewed by numerous media outlets, previously appearing on Larry King Live, Good Morning America, CNN, CBS, NBC, and BBC, and in print stories by Forbes, Newsweek, The New York Times, and The Wall Street Journal. Schneider has raced sailboats for several decades and was an offshore sailing coach for the United States Naval Academy sailing team.
