= Paul Wolff (screenwriter) =

American screenwriter-actor

Paul Wolff is an American screenwriter, actor, and producer. He taught screenwriting at the University of Southern California School of Cinematic Arts and retired in 2016 after serving on the faculty for over twenty years. Wolff previously had a career in television which spanned nearly three decades.

== Career ==
=== Writer, producer and actor ===
After graduating high school, Wolff joined the mailroom at United Artists in Manhattan. He was promoted to the publicity department where he became friends with fellow publicist, and future filmmaker Jonathan Demme. The two collaborated on Demme's first film as a director, a short called Good Morning, Steve, which Wolff wrote and starred in.

In 1968, Wolff produced a short film adaptation of Edgar Allen Poe's "Annabel Lee", which starred a young Paul LeMat and was acquired by Warner Brothers and theatrically released in 1969.

In the 1970s, Wolff was a writer on the TV series Family. He later wrote for such TV shows as Little House on the Prairie, Family Ties, Fame, Remington Steele (starring Pierce Brosnan), and Home Improvement. Wolff also worked as a television producer and showrunner, and along with partner Elliot Shoenman, co-created and executive produced the short-lived series Annie McGuire starring Mary Tyler Moore. He later served as a producer and director on the early 1990s series Life Goes On.

=== Other endeavors ===
In addition to teaching a variety of screenwriting courses at the University of Southern California School of Cinematic Arts, Wolff also served on the film school's foreign delegations to both Jordan and Vietnam, where he led workshops in screenwriting, sponsored by the Ford Foundation.

Wolff was one of the founders of the Unica Film Collaborative, an experimental film group that focuses on the process of filmmaking, rather than the product. Unica's first feature film, Blue in Green, was chosen by Los Angeles Times film critic Kevin Thomas to screen at the LA Cinematheque's Alternative Film Festival.

In 2008, Wolff co-starred in the independent feature film Father vs. Son, also starring actor Eric Stonestreet.

Outside of his work in the entertainment industry, Wolff was ordained as a Maggid (a Jewish teacher-storyteller) by Rabbis Jonathan Omer-man and Zalman Schachter-Shalomi, and was chronicled in Rodger Kamenetz best-selling book Stalking Elijah (HarperOne, 1997). In 1994, he was recommended by Rabbi Schachter-Shalomi to the Los Angeles Jewish Home to help the extreme aged find hope and purpose in the latter stages of life. His "Meaning of Life" group ran for over 20 years.

In Over the Top Judaism (University Press of America, 2003), author Elliot Gertel wrote that Wolff's "The Craftsman" episode of TV's Little House on the Prairie was "television's best exploration of Judaism."
