= London Guildhall University =

University in London from 1992 to 2002

Coordinates: 51.5177°N 0.0883°W

- Active: 1992–2002
- Affiliations: Coalition of Modern Universities
- Provost: Roderick C. Floud
- Location: City of London, United Kingdom
- Campus: 31 Jewry Street, EC3N 2EY

London Guildhall University was a university in the United Kingdom from 1992 to 2002, established when the City of London Polytechnic was awarded university status. On 1 August 2002, it merged with the University of North London to form London Metropolitan University. The former London Guildhall University premises now form the new university's City campus, situated on various sites in the City of London.

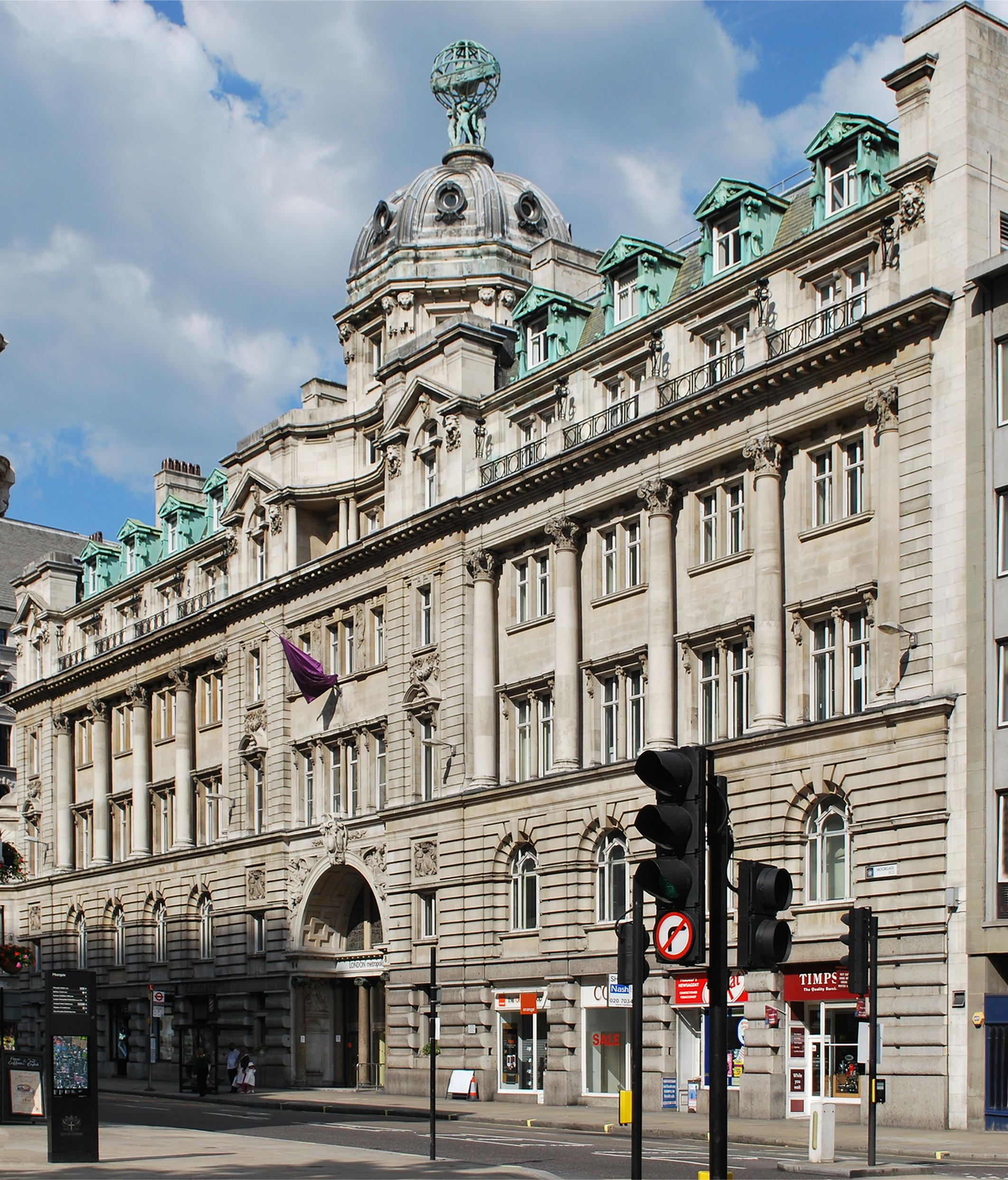
Electra House, Moorgate, built by John Belcher for Cable & Wireless in 1902.

== History ==
In 1848 Charles Blomfield, Bishop of London, called upon the clergy to establish evening classes to improve the moral, intellectual and spiritual condition of young men in London. In response, the Reverend Charles Mackenzie instituted the Metropolitan Evening Classes for Young Men in Crosby Hall, Bishopsgate, London, with student fees at one shilling per session. Subjects on the original curriculum included Greek, Latin, Hebrew, English, History, Mathematics, Drawing and Natural Philosophy. This fledgling college came under royal patronage following the visit of Prince Albert to the classes in 1851. In 1860 the classes moved to Sussex Hall, the former Livery Hall of the Bricklayers' Company, in Leadenhall Street. By this time, some 800 students were enrolled annually.

== City of London Polytechnic ==
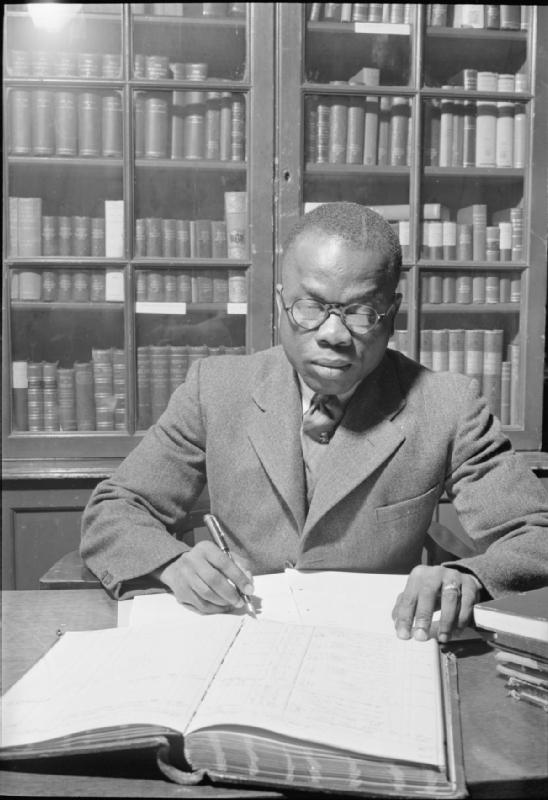
A student at the City of London College in 1946

In 1861 the classes were reconstituted as the City of London College. Over the next twenty years, the college was one of the pioneers in the introduction of commercial and technical subjects. The college built new premises in White Street at a cost of £16,000 (contributions were received from Queen Victoria and the Prince of Wales) and were opened in 1881. In 1891 the college joined the Birkbeck Institute (now Birkbeck College, University of London) and the Northampton Institute (now City University, London) to form the notional City Polytechnic by a Charity Commissioners' scheme to facilitate funding for these institutions by the City Parochial Foundation, and to enable the three institutions to work cooperatively. However this attempted federation did not function in practice, as each institution continued to operate more or less independently. The City Polytechnic concept was dissolved in 1906, and the City of London College came under the supervision of London County Council.

In December 1940 the college's building was destroyed by a German air raid. The college subsequently moved into premises at 84 Moorgate (now the Guildhall School of Business and Law) in 1944. The college celebrated its centenary in 1948 with a service of thanksgiving addressed by the Archbishop of Canterbury at St Paul's Cathedral.

In 1970 the college merged with the Sir John Cass College of Arts and Science to form the City of London Polytechnic, which remained under the control of the Inner London Education Authority (part of the Greater London Council) until the passing of the Education Reform Act 1988. The London College of Furniture was incorporated into the polytechnic in 1990.

== London Guildhall University ==
Under the Further and Higher Education Act 1992 the polytechnic was awarded university status, previously having awarded the degrees of the former Council for National Academic Awards. London Guildhall University was named to show its links with the City of London and the City's many guilds/livery companies. It was unassociated with the Guildhall School of Music and Drama, based at the Barbican Centre. LGU was ranked 30th out of the UK's 43 new universities in the 2001 Research Assessment Exercise. In August 2004, in the midst of a contract dispute with former LGU staff following the merger with the University of North London, it was reported that the management of the merged institution had ordered the destruction of the entire print run of a history of the university – London Guildhall University: From Polytechnic to University – authored by Sean Glynn, formerly a senior research fellow in the department of Politics and Modern History; the work had been commissioned by Sir Roderick Floud, the President of London Metropolitan University, when Provost of LGU.

Following the merger with North London, London Metropolitan became the largest unitary university in London. It includes the Sir John Cass School of Art, Architecture and Design and Sir John Cass Hall of Residence, so named because of the continued support of Sir John Cass's Foundation. In 2002, the unconnected City University Business School became the Sir John Cass Business School for similar reasons.

== See also ==
- Post-1992 university
