= Roderick Floud =

British economic historian

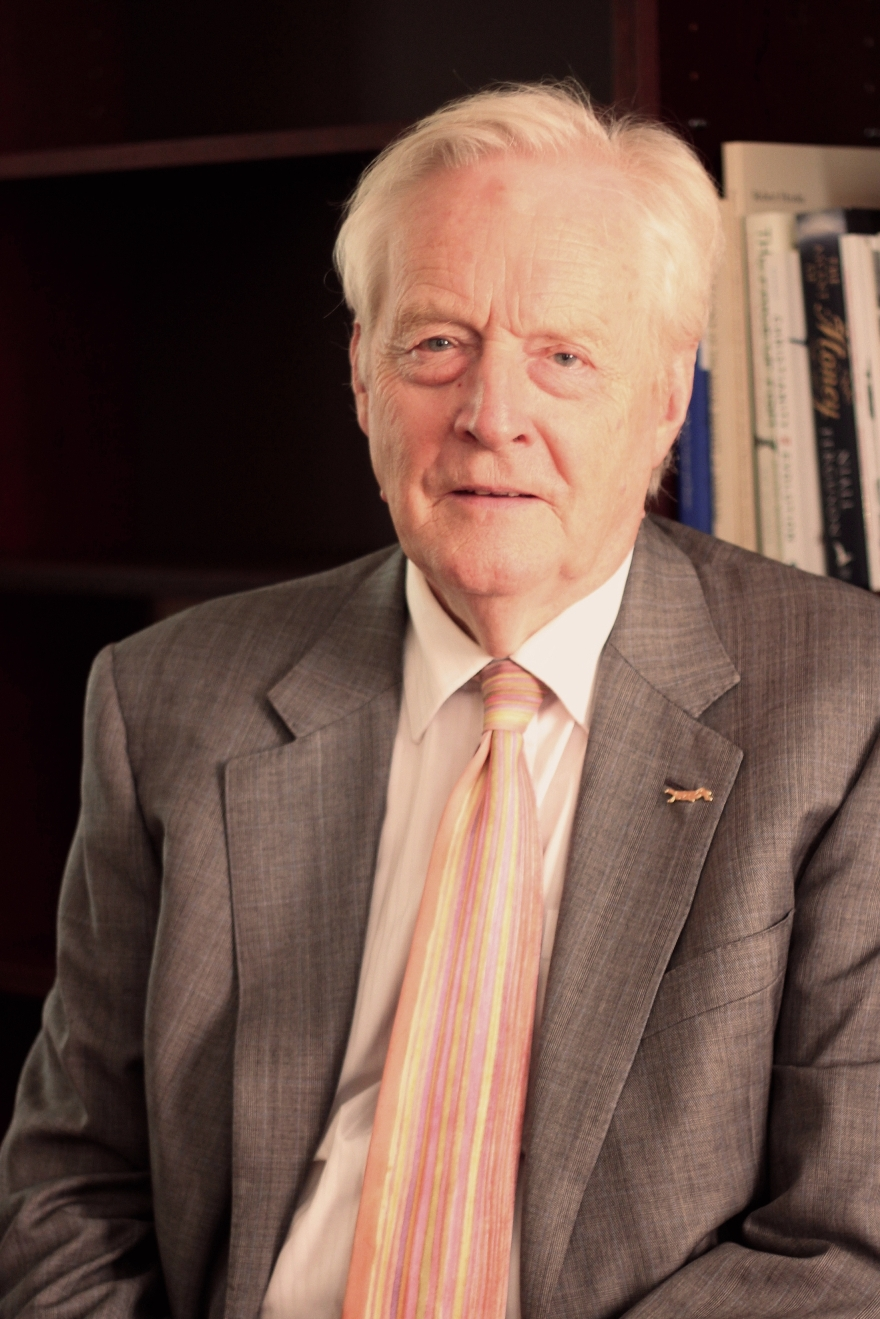
Sir Roderick Floud FBA

Sir Roderick Castle Floud FBA (born 1 April 1942) is a British economic historian and a leader in the field of anthropometric history. He has been provost of the London Guildhall University, vice-chancellor and president of the London Metropolitan University, acting dean of the School of Advanced Study at the University of London, and provost of Gresham College (2008–2014). He is the son of Bernard Floud MP, is married to Cynthia (née Smith) and has two daughters.

== Career ==
Educated at Brentwood School in Essex, Sir Roderick gained his B.A. and M.A. from the University of Oxford (where he was also treasurer of the Oxford Union), attending Wadham College. He gained his doctorate in 1966 from Nuffield College, Oxford.

Having been an assistant lecturer in economic history at University College London, he became a fellow, tutor and director of studies in history at Emmanuel College, Cambridge (1969–1975). Between 1975 and 1988 he was the Professor of Modern History at Birkbeck, University of London, with a year as the Kratter Visiting Professor of European History and visiting professor of economics at Stanford University (1980–1981).

In 1988 he was appointed provost of the City of London Polytechnic, which in 1992 was reconstituted as London Guildhall University. In 2002, when London Guildhall University merged with the University of North London to become London Metropolitan University, he became the first vice-chancellor of the new institution. He attracted controversy over the destruction of a history of London Guildhall University that he had commissioned. In 2004 he became president of London Metropolitan University, a position he held until March 2006. He was knighted in 2005.

He was the acting dean of the School of Advanced Study at the University of London from 1 August 2007 to 30 September 2009. On 1 September 2008, he succeeded Lord Sutherland of Houndwood as the sixth provost of Gresham College. In 2014 he retired from the college and was succeeded by Sir Richard J. Evans.

Sir Roderick Floud's interest in part-time and mature students in higher education has been reflected in his participation in numerous boards and committees. These notably include: president of Universities UK (2001–2003), Vice-President of the European University Association (2005–2007), and chair of the Standing Committee for the Social Sciences at the European Science Foundation (2007–2013).

== In economic history ==
As well as his professional academic career, Floud is a leading economic and social historian. He was one of the first people in Britain to apply statistics and computing to the study of economic history, and he was also a leader in the field of anthropometric history, the study of changes in human heights and weights. His D.Phil. thesis, later published as The British Machine Tool Industry, 1850–1914, made use of econometric analysis and he soon published An Introduction to Quantitative Methods for Historians and other books and articles on computing and statistics in history.

In the 1970s, in association with Professor Robert Fogel in the United States, he turned to anthropometric history, publishing a number of articles and then writing (with Kenneth W. Wachter and Annabel Gregory) Height, Health and History: nutritional status in the United Kingdom, 1750–1980 and later (with Robert Fogel, Bernard Harris and Sok Chul Hong) The Changing Body: health, nutrition and human development in the Western World since 1700.

He latterly took up an entirely new field, the economic and social history of British gardening. His book on this topic, An Economic History of the English Garden, was published by Allen Lane in November 2019.

Floud has edited four editions of what is now The Cambridge Economic History of Modern Britain, the leading university textbook on the topic. He has also published books and articles on higher education, part-time students, access to university courses and the regulation of universities.

== Other positions and fellowships ==
- Fellow of the Royal Historical Society
- Fellow of the Royal Society of Arts
- Fellow of the British Academy (elected 2002)
- Past Master of the Guild of Educators
- Fellow of the Academy of Social Sciences (elected 2001)
- Fellow of Academia Europaea
