= Jon Pynoos =

American gerontologist

Dr. Jon Pynoos is the UPS Foundation Professor at the USC Leonard Davis School of Gerontology. He is the author of six books and numerous articles on housing and the elderly. He received his AB degree at Harvard College in 1964, his MCP at Harvard University in 1971 and his PhD at Harvard in 1974. He has written extensively and advised government and non-profit sectors on how to improve housing and long-term care for the elderly. He is on the Public Policy Committee of the American Society of Aging and has been a delegate to three White House Conferences on Aging. He is a founding member of the National Home Modification Action Coalition.

== Books ==
- Jon Pynoos, Penny Hollander Feldman, et al, Linking Housing and Services for Older Adults: Obstacles, Options, and Opportunities
- Victor Regnier and Jon Pynoos, Housing the Aged: Design Directives and Policy Considerations
- Jon Pynoos and Phoebe S. Liebig, Housing Frail Elders: International Policies, Perspectives and Prospects
- Jon Pynoos, Rober Schafer, Chester W Hartman (eds), Housing Urban America (with others)
- Jon Pynoos, Breaking the Rules: Bureaucracy and Reform in Public Housing

== Honors ==
He was awarded both Guggenheim and Fulbright Fellowships.
