= Peter Laslett =

English historian

Peter Laslett CBE FBA
- Born: Thomas Peter Ruffell Laslett; 18 December 1915; Bedford, England
- Died: 8 November 2001 (aged 85); Cambridge, England
- Known for: Co-founding the Cambridge Group for the History of Population and Social Structure
- Spouse: Janet Crockett Clark (m. 1947)

Academic background
- Education: St John's College, Cambridge

Academic work
- Discipline: History; anthropology; political science
- Sub-discipline: Demographic history; intellectual history; political theory; social history
- School or tradition: Cambridge School
- Institutions: Trinity College, Cambridge
- Notable students: James Axtell; Keith Wrightson; Emmanuel Todd
- Notable works: The World We Have Lost (1965); A Fresh Map of Life (1989)
- Influenced: Alan Macfarlane; Quentin Skinner

Thomas Peter Ruffell Laslett CBE FBA (18 December 1915 – 8 November 2001) was an English historian.

== Biography ==
Laslett was the son of a Baptist minister and was born in Bedford on 18 December 1915. Although he spent much of his childhood in Oxford, he was educated at the Watford Grammar School for Boys. In 1938, he took a double first in history from St John's College, Cambridge. He stayed in Cambridge for some time, conducting historical research, then in 1940 joined the Fleet Air Arm. After a period working on protection of Arctic convoys, Laslett then learned Japanese at the School of Oriental and African Studies, joined the Royal Navy Volunteer Reserve as a lieutenant and worked on decoding Japanese naval intelligence. He was stationed first at Bletchley Park and later, after VE Day, in Washington, DC. It was at Bletchley Park that he met his future wife, Janet Crockett Clark, whom he married in 1947.

Laslett was demobilised in 1945 and returned to Cambridge, initially spending time at Peterhouse as a protege of Herbert Butterfield. In 1948, he was awarded a research fellowship at St John's College, based on his pre-war postgraduate research into Robert Filmer. His editing of Filmer's political writings resulted in the 1949 publication titled Patriarcha and Other Political Writings that, according to historian J. G. A. Pocock, was the work by which Laslett provided the initial inspiration for the "Cambridge School" of the history of political thought, the methods of which are now widely practised. Laslett combined such academic activity with a lifelong concern to engage a wider audience. He worked simultaneously as a BBC radio producer for the Third Programme. One product of this desire to reach a wider audience was his pathbreaking and highly popular book The World We Have Lost: England Before the Industrial Age (1965; US edition, 1966), issued in a second edition in 1971 and in a retitled third revised edition, The World We Have Lost: Further Explored (1983; US edition, 1984). Simon Mitton credits Laslett with having launched in 1948 the radio broadcasting career of the astronomer Fred Hoyle.

In 1953, having earlier discovered and begun research into a substantial proportion of the library of John Locke, privately held at a shooting lodge in the Scottish Highlands, Laslett earned an appointment as a university lecturer in history at Cambridge and was elected a fellow Trinity College; thereafter, his involvement with the BBC declined and in 1960 ended. He worked with the philanthropist Paul Mellon and various institutions to negotiate the purchase and transfer of the library to the more suitable and accessible environs of the Bodleian in Oxford. He continued work in the history of political theory, arguing (against the accepted account) that Locke's Two Treatises of Government had been written to justify the English Glorious Revolution of 1688–9, but instead that it was written to justify Whig activity during the Exclusion Crisis remarking that the "Two Treatises is an Exclusion Tract, not a Revolution Pamphlet." He published an edition of the treatises in 1960, subsequently reprinted many times, which is now recognised as the definitive account of these pillars of modern liberal democracy. From 1957 he founded and co-edited Philosophy, Politics and Society, a series of collections on political philosophy.

Laslett took up an entirely different line of historical research from the early 1960s. Trying to understand 17th-century listings of the inhabitants of Clayworth and Cogenhoe, Northamptonshire, he became persuaded of the need to pursue historical demography more systematically. In 1964, Laslett and Tony Wrigley co-founded the Cambridge Group for the History of Population and Social Structure. With funding from the Social Science Research Council, the Cambridge Group worked alongside amateur volunteers on local records, and established the journal Local Population Studies.

Laslett's practical reformism found an outlet from the 1960s in his efforts, together with Michael Young, to develop the Open University. In 1963 he ran a series of five programmes on Anglia Television, the "Dawn University", which attracted a great deal of attention although the funding had to wait two more years until Harold Wilson took up the idea.

Laslett was Reader in Politics and the History of Social Structure at Cambridge University (the title reflecting his own unusual mix of historical interests) from 1966 until retirement in 1983. At this point, his interests turned to the historical understanding and practical betterment of the elderly. Laslett played a pivotal role in founding the University of the Third Age in 1982.

He died on 8 November 2001, aged 85, and was buried in Wolvercote Cemetery in Oxford, and was survived by his wife, Janet, and two sons. His library of early printed books by and about Filmer, Locke, and political thought (including political economy) was sold by Quaritch in 2006.

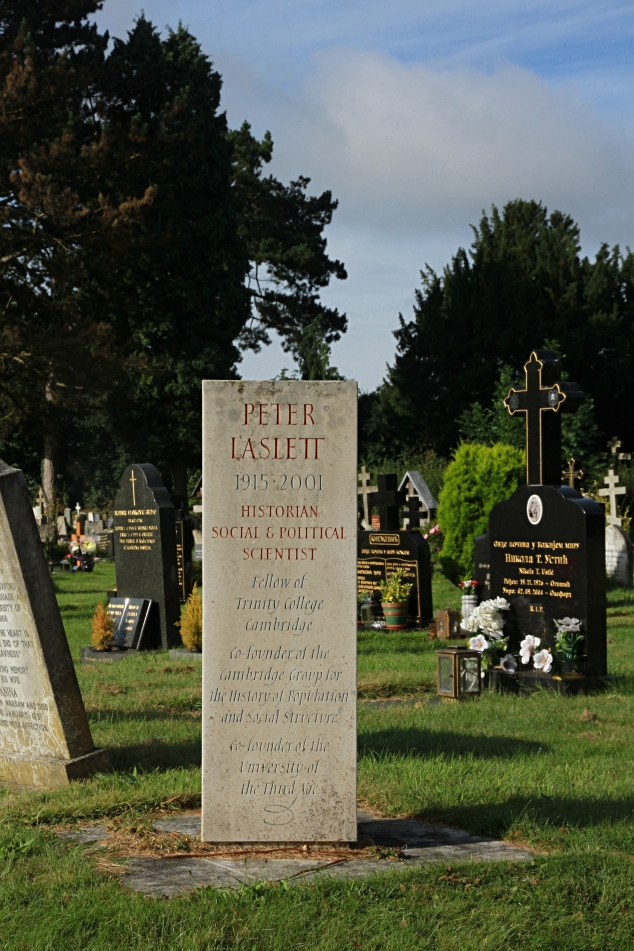
Laslett's headstone in Wolvercote Cemetery, Oxford

== Works ==
- The World We Have Lost: England Before the Industrial Age (London, 1965; New York, 1966; 2nd ed., 1971, 3rd ed., 1984; re-issued and updated 2000)
- An Introduction to English Historical Demography: From the Sixteenth to the Nineteenth Century (with David Edward Charles Eversley and Edward Anthony Wrigley, London and New York, 1966)
- Household and Family in Past Time (ed. with the assistance of Richard Wall, Cambridge, 1972)
- Family Life and Illicit Love in Earlier Generations: Essays in Historical Sociology (Cambridge, 1977)
- Statistical Studies of Historical Social Structure (with Kenneth W. Wachter and Eugene A. Hammel, London, 1978)
- Bastardy and its Comparative History: Studies in the History of Illegitimacy and Marital Nonconformism (co-edited with Karla Oosterveen and Richard M. Smith, Cambridge, 1980)
- The World We Have Lost: Further Explored (London, 1983; New York, 1984; 3rd ed., 2000, 4th ed., 2004)
- Family Forms in Historic Europe (edited by Richard Wall in collaboration with Jean Robin, Cambridge, 1983)
- A Fresh Map of Life: The Emergence of the Third Age (London, 1989; Cambridge, 1991; 2nd ed., 1996)
- Justice Between Age Groups and Generations (co-edited with James S. Fishkin, New Haven and London, 1992)
- Aging in the Past: Demography, Society, and Old Age (co-edited with David Kertzer, Berkeley, 1995)

Also The World We Have Gained: Histories of Population and Social Structure, Essays presented to Peter Laslett on his seventieth birthday (edited by Lloyd Bonfield, Keith Wrightson, Oxford, 1996)
