= Sean Curran (scientist) =

Sean Curran is an American gerontologist who is a Professor of Gerontology and Vice Dean, Dean of Faculty and Dean of Research for the USC Leonard Davis School of Gerontology. He holds a joint appointment in Molecular and Computational Biology in the USC Dana and David Dornsife College of Letters, Arts and Sciences. His expertise is the molecular genetics of healthspan and longevity with an emphasis on biology, genetics, nutrition, and diets.

== Education ==
Curran earned his B.S. in biochemistry from UCLA in 1999, his Ph.D. in biochemistry from UCLA in 2004 and completed postdoctoral training at Harvard Medical School and Massachusetts General Hospital from 2004-2010.

== Research ==
Curran and his co-author Gary Ruvkun discovered approximately 60 highly conserved genes that are essential for development but can significantly increase lifespan when inactivated in adulthood.

Curran’s research group has established the existence of gene-diet pairs that predict survival and aging success. The function of these genes is essential on some diets but dispensable on others. There are potentially hundreds, if not thousands of these gene-diet pairs, which when combined, may explain the variance in aging rates across individuals.

A 2022 study in eLife showed how age-related changes in strength and mobility may depend on genetic variations in a critical mitochondrial enzyme, ALDH4A1.

== Awards ==
- 2014 Nathan Shock Award – Gerontological Society of America
- 2015 Ewald Busse Award – Duke Center for the Study of Aging and Human Development
- 2020 Vincent Cristofalo Rising Star Award in Aging Research – American Federation for Aging Research (AFAR)
- 2025 Hiram J. Friedsam Mentorship Award – Academy for Gerontology in Higher Education, Gerontological Society of America

== Selected publications ==
- Villa, Osvaldo; Stuhr, Nicole L; Yen, Chia-an; Crimmins, Eileen M; Arpawong, Thalida Em; Curran, Sean P (2022-04-26). "Genetic variation in ALDH4A1 is associated with muscle health over the lifespan and across species". eLife. 11. doi:10.7554/eLife.74308. ISSN 2050-084X. PMC 9106327.
- Pang, S; Curran, SP (Feb 2014). "Adaptive capacity to bacterial diet modulates aging in C. elegans". Cell Metab. 19 (2): 221–31. doi:10.1016/j.cmet.2013.12.005. PMC 3979424. PMID 24440036.
- Curran, SP; Wu, X; Riedel, C; Ruvkun, G (Jun 2009). "A soma-to-germline transformation in long-lived Caenorhabditis elegans mutants". Nature. 459 (7250): 1079–84. Bibcode:2009Natur.459.1079C. doi:10.1038/nature08106. PMC 2716045. PMID 19506556.
- Curran, SP; Ruvkun, G (2007). "Lifespan regulation by evolutionarily conserved genes essential for viability". PLOS Genet. 3 (4): e56. doi:10.1371/journal.pgen.0030056.eor. PMC 1847696. PMID 17411345.
