= Pollyanna principle =

Tendency to remember pleasant things better

The Pollyanna principle (also called Pollyannaism or positivity bias) is the tendency for people to remember pleasant items more accurately than unpleasant ones. Research indicates that at the subconscious level, the mind tends to focus on the optimistic; while at the conscious level, it tends to focus on the negative. This subconscious bias is similar to the Barnum effect.

== Development ==
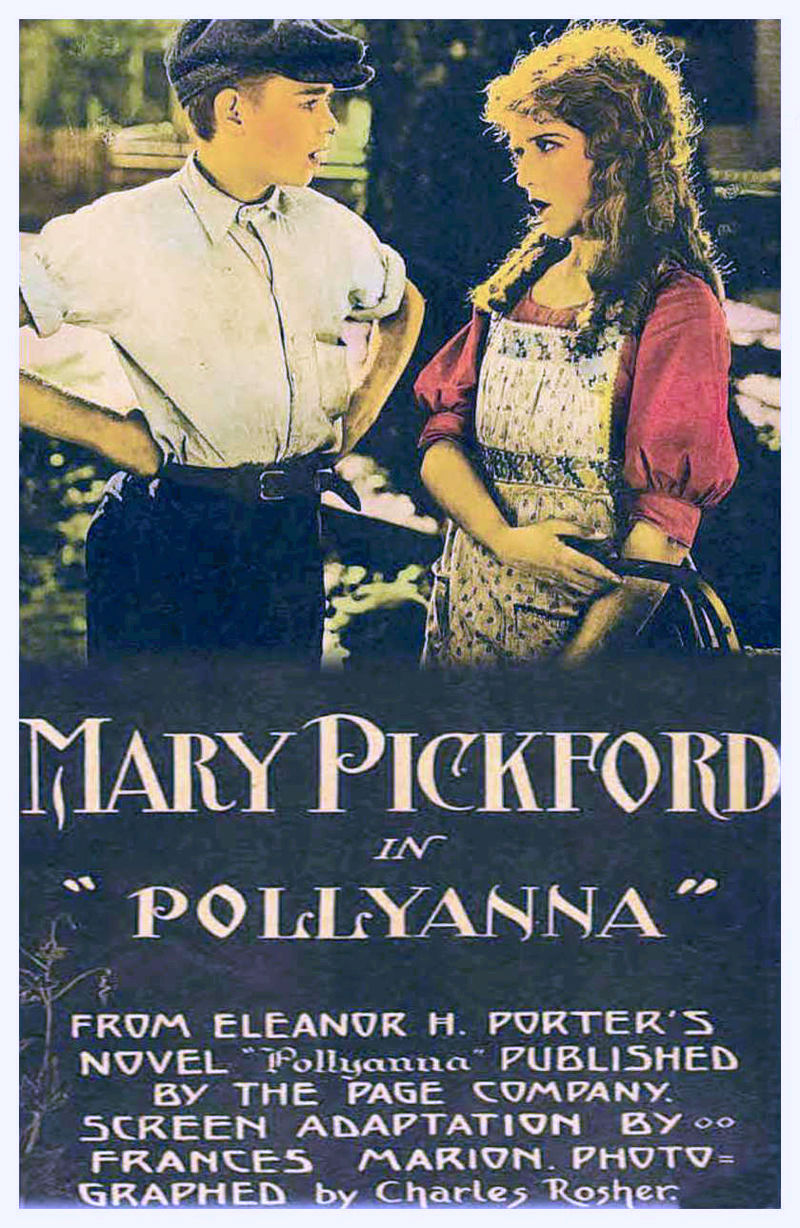
Poster for the 1920 film Pollyanna

The name derives from the 1913 novel Pollyanna by Eleanor H. Porter describing a girl who plays the "glad game"—trying to find something to be glad about in every situation. The novel has been adapted to film several times, most famously in 1920 and 1960. An early use of the name "Pollyanna" in psychological literature was in 1969 by Boucher and Osgood who described a Pollyanna hypothesis as a universal human tendency to use positive words more frequently and diversely than negative words in communicating. Empirical evidence for this tendency has been provided by computational analyses of large corpora of text.

== Psychological research and findings ==
The Pollyanna principle was described by Margaret Matlin and David Stang in 1978 using the archetype of Pollyanna more specifically as a psychological principle which portrays the positive bias people have when thinking of the past. According to the Pollyanna principle, the brain processes information that is pleasing and agreeable in a more precise and exact manner as compared to unpleasant information. People actually tend to remember past experiences as more rosy than they actually occurred. The researchers found that people expose themselves to positive stimuli and avoid negative stimuli, they take longer to recognize what is unpleasant or threatening than what is pleasant and safe, and they report that they encounter positive stimuli more frequently than they actually do. Matlin and Stang also determined that selective recall was a more likely occurrence when recall was delayed: the longer the delay, the more selective recall that occurred.

The Pollyanna principle has been observed on online social networks as well. For example, a series of studies by Emilio Ferrara, a computer scientist at the University of Southern California, found that Twitter users preferentially share more, and are emotionally affected more frequently by, positive information.

However, the only exception to the Pollyanna principle tends to be individuals suffering from depression or anxiety, who are more likely to either have more depressive realism or a negative bias.

== Positivity effect ==
The positivity effect is the ability to constructively analyze a situation where the desired results are not achieved, but still obtain positive feedback that assists one's future progression.

Empirical research findings suggest that the positivity effect can be influenced by internal positive speech, where engaging in constructive self-dialogue can significantly improve one's ability to perceive and react to challenging situations more optimistically.

The findings of a study show that the optimism bias in future-oriented thinking fulfills a self-improvement purpose while also suggesting this bias probably reflects a common underpinning motivational process across various future-thinking domains, either episodic or semantic.

=== In attribution ===
The positivity effect as an attribution phenomenon relates to the habits and characteristics of people when evaluating the causes of their behaviors. To positively attribute is to be open to attributing a person's inherent disposition as the cause of their positive behaviors, and the situations surrounding them as the potential cause of their negative behaviors.

=== In perception ===
Two studies by Emilio Ferrara have shown that, on online social networks like Twitter and Instagram, users prefer to share positive news, and are emotionally affected by positive news more than twice as much as they are by negative news.

== Positivity bias ==
Positivity bias is the part of the Pollyanna principle that attributes reasons to why people may choose positivity over negative or realistic mindsets. In positive psychology, it is broken down into three ideas: positive illusions, self deception, and optimism. Having a positive bias increases with age, as it is more prevalent in adults approaching older adulthood than younger children or adolescents. Older adults tend to pay attention to positive information, and this could be due to a specific focus in cognitive processing. In studies compiled by Andrew Reed and Laura Carstensen, they found that older adults (in comparison to younger adults) purposefully directed their attention away from negative material.

== Criticisms ==
Although the Pollyanna principle can be seen as helpful in some situations, some psychologists say it may inhibit an individual from coping effectively with life obstacles. The Pollyanna principle in some instances can be known as "Pollyanna syndrome" and is defined by such skeptics as a person who is excessively positive and blind towards the negative or real. With regard to therapy or counseling, it is viewed as dangerous to both the therapist and patient.

== See also ==
- Appeal to flattery
- Cloud cuckoo land
- Coping
- Cornucopianism
- Confirmation bias
- Depressive realism
- Illusory superiority
- List of biases in judgment and decision making
- List of memory biases
- Optimism bias
- Overconfidence effect
- Positivity effect
- Positivity offset
- Reality principle
- Rosy retrospection
- Scotomization
- Self-deception
- Self-serving bias
- Toxic positivity
- Wishful thinking

== Bibliography ==
- Bloch, Arthur (1977). Murphy's Law and other reasons why things go wrong. Price Stern Sloan. p. 41. ISBN 978-0-8431-0428-8.
- Boucher, J.; Osgood, C. (1969). "The Pollyanna hypothesis". Journal of Verbal and Learning Behavior. 8 (1): 1–8. doi:10.1016/S0022-5371(69)80002-2.
- Carr, Alan (2004). Positive Psychology: The Science of Happiness and Human Strengths. Psychology Press. p. 77. ISBN 978-1-58391-991-0.
- Dodds, Peter Sheridan; Clark, Eric M.; Desu, Suma; Frank, Morgan R.; Reagan, Andrew J.; Williams, Jake Ryland; Mitchell, Lewis; Harris, Kameron Decker; Kloumann, Isabel M. (2015). "Human language reveals a universal positivity bias". Proceedings of the National Academy of Sciences. 112 (8): 2389–2394. arXiv:1406.3855. Bibcode:2015PNAS..112.2389D. doi:10.1073/pnas.1411678112. ISSN 0027-8424. PMC 4345622. PMID 25675475.
- Ferrara, Emilio; Yang, Zeyao (2015a). "Quantifying the effect of sentiment on information diffusion in social media". PeerJ Computer Science. 1 e26. arXiv:1506.06072. Bibcode:2015arXiv150606072F. doi:10.7717/peerj-cs.26. S2CID 14133100.
- Ferrara, Emilio; Yang, Zeyao (2015b). "Measuring Emotional Contagion in Social Media". PLOS ONE. 10 (11) e0142390. arXiv:1506.06021. Bibcode:2015PLoSO..1042390F. doi:10.1371/journal.pone.0142390. PMC 4636231. PMID 26544688.
- Forer, Bertram R. (1949). "The fallacy of personal validation: A classroom demonstration of gullibility" (PDF). The Journal of Abnormal and Social Psychology. 44 (1): 118–123. doi:10.1037/h0059240. PMID 18110193.
- Furnham, Adrian; Schofield, Sandra (1987). "Accepting personality test feedback: A review of the Barnum effect". Current Psychology. 6 (2): 162–178. doi:10.1007/BF02686623. S2CID 145284019.
- Hildebrandt, H. W.; Snyder, R. D. (1981). "The Pollyanna Hypothesis in Business Writing: Initial Results, Suggestions for Research" (PDF). Journal of Business Communication. 18 (1): 5–15. doi:10.1177/002194368101800102. hdl:2027.42/68397. S2CID 145261157.
- Holtz, Peter; Deutschmann, Emanuel; Dobewall, Henrik (2017). "Cross-Cultural Psychology and the Rise of Academic Capitalism: Linguistic Changes in CCR and JCCP Articles, 1970–2014". Journal of Cross-Cultural Psychology. 48 (9): 1410–1431. doi:10.1177/0022022117724902. hdl:10138/224669. S2CID 55678685.
- Latecki, B. (2017). "Pollyanna syndrome in psychotherapy-or pseudotherapy. counseling, consoling or counterfeiting?". European Psychiatry. 41: S777–S778. doi:10.1016/j.eurpsy.2017.01.1474. S2CID 148849363.
- Matlin, M. W.; Stang, D. J. (1978). The Pollyanna Principle: Selectivity in Language, Memory, and Thought. Schenkman Publishing Company. ISBN 978-0-87073-815-9.
- Matlin, M. W.; Gawron, V. J. (1979). "Individual Differences in Pollyannaism". Journal of Personality Assessment. 43 (4): 411–412. doi:10.1207/s15327752jpa4304_14. PMID 16366974.
- Matlin, Margaret W. (2004). "Pollyanna Principle". In Rüdiger, F. Pohl (ed.). Cognitive Illusions: A Handbook on Fallacies and Biases in Thinking. Taylor & Francis. p. 260. ISBN 978-1-135-84495-0.
- Mezulis, A. H.; Abramson, L. Y.; Hyde, J. S.; Hankin, B. L. (2004). "Is there a universal positivity bias in attributions? A meta-analytic review of individual, developmental, and cultural differences in the self-serving attributional bias". Psychological Bulletin. 130 (5): 711–747. doi:10.1037/0033-2909.130.5.711. PMID 15367078.
- Paul, A. M. (2004). The Cult of Personality: How Personality Tests Are Leading Us to Miseducate Our Children, Mismanage Our Companies, and Misunderstand Ourselves. Free Press. ISBN 978-0-7432-4356-8.
- Pearrow, M. (2002). The Wireless Web Usability Handbook. Boston, MA: Charles River Media. ISBN 1-58450-056-5.
- Racy, Famira; Morin, Alain (January 2024). "Relationships between Self-Talk, Inner Speech, Mind Wandering, Mindfulness, Self-Concept Clarity, and Self-Regulation in University Students". Behavioral Sciences. 14 (1): 55. doi:10.3390/bs14010055. ISSN 2076-328X. PMC 10813701. PMID 38247707.
- Reed, A. E.; Carstensen, L. L. (2012). "The theory behind the age-related positivity effect". Frontiers in Psychology. 339.
- Salgado, Sinué; Berntsen, Dorthe (2019-04-29). "My future is brighter than yours: the positivity bias in episodic future thinking and future self-images" (PDF). Psychological Research. 84 (7): 1829–1845. doi:10.1007/s00426-019-01189-z. ISSN 0340-0727. PMID 31037451. S2CID 140294480.
- Taylor, S.E.; Koivumaki, J.H. (1976). "The perception of self and others: Acquaintanceship, affect and actor-observer differences". Journal of Personality and Social Psychology. 33 (4): 403–408. doi:10.1037/0022-3514.33.4.403. PMID 1271218.
- Winquist, Lynn A.; Mohr, Cynthia D.; Kenny, David A. (1998). "The Female Positivity Effect in the Perception of Others". Journal of Research in Personality. 32 (3): 370–388. doi:10.1006/jrpe.1998.2221.

=== Dictionaries and encyclopedias ===
- Hoorens, Vera (2014). "Positivity Bias". Encyclopedia of Quality of Life and Well-Being Research. Springer Netherlands. pp. 4938–4941. doi:10.1007/978-94-007-0753-5_2219. ISBN 978-94-007-0752-8.
- Colman, Andrew M (2008). "Positivity Bias". A Dictionary of Psychology (3rd ed.). Oxford University Press. ISBN 978-0-19-953406-7.
