= Kenneth W. Wachter =

- Born: January 13, 1947 (age 79); Brooklyn, New York, U.S.
- Citizenship: American
- Education: Harvard College (AB); St Catherine's College, Oxford (MA); Trinity College, Cambridge (PhD)
- Awards: National Academy of Sciences member (1999); American Academy of Arts and Sciences Fellow (1996); American Statistical Association Fellow (1986); Mindel C. Sheps Award (1986); Presidential Scholar (1964)
- Scientific career
- Fields: Demography, Mathematical statistics, Biodemography
- Workplaces: University of California, Berkeley; Harvard University; Bell Labs

Kenneth W. Wachter (born January 13, 1947) is an American mathematical demographer and statistician, known for contributions to demographic microsimulation (agent-based modeling), anthropometric history, statistical endocrinology, and evolutionary biodemography. He is Distinguished Professor Emeritus of Demography and Statistics at the University of California, Berkeley. Wachter was elected to the National Academy of Sciences in 1999.

== Early life and education ==
Wachter is the son of lawyer John H. Wachter and columnist Evelyn Ardelle Sidman. He attended The Pingry School in Elizabeth, New Jersey, and was named a Presidential Scholar by President Lyndon B. Johnson in 1964. He earned his Bachelor of Arts magna cum laude in History and Literature from Harvard College in 1968, where he was elected to Phi Beta Kappa in his junior year and awarded the Harvard Prize for History and Literature.

As a Keasbey Memorial Scholar, Wachter attended graduate school in the United Kingdom. In 1971, while working as a Research Fellow at St Catherine's College, Oxford, he was awarded a Master of Arts by special decree in Applied Mathematics from the University of Oxford. He completed his doctorate in statistics at Trinity College, University of Cambridge, in 1974. His doctoral dissertation was titled "Foundations of the Asymptotic Theory of Random Matrix Spectra".

== Career ==
Wachter worked at Bell Telephone Laboratories as an Associate Member of technical staff in the early years of his career (1968–1969). He was an Assistant Professor of Statistics at Harvard University from 1974 to 1977 and became a Miller Fellow in Statistics at the University of California, Berkeley in 1977.

In 1978, Wachter was a founding member of the newly reconstituted department of Demography at the University of California, Berkeley, where he taught throughout his career. Under the leadership of Eugene Hammel, Ronald D. Lee, and Wachter, the Berkeley Demography Department fostered mathematical and formal demography, macro-level economic and historical demography, interdisciplinary qualitative research, biodemography, and aging studies, training some of the leading demographers of the 21st Century. From 1997 to 2008, he chaired the Department of Demography. From 2009 to 2010, he was named Miller Professor at the Miller Institute for Basic Research in Science. He has been a Professor of the Graduate School and Distinguished Professor Emeritus since 2014.

== Leadership and public advisory roles ==
Wachter was an expert witness for the U.S. Department of Justice's Civil Division and a member of the Secretary of Commerce's Special Advisory Panel on Census Adjustment from 1989 to 1991. In addition to serving on the Editorial Board of the Proceedings of the National Academy of Sciences covering social sciences from 2000 to 2006 and starting in 2010, he chaired the Scientific Advisory Committee of the Max Planck Institute for Demographic Research in Rostock, Germany from 1999 to 2004 and the Committee on Population of the National Research Council from 2003 to 2008.

Additionally, he was a member of the National Academy of Sciences Committee on Publications (2015–2023), the Board of Directors of the Population Association of America (1999–2002), and the Board of Directors of the Social Science Research Council (1993–2000).

== Research ==
In 1971, with Peter Laslett and Eugene Hammel, Wachter developed the SOCSIM demographic microsimulation program, the first to track kinship through parents of both sexes with rates changing over time, a prototype for the agent-based models that have become common in social science. Beginning with Statistical Studies of Historical Social Structure (1978), SOCSIM has been applied to a host of problems in kinship forecasting, population structure, incest taboos, race and family, orphanhood, and bereavement. It is one of the few creations from the early days of scientific computing still in use after fifty years.

Height, Health, and History (1990) by Roderick Floud, Annabel Gregory, and Wachter opened up the use of stature to estimate changes in living standards, analyzing English military and charity measurements of heights from the 1700s onward. In the 1980s, Wachter partnered with Dr. George R. Merriam III to develop the PULSAR approach to peak detection in episodic hormone secretion series, which has continued in use among endocrinologists into the 2020s.

The volume Between Zeus and the Salmon (1997), edited by Wachter and Caleb Finch, consolidated the new field of the biodemography of aging. David Steinsaltz, Steve Evans, and Wachter went on to formulate mathematical models with rich demographic structure for the evolutionary process of mutation accumulation, helping elucidate commonalities across species in processes of senescence. Wachter's textbook Essential Demographic Methods (2014) brought conceptual depth to the teaching of formal demography.

== Awards and honors ==
Throughout his career, Wachter has received awards for his scientific and academic contributions. He was named a Presidential Scholar in 1964 and went on to be elected a Fellow of the American Statistical Association in 1986. In 1988, the Population Association of America honored him with the Mindel C. Sheps Award for Outstanding Contributions to Mathematical Demography. His research and leadership earned him fellowship in both the American Academy of Arts and Sciences and the American Association for the Advancement of Science in 1997, followed by election as a member of the U.S. National Academy of Sciences in 1999. Beyond his research achievements, UC Berkeley's Division of Social Sciences recognized him with the Distinguished Teaching Award in 2002 and the Distinguished Service Award in 2008, alongside the Alumni "Letter in Life" Award from The Pingry School in 2007.

== Personal life ==
He is married to Bernadette Bell since 1982 and lives in Berkeley and on The Sea Ranch, California.

== Selected publications ==
- Wachter, Kenneth W.; Hammel, Eugene A.; Laslett, Peter (1978). Statistical Studies of Historical Social Structure. Academic Press. ISBN 978-0-12-729150-5.
- Floud, Roderick; Wachter, Kenneth W.; Gregory, Annabel (1990). Height, Health, and History: Nutritional Status in the United Kingdom, 1750–1980. Cambridge University Press. ISBN 978-0-521-30314-9.
- Evans, Steven N.; Steinsaltz, David; Wachter, Kenneth W. (2013). A Mutation-Selection Model with Recombination for General Genotypes. Memoirs of the American Mathematical Society. ISBN 978-0-8218-7569-8.
- Wachter, Kenneth W. (2014). Essential Demographic Methods. Harvard University Press. ISBN 978-0-674-04557-6.
- Wachter, Kenneth W.; Finch, Caleb E., eds. (1997). Between Zeus and the Salmon: The Biodemography of Longevity. National Academy Press. ISBN 978-0-309-05787-5.
- Merriam, George R.; Wachter, Kenneth W. (1982). Algorithms for the Study of Episodic Hormone Secretion. American Journal of Physiology. 243 (4): E310–E318.
- Wachter, Kenneth W. (1984). Lotka's Roots under Rescalings. Proceedings of the National Academy of Sciences. 81 (11): 3600–3604.
- Wachter, Kenneth W. (1997). Kinship Resources for the Elderly. Philosophical Transactions of the Royal Society of London B. 352: 1811–1817.
- Barbi, E.; Lagona, F.; Marsili, M.; Vaupel, J. W.; Wachter, K. W. (2018). The Plateau of Mortality: Demography of Longevity Pioneers. Science. 360 (6396): 1459–1461.
- Goldstein, J. R.; Cassidy, T.; Wachter, K. W. (2021). Vaccinating the oldest-old against COVID-19 saves both the most lives and the most years of life. Proceedings of the National Academy of Sciences.118 (11): e2026322118.
