= Kathleen Wilber =

Gerontologist

- Born: 1948 (age 77–78)
- Education: BA (1970); MSW (1975); MPA (1975); PhD (1983)
- Alma mater: Manhattanville College, USC
- Scientific career
- Institutions: Davis School of Gerontology, University of Southern California

Kathleen H. "Kate" Wilber (born c. 1948) is a professor of gerontology at the University of Southern California. At the USC Leonard Davis School of Gerontology, she holds the title of Mary Pickford Foundation Professor of Gerontology. Her work focuses on improving the quality of life of people with chronic physical and mental health conditions by improving the formal health and long-term care delivery systems. The collaborative relationships among health care providers, cost effectiveness and health outcomes of different service delivery structures are more specific examples of her research and expertise. Another focus of her expertise is the prevention of elder mistreatment, including financial abuse.

== Career ==
At USC, Wilber directs the Secure Old Age Lab, which conducts research on healthcare systems and services, elder abuse prevention, and economic security for older adults. She is also the co-director of the USC Family Caregiver Support Center, which is the community service arm of the Leonard Davis School of Gerontology and houses the Los Angeles Caregiver Resource Center. Wilber is also a co-investigator of the USC Center for Advancing Caregiver Financial and Workplace Security.

Previously, Wilber led the California Task Force for Family Caregiving, an effort established by the California State Assembly provided recommendations for the state legislature to support Californians caring for individuals 18 and older.
