= The Longevity Diet =

2018 book

- First edition cover
- Author: Valter Longo
- Language: English
- Subject: Diet
- Publisher: Penguin Random House
- Publication date: January 1, 2018
- Publication place: United States
- Media type: Print (paperback)
- Pages: 317
- ISBN: 978-1405933940
- Dewey Decimal: 613
- LC Class: RA776.75
- Website: The Longevity Diet

The Longevity Diet is a 2018 book by Italian biogerontologist Valter Longo. The subject of the book is fasting and longevity. The book advocates a fasting mimicking diet (FMD) coupled with a mostly plant based diet that allows for the consumption of fish, for greater longevity.

== Background ==
Valter Longo, a PhD in biochemistry and director of the Longevity Institute at the University of Southern California, invented the fasting mimicking diet. Longo has said, "Using epidemiology and clinical trials, we put all the research together..." The diet calls for an emphasis on combining a plant-based diet with fish, together with fasting, timing and food quantity.

== Synopsis ==
In the book, Longo says one should alter one's diet to avoid illness in old age.

He advises dieters start the diet with a five-day fasting mimicking diet (FMD), which calls for a plant-based diet with calorie restriction of 1100 calories the first day, followed by 800 calories for the next few days. The fast-mimicking diet was pioneered by Valter Longo. The book calls for the five-day, calorie restriction FMD to occur twice per year. Before turning 65 the diet calls for minimal protein, and mostly plant-based diet augmented with calorie-restriction.

After someone finishes the fasting mimicking diet, Longo advocates following a mostly plant-based diet that includes fish. He also suggests implementing time-restricted eating, with daily eating windows of 11-12 hours.

== Reception ==
The book is an international bestseller, has been translated into more than 15 languages, and is sold in more than 20 countries.

Writing for Red Pen Reviews, Hilary Bethancourt stated the diet might be difficult and expensive to follow. Bethancourt goes on to say that the book gives advice about how to have a longer lifespan and healthspan through the practice of following a five-day fasting-mimicking diet and by choosing what to eat, how much to eat, and how often to eat.

Reviewing the book for Glam Adelaide James Murphy felt that the book has "too much discussion of his thwarted ambitions to be a rock star".
