= Mara Mather =

American psychologist

- Parent: John N. Mather

Academic background
- Education: AB (1994), PhD (2000)
- Alma mater: Princeton University; Stanford University

Academic work
- Discipline: Gerontology, neuroscience, psychology, biomedical engineering
- Institutions: Leonard Davis School of Gerontology
- Main interests: Neuroscience, emotion, cognition

Mara Mather is a professor of gerontology, psychology, and biomedical engineering at the USC Davis School of Gerontology. Her research deals with aging and affective neuroscience, focusing on how emotion and stress affect memory and decisions. She is the daughter of mathematician John N. Mather.

== Research areas ==
=== Age-related positivity effect ===
Her work with Laura Carstensen, Susan Charles and others revealed a positivity effect in older adults’ attention and memory, in which older adults favor positive information more and negative information less in their attention and memory than younger adults do. Perhaps the most intuitive explanation for this effect is that it is related to some sort of age-related decline in neural processes that detect and encode negative information. However, her research indicates that this is not the case.

Mather pointed out that the age-related positivity presents a paradox given the age-related shifts in autonomic activity. With age, parasympathetic activity decreases dramatically while sympathetic activity increases. This high sympathetic-to-parasympathetic profile is typically associated with depression and anxiety—which makes older adults' positivity effect even more surprising. She proposed that the age-related positivity effect may arise as a side effect of the brain's attempt to counteract noradrenergic hyperactivity in the periphery and the locus coeruleus.

=== Mechanisms underlying effects of emotional arousal on attention and memory ===
Although decades of studies indicated emotional arousal could powerfully affect attention and memory, Mather found that the existing literature did not allow researchers to predict when and for what type of information arousal would enhance vs. impair memory and published a series of theoretical papers tackling this question. In an initial paper, she outlined a framework positing that emotionally arousing objects attract attention that enhances memory for their within-object features. Mather then proposed an arousal-biased competition (ABC) model to account for a disparate array of emotional memory effects, including some effects that initially appear contradictory (e.g., emotion-induced retrograde amnesia vs. emotion-induced retrograde enhancement). The ABC model posits that arousal leads to both "winner-take-more" and "loser-take-less" effects in memory by biasing competition to enhance high priority information and suppress low priority information. Priority is determined by both bottom-up salience and top-down goal relevance. Previous theories fail to account for the broad array of selective emotional memory effects in the literature, and so the ABC model fills a key theoretical hole in the field of emotional memory. With colleagues, Mather then outlined a theory to account for how the locus coeruleus-noadrenaline system could simultaneously enhance brain processing of high priority or salient information while impairing processing of low priority/salience information.

=== Role of the locus coeruleus in cognitive aging ===
Until recently, the source of most of the brain's noradrenaline, the locus coeruleus, received little attention in the cognitive aging literature. However, postmortem findings indicating that pretangle tau pathology emerges in the locus coeruleus in most adults by age 40 and spreads along axons ascending from the locus coeruleus before tau tangles emerge in the cortex have focused interest on this research. These findings suggest that the locus coeruleus is a part of the Alzheimer’s pathological progression that is affected decades before any diagnosis. Part of the reason that the locus coeruleus had been ignored was that typical MRI techniques did not distinguish its structure from the surrounding brainstem. However, specific sequences show high MRI contrast in the locus coeruleus due to its different magnetic properties from the tissue around it, and Mather's lab group was the first to use these imaging techniques to demonstrate that higher structural MRI contrast in the locus coeruleus is associated with better cognition among older adults. They subsequently found that locus coeruleus MRI contrast was particularly associated with episodic memory in older adults and is associated with cortical tau burden and memory loss in autosomal-dominant Alzheimer’s disease. They also found that, when the sample size is sufficient, structural volume estimates using the typical structural images collected in neuroimaging studies predict conversion from normal cognition to Alzheimer’s disease.

=== Heart rate oscillatory activity and brain function ===
People with higher heart rate variability (HRV) are typically less anxious and less depressed. Previous theoretical perspectives have viewed HRV as an indicator measure of the integrity of brain emotion regulation circuits. Mather argued that heart rate oscillatory activity is more than just an indicator of brain health, and in fact has positive effects in the brain and tested this hypothesis in the HRV-ER randomized clinical trial. They found that 5 weeks of daily sessions increasing heart rate oscillations by breathing slowly at around 0.1 Hz (known as resonance frequency breathing, due to resonance with the ~0.1 Hz frequency of the baroreflex or blood pressure feedback loop) increased functional connectivity within emotion-related resting-state networks. These findings may help explain the emotional benefits of regular resonance frequency breathing. The HRV-ER clinical trial also revealed that the slow breathing condition decreased plasma Aβ levels.

== Honors ==
- National Institute on Aging K02 Career Development Award
- Distinguished Scientific Award for Early Career Contribution to Psychology from the American Psychological Association
- Richard Kalish Innovative Publication Award from the Gerontological Society of America
- Excellence in Teaching Award from the UC Santa Cruz Committee on Teaching
- USC Mentoring Award for Faculty Mentoring Faculty and Postdoctoral Scholars
- Springer Early Career Achievement Award in Research on Adult Development and Aging
- Margret Baltes Dissertation Award in the Psychology of Aging from APA Division 20
- American Psychological Association Dissertation Research Award
- National Science Foundation Graduate Fellowship
- AAPB Distinguished Scientist Award
- Alexander von Humboldt Foundation Research Fellowship
- Max Planck Sabbatical Award.
