= James Birren =

American gerontologist

James E. Birren (April 4, 1918 – January 15, 2016) was one of the founders of the organized field of gerontology. He was a past president of The Gerontological Society of America, and author of over 250 publications.

== Personal life ==
Birren was born on April 4, 1918, in Chicago. With the original intent to study engineering, Birren enrolled in Wright Junior College to study technical subjects. Birren changed his mind due to the Great Depression in America and decided to transfer to Chicago Teachers College to pursue what he thought to be a more practical career. It was there he took his first course in psychology, and he was encouraged by his professors to attend graduate school at Northwestern University.

Birren was strongly influenced by his time as a graduate student studying experimental psychology at Northwestern University. Birren married his wife, Betty, in 1942.

Birren died on January 15, 2016, at the age of 97.

== Theories ==
Birren was known for defining aging as three distinct processes: primary, secondary, and tertiary. Birren was the founding dean of the University of Southern California Leonard Davis School of Gerontology and founding director of the Ethel Percy Andrus Gerontology Center, and after his retirement from USC was associated for many years with the UCLA Center on Aging. A leading gerontological theorist in the area of neurocognition and psychology, Birren established much of the framework of modern gerontological theory, such as "quality of life" as a multidimensional concept involving biological, psychological, and sociocultural domains.

== Career ==
Birren was considered "one of the reigning pioneers of gerontology," by the American Society on Aging. He was instrumental in the growth and expansion of the field of gerontology in the 1950s, and his career spanned six decades.

Birren received his PhD from Northwestern University and began his research career at the Naval Medical Research Center. In 1947, he joined the U.S. Public Health Service in Baltimore and did research on aging at the Gerontology unit. Birren attended the very first meeting of GSA, The Gerontological Society of America in 1948. In 1950, he joined the National Institute of Mental Health and created the first section on aging. In 1964, he became the director for the Program on Aging for the National Institute on Child Health and Human Development. Jim moved to the University of Southern California in 1965 where he remained until 1989. There he was the founding director of the Ethel Percy Andrus Gerontology Center. In 1989, Birren moved to UCLA, where he remained as the associate director of the UCLA Center on Aging until he retired in 2003.

Birren's early research had an experimental base and he studied cognitive change and aging. Since developing the course Guided Autobiography more than thirty years ago, he has devoted much of his time and energy in the area of autobiographical studies.

Birren was also known for serving as a mentor and founding schools in gerontology to promote research on aging. In 1965, Birren moved to California to pursue a new career with The University of Southern California. There, he became the founding dean of the USC Davis School of gerontology. In this position, Birren flourished as a teacher and a mentor, offering degrees in gerontology at the undergraduate, masters, and PhD levels. Throughout his career, he produced over 200 PhDs in gerontology, and many of his students dedicated their careers to publishing literature in the field of gerontology. He also continued publishing literature in the field of gerontology. While the Davis School of Gerontology flourished and gained international recognition, Birren produced multiple editions of the Handbooks of Aging series, including The Handbook of Mental Health and Aging, The Handbook of Psychology and Aging, and The Handbook of Theories of Aging. These compilations include relevant research on the issues of aging and contributed to the development of gerontology as a science. One of Birren’s lasting contributions to the field is these compilations of research on aging.

When Birren became emeritus of the University of Southern California (USC) at the age of 71 in 1989, he went on to establish another institution of gerontology. Birren developed the Birren Center for Gerontological Research at the University of California, Los Angeles (UCLA). He eventually became the associate director of the Center for Aging at UCLA and continued publishing until he retired in 2003.

After retiring from UCLA he focused on his Guided Autobiography (GAB) program and in 2003 he founded the Birren Center for Autobiographical Studies with Cheryl Svensson, Ph.D., and a small group of close associates. Dr. Svensson is the director of the Center which has trained 678 Guided Autobiography instructors in 32 countries. It is now a non-profit organization. GAB is a 6 to 8-week program in which participants write 2 pages each week on 10 different subjects like Family, Money, Death, and Sex. It is about subjects in the writer’s life, not a chronological presentation. Birren described GAB as "therapeutic" but not "therapy".

== Books ==
- Telling the Stories of Life Through Guided Autobiography Groups (2001), J.E. Birren & K. Cochran. The Johns Hopkins University Press.
- Guiding Autobiography Groups for Older Adults (1991), J.E. Birren and D. Deutchman. The Johns Hopkins University Press.
- Where to Go From Here (1997), J.E. Birren & L. Feldman. Simon and Schuster.
