= Annie McGuire =

- Created by: Elliot Shoenman; Paul Wolff
- Starring: Mary Tyler Moore; Denis Arndt; John Randolph; Adrien Brody
- Composer: J.A.C. Redford
- Country of origin: United States
- Original language: English
- No. of seasons: 1
- No. of episodes: 11 (3 unaired)

Production
- Camera setup: Single-camera
- Running time: 30 minutes
- Production company: MTM Enterprises

Original release
- Network: CBS
- Release: October 26 – December 28, 1988

Annie McGuire is an American sitcom starring Mary Tyler Moore that aired on CBS from October 26 to December 28, 1988.

Though short-lived, Annie McGuire earned positive reviews from both the Los Angeles Times and The New York Times. The series was notable for its early use of a single-camera format and lack of a laugh-track, adopting a more realistic style than the traditional multi-camera sitcom at the time. Aspects of this stylistic approach would later gain widespread popularity in hybrid comedies like Seinfeld, The Larry Sanders Show and many others.

The series was created by veteran writer-producers Elliot Shoenman (known for The Cosby Show) and Paul Wolff (known for Remington Steele, Little House on the Prairie, Family Ties) as a star vehicle for Mary Tyler Moore. It also featured prominent comedian David Steinberg as a director, who would subsequently go on to direct episodes of Seinfeld, It's Garry Shandling's Show, and Curb Your Enthusiasm.

== Premise ==
Newlyweds Annie and Nick McGuire both have kids from previous marriages and are trying to balance their jobs (she in politics, he in engineering). The couple must also deal with their parents who are on opposite political sides.

== Cast ==
- Mary Tyler Moore as Annie McGuire
- Denis Arndt as Nick McGuire
- Eileen Heckart as Emma Block
- John Randolph as Red McGuire
- Adrien Brody as Lenny McGuire
- Cynthia Marie King as Debbie McGuire
- Bradley Warden as Lewis Block

== Episodes ==
No.	Title	Directed by	Written by	Original release date	U.S. viewers (millions)
1	"The Hold-Up"	David Steinberg	Paul Wolff & Elliot Shoenman	October 26, 1988	13.1
Annie befriends a Vietnam War veteran.
2	"Emma's Eviction"	David Steinberg	Lisa Albert	November 2, 1988	10.5
Annie's mother is evicted from her apartment by a developer.
3	"Annie and the Brooklyn Bridge"	David Steinberg	Paul Wolff & Elliot Shoenman	November 9, 1988	10.5
A construction project starts on the Brooklyn Bridge making it difficult for her to get to work.
4	"The Fried Shoe"	Arlene Sanford	Unknown	November 16, 1988	12.3
After three years in Indonesia, Annie's father returns.
5	"The Legend of the Bad Fish"	David Steinberg	Stuart Silverman	November 30, 1988	8.1
Annie researches a legend about Red and the Republican Party.
6	"The Ferry"	David Steinberg	Anne Convy, Stuart Silverman, Lisa Albert	December 7, 1988	5.6
Annie has to deal with the helpless wife of a businessman.
7	"Lewis in Love"	Helaine Head	Courtney Flavin	December 14, 1988	12.0
Lewis falls in love.
8	"The Journey"	Tom Cherones	Jule Selbo	December 28, 1988	9.3
A former neighbor of Annie has a heart attack and he wants to clear up some unfinished business.
9	"The Computer"	David Steinberg	N/A	Unaired	N/A
10	"The Honeymoon"	N/A	Josh Goldstein and Jonathan Prince	Unaired	N/A
11	"Soft-Hearted Annie"	David Steinberg	Anne Convy	Unaired	N/A
