= USC Davis School of Gerontology =

Academic division of the University of Southern California

Coordinates: 34.019995°N 118.290723°W

USC Leonard Davis School of Gerontology
- Type: Private
- Established: 1975
- Parent institution: University of Southern California
- Dean: Pinchas Cohen, MD
- Faculty: 53
- Undergraduates: 58
- Postgraduates: 160
- Doctoral students: 25
- Location: Los Angeles, California, United States
- Website: gero.usc.edu

The USC Leonard Davis School of Gerontology is one of the seventeen academic divisions of the University of Southern California in Los Angeles, focusing on undergraduate and graduate programs in gerontology.

== History ==
Founded in 1975, the Leonard Davis School is the oldest and largest professional School of Gerontology. The school offered the world’s first Ph.D. in Gerontology, the first joint master’s degree in Gerontology and Business Administration, and the first undergraduate Health Science Track in Gerontology. The Leonard Davis School also offered the first internet-based educational program to be approved by the Western Association of Schools and Colleges.

Its research and services component is the USC Ethel Percy Andrus Gerontology Center. Research in molecular biology, neuroscience, demography, psychology, sociology and public policy is conducted at the Andrus Gerontology Center, founded in 1964.

== Academics ==
The school offers two undergraduate degrees. The Bachelor of Science in Human Development and Aging has a health science track designed for students who wish to pursue medicine or other health-related fields and a social science track that focuses on human development via the behavioral sciences, designed for students pursuing law, policy, psychology, sociology, and health administration. The Bachelor of Science in Lifespan Health is for students pursuing medicine and health-related fields, and its material focuses on disease prevention, detection, and treatment.

Its graduate programs include twelve master's degrees and two PhD programs, as well as a graduate certificate program and a doctorate in longevity arts and sciences. The Master of Science in Gerontology is targeted towards students aiming for professional leadership positions, while the Master of Arts in Gerontology is formal training in gerontology for current professionals. The Master of Long-Term Care Administration focuses on long-term care.

The Master of Aging Services Management provides leadership training on management related specifically to aging services businesses such as residential, assisted living, retirement, home, or hospice care, while also including information on demography, health and culture. The Master of Science in Nutrition, Healthspan, and Longevity is about nutrition and dietetics, as applicable to health, and aging care facilities, food service programs, personal wellness, private practice, scientific research on health and longevity, or in policy and advocacy. Graduates may take the Commission of Dietetics Registration's national registration examination once graduated. Upon passing, graduates may receive the Registered Dietitian Nutritionist (RDN) credential.

Students working towards a PhD in Gerontology study the field of aging, especially research toward improving the quality of life throughout the entire lifespan.

Students working towards a PhD in Geroscience study molecular, cellular, and regenerative medicine as well as the integrative biology of aging. Students take core courses on the molecular and cellular biology of aging and age-related diseases, and then select a track among neuroscience, molecular, and cellular biology, stem cell and regenerative sciences, and biomedical sciences.

== Ethel Percy Andrus Gerontology Center ==
The Ethel Percy Andrus Gerontology Center is the research and services component of the USC Leonard Davis School. Established in 1964, it is the nation's first multidisciplinary research center devoted to aging. Its primary goal is to provide scientific information about the process of human development as it applies to individuals, families, organizations, and societies. Students at all levels are encouraged to take part in a variety of programs involving service, research, and other scholarly pursuits at the USC Andrus Center.

Following are examples of research programs and services at the Ethel Percy Andrus Gerontology Center:

The USC Longevity Institute unites multidisciplinary aging research approaches in order to maximize the healthy life span.

The USC/UCLA Center on Biodemography & Population Health (CBPH) is a multi-site center specializing in the demography of aging sponsored by the National Institute on Aging.

The Fall Prevention Center of Excellence (FPCE) seeks to better understand and identify causes of falls among older persons and develop effective interventions at individual, program, and system-wide levels.

The Los Angeles Caregiver Resource Center (LACRC), part of a statewide system of regional resource centers for caregivers, serves Los Angeles County residents who provide physical care or perform other caregiving tasks for an adult relative or friend. It is a program housed within the USC Family Caregiver Support Center.

== Notable current and former faculty ==
- Jennifer Ailshire
- James Birren
- Pinchas Cohen
- Eileen Crimmins
- Sean Curran
- Kelvin Davies
- Caleb Finch
- Valter Longo
- Mara Mather
- Christian Pike
- Jon Pynoos
- Edward L. Schneider
- John Walsh
- Kathleen Wilber
- Elizabeth Zelinski
