= Haroon Ahmed =

British-Pakistani scientist (1936–2024)

- Born: 2 March 1936; Calcutta, British India
- Died: 23 October 2024 (aged 88); Cambridge, England
- Education: Imperial College London (BSc); University of Cambridge (PhD)
- Known for: Microelectronics Technology; Cambridge Computing: The First 75 years
- Awards: ScD; FREng
- Scientific career
- Fields: Electrical Engineering; Microelectronics
- Workplaces: University of Cambridge; King's College, Cambridge; Cavendish Laboratory; Corpus Christi College, Cambridge; Computer Lab, Cambridge
- Thesis: Studies on high-current-density thermionic cathodes (1963)
- Doctoral advisor: Charles Oatley
- Website: www.cl.cam.ac.uk/research/dtg/www/people/ha10

Haroon Ahmed (2 March 1936 – 23 October 2024) was a British-Pakistani scientist who specialised in the fields of microelectronics and electrical engineering. He was Emeritus Professor of Microelectronics at the Cavendish Laboratory, the Physics Department of the University of Cambridge, Honorary Fellow of Corpus Christi College, Cambridge, and Fellow of the Royal Academy of Engineering.

== Early life and education ==
Ahmed was born on 2 March 1936 in Calcutta (then part of British India). His family later emigrated to England in 1954 and settled in London. He was educated at St Patrick's High School, Karachi, followed by an undergraduate degree at Imperial College London. He went on to obtain his PhD in 1963 and his Doctor of Science degrees in 1996 from the University of Cambridge.

== Career ==
Ahmed was appointed a faculty member of the Engineering Department, Cambridge in 1963 and worked there for 20 years before moving to the Physics Department where he was promoted to Professor of Microelectronics and was the Head of the Microelectronics Research Centre until his retirement in 2003. He was a former Master of Corpus Christi College, Cambridge, and an Honorary Fellow. He was Fellow of the Institute of Physics, and Fellow of the Institution of Electrical Engineers.

== Research ==
Ahmed published a large number of papers in scientific and engineering research journals on microelectronics, micro and nanofabrication, electron and ion beam lithography, semiconductor single electron devices and related topics.

He established a number of major collaborations between industry and the University including the Hitachi Cambridge Laboratory in the Microelectronics Research Centre. He is the author with P.J. Spreadbury of Electronics for Engineers (CUP 1973) and An Introduction to Physical Electronics with A.H.W. Beck (Elsevier, 1968, out of print). He was elected a Fellow of the Royal Academy of Engineering in 1990.

He served as a Syndic of Cambridge University Press, as Non-Executive Director of the Addenbrooke's Hospital NHS Trust, as President of the Philosophical Society, as a member of the MacRobert Committee which awards a prize annually to the most innovative engineering company in the UK and was a member of the Development Board of Imperial College. He also worked as a consultant to several major electronics industrial companies. He was elected a Fellow of Corpus Christi College in 1967, became Warden of Leckhampton House (the College's Graduate Campus) in 1993 and Master in 2000, succeeding Professor Sir Tony Wrigley and resigned in 2006 to advise the Government of Pakistan on Higher Education matters.

He was the College's 48th Master since its foundation in 1352. In his time as Master the College celebrated its 650th anniversary, the Taylor Library project was implemented, the Conservation Centre for manuscripts was built and the project on the digital imaging of the College's Parker collection was started.

== Personal life and death ==
Among his other interests were golf and cricket.

Ahmed died in Cambridge on 23 October 2024, at the age of 88.

Academic offices
Preceded by E.A. Wrigley	Master of Corpus Christi College, Cambridge; 2000-2006	Succeeded by Alan Wilson
