= John Walsh (American scientist) =

American academic

John P. Walsh is an American academic who is an associate professor at the USC Davis School of Gerontology as well as a member of USC's Neuroscience Program. His main research interest is the physiology of basal ganglia-related brain disease.

== Career ==
Walsh's research career focuses on understanding how synapses in the basal ganglia, and in particular, corticostriatal synapses are modified by use or experience and how these use-dependent changes in synapses strength translate into behavior. A particular focus has been the role played by dopamine in guiding "plasticity" at corticostriatal synapses and how pathology in dopamine function in disease impacts the ability of the basal ganglia to process information.

Walsh is also a dedicated surfer and was interviewed on the brain chemistry and biological advantages of UFC fighter Randy Couture on the ESPN2 special The Body Issue in 2010. He has spoke to the health news outlet Being Patient on how exercise improves body and brain heath for Parkinson's disease patients and to CNBC on what people should know about working into one's 80s.

Along with his traditional lecture courses, Walsh also leads an annual "Maymester" course at USC, bringing students to two "Blue Zones": Nicoya, Costa Rica and Loma Linda, California. He has spoken to popular press, including Los Angeles Times and SFGate, about the factors affecting lifespan, health and well-being in Blue Zones in general and in Loma Linda in particular.

== Honors and awards ==
Walsh received the USC Provost Prize for Teaching with Technology in 2008 as well as earning a $149,891 grant by the National Science Foundation to create an online learning tool. and Walsh won a $199,076 grant by the National Science Foundation for their Transforming Undergraduate Education in Science (TUES) Program to supervise the development of the online multimedia teaching-tool

== Selected Publications ==
- Petzinger GM, Fisher BE, McEwen S, Beeler JA, Walsh JP, Jakowec MW (2013). "Exercise-enhanced neuroplasticity targeting motor and cognitive circuitry in Parkinson's disease". The Lancet. Neurology. 12 (7): 716–726. doi:10.1016/S1474-4422(13)70123-6. PMC 3690528. PMID 23769598.
- Sancheti H, Akopian G, Yin F, Brinton RD, Walsh JP, Cadenas E (2013). "Age-dependent modulation of synaptic plasticity and insulin mimetic effect of lipoic acid on a mouse model of Alzheimer's disease". PLOS ONE. 8 (7) e69830. Bibcode:2013PLoSO...869830S. doi:10.1371/journal.pone.0069830. PMC 3714252. PMID 23875003.
- Kintz N, Petzinger GM, Akopian G, Ptasnik S, Williams C, Jakowec MW, Walsh JP (2013). "Exercise modifies α-amino-3-hydroxy-5-methyl-4-isoxazolepropionic acid receptor expression in striatopallidal neurons in the 1-methyl-4-phenyl-1,2,3,6-tetrahydropyridine-lesioned mouse". Journal of Neuroscience Research. 91 (11): 1492–1907. doi:10.1002/jnr.23260. PMID 23918451. S2CID 8668908.
- Davis DA, Akopian G, Walsh JP, Sioutas C, Morgan TE, Finch CE (2013). "Urban air pollutants reduce synaptic function of CA1 neurons via an NMDA/NȮ pathway in vitro". Journal of Neurochemistry. 127 (4): 509–519. doi:10.1111/jnc.12395. PMC 3818296. PMID 23927064.
- Toy WA, Petzinger GM, Leyshon BJ, Akopian GK, Walsh JP, Hoffman MV, Vučković MG, Jakowec MW (2014). "Treadmill exercise reverses dendritic spine loss in direct and indirect striatal medium spiny neurons in the 1-methyl-4-phenyl-1,2,3,6-tetrahydropyridine (MPTP) mouse model of Parkinson's disease". Neurobiology of Disease. 63: 201–209. doi:10.1016/j.nbd.2013.11.017. PMC 3940446. PMID 24316165.
- Liu Z, Patil IY, Jiang T, Sancheti H, Walsh JP, Stiles BL, Yin F, Cadenas E (2015). "High-fat diet induces hepatic insulin resistance and impairment of synaptic plasticity". PLOS ONE. 10 (5) e0128274. Bibcode:2015PLoSO..1028274L. doi:10.1371/journal.pone.0128274. PMC 4449222. PMID 26023930.
