= Charles Oatley =

British physicist and electrical engineer

Professor Sir Charles Oatley OBE FRS FREng
- Charles William Oatley (1904-1996)
- Born: 14 February 1904; Frome, Somerset, England
- Died: 11 March 1996 (aged 92)
- Education: St. John's College, Cambridge
- Known for: Scanning electron microscope
- Awards: Duddell Medal (1969); Royal Medal (1969); Faraday Medal (1970); Mullard Award (1973); Potts Medal (1989)
- Scientific career
- Fields: Physics; Electrical engineering
- Workplaces: Radio Accessories; English Electric Valve Company; King's College London; ADRDE; University of Cambridge
- Academic advisors: Edward Victor Appleton
- Doctoral students: Haroon Ahmed; Alec Broers; Thomas Everhart; Colin J. R. Sheppard

Sir Charles William Oatley (14 February 1904 – 11 March 1996) was Professor of Electrical Engineering, University of Cambridge, 1960–1971, and developer of one of the first commercial scanning electron microscopes. He was also a founder member of the Royal Academy of Engineering.

== Biography ==
He was born in Frome on Valentine's Day, 14 February 1904. A plaque has been placed on the house at the junction of Badcox Parade and Catherine Hill.

He was educated at Bedford Modern School and St. John's College, Cambridge. He lectured at King's College London for 12 years, until the war. He was a director of the English Electric Valve Company from 1966 to 1985. In 1969, he was elected to the Royal Society.

Oatley also received an Honorary Doctorate from Heriot-Watt University in 1974. In that same year, he was knighted.

He received an Honorary Degree (Doctor of Science) from the University of Bath in 1977. He retired from the English Electric Valve Company in 1985.

He was awarded the Howard N. Potts Medal in 1989. He died on 11 March 1996.

== Graduate students ==
Oatley and the graduate students he supervised made substantial contributions, particularly to the development of the scanning electron microscope (SEM).

"A project for a PhD student must provide him with good training and, if he is doing experimental work, there is much to be said for choosing a problem which involves the construction or modification of some fairly complicated apparatus. I have always felt that university research in engineering should be adventurous and should not mind tackling speculative projects."

His students included:

- Thomas Everhart, former President of Caltech
- Alec Broers, former Vice-Chancellor of the University of Cambridge and former president of the Royal Academy of Engineering.
- Haroon Ahmed, former Master of Corpus Christi College, Cambridge and Professor of Microelectronics
