= Tony Wrigley =

British historical demographer (1931–2022)

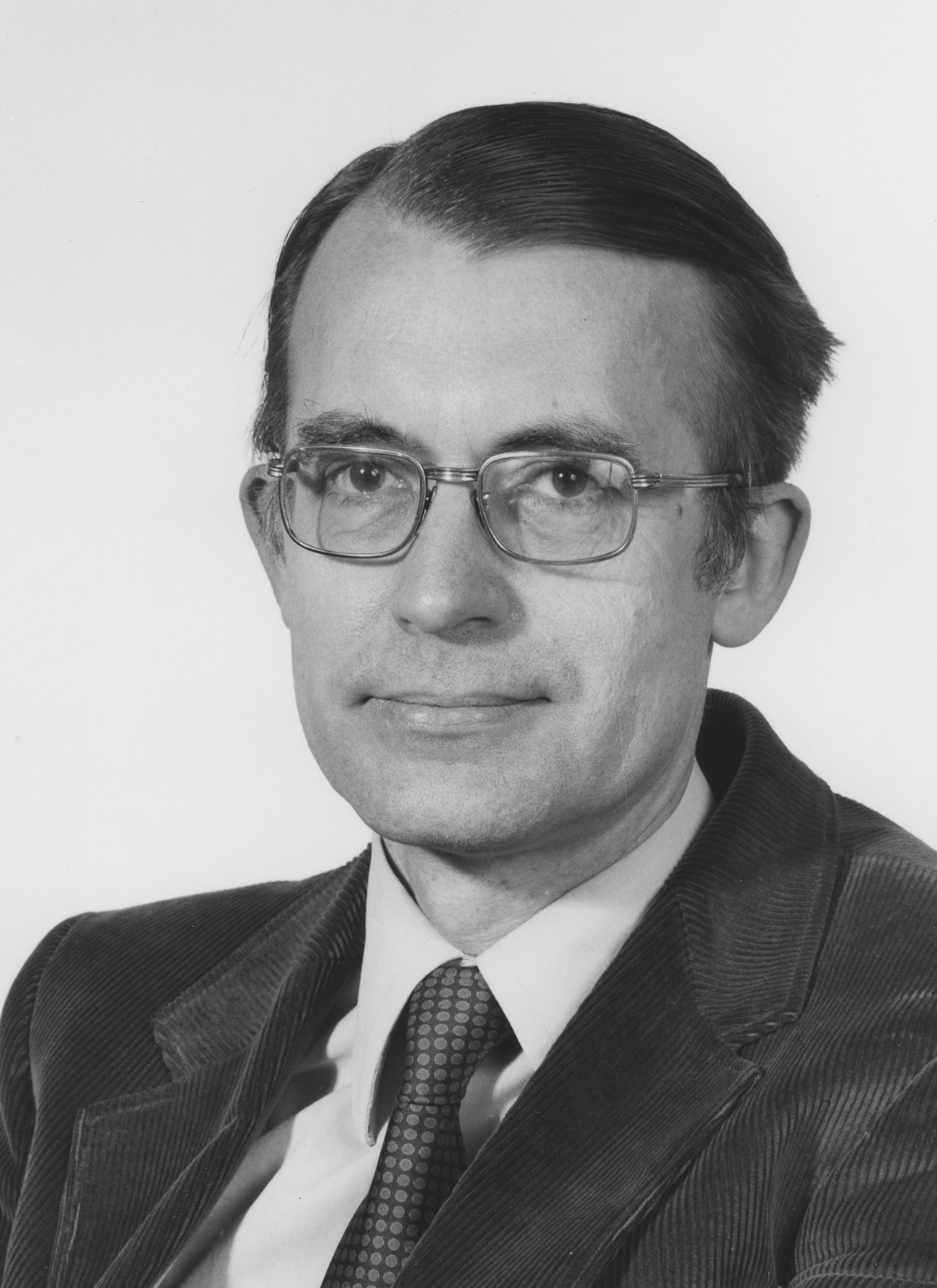
Wrigley, c. 1980s

Sir Edward Anthony Wrigley FBA (17 August 1931 – 24 February 2022) was a British historical demographer. Wrigley and Peter Laslett co-founded the Cambridge Group for the History of Population and Social Structure in 1964.

== Life and career ==
Wrigley was born in Manchester on 17 August 1931. Wrigley's scholarly works focus on demographic history, and the long-term causes and effects of urbanization and industrialization. Among his many publications, Wrigley is known for the book Continuity, Chance and Change, published in 1988, in which he explained why Malthus was wrong about the law of diminishing returns slowing population growth. His most celebrated work, however, is The Population History of England, 1541-1871, published in 1981 with co-author Roger S. Schofield.

Wrigley completed undergraduate and postgraduate courses at Peterhouse, Cambridge between 1949-1958. He was elected as a Fellow of Peterhouse in the latter year and held office until 1979, when he became an Emeritus Fellow there and also Professor of Population Studies at the London School of Economics. He ceased the professorship in 1988 to become a Senior Research Fellow at All Souls College, Oxford and returned to Cambridge as Professor of Economic History for the period 1994-1997. As of 2019, he was an Honorary Fellow at Peterhouse. He was Master of Corpus Christi College, Cambridge from 1994 until 2000, and was elected a Fellow of the British Academy in 1980, serving as president from 1997 to 2001. He was also a member of both the American Philosophical Society and the American Academy of Arts and Sciences. He was the recipient of the 2005 Leverhulme Medal and Prize awarded by the British Academy and in the same year became a Quondam Fellow of All Souls College.

In 1960, Wrigley married Mieke Spelberg, with whom by 1972 he had three daughters and a son. He died in Cambridge on 24 February 2022, aged 90.

== Publications ==
- Industrial growth and population change; a regional study of the coalfield areas of north-west Europe in the later nineteenth century, Cambridge University Press 1961,
- An introduction to English historical demography from the sixteenth to the nineteenth century, editor, Weidenfeld & Nicolson (London) 1966
- Population and history, Weidenfeld & Nicolson (London) 1969, ISBN 0-303-17579-6
- Nineteenth-century society essays in the use of quantitative methods for the study of social data, editor, Cambridge University Press 1972, ISBN 0-521-08412-1
- Population private choice and public policy, The Lindsey Press (London) 1972, The Essex Hall lecture
- Identifying people in the past, Arnold (London) 1973, ISBN 0-7131-5694-5
- Towns in Societies (editor, 1978)
- People, cities, and wealth: the transformation of traditional society, Blackwell 1987, ISBN 0-631-13991-5
- The population history of England, 1541-1871: a reconstruction, Harvard University Press (Cambridge, Mass) 1981, ISBN 0-674-69007-9
- People Cities and Wealth: The Transformation of Traditional Society, Blackwell Publishers 1989, ISBN 0-631-16556-8
- Continuity, Chance and Change: The Character of the Industrial Revolution in England, Cambridge University Press 1990, ISBN 0-521-39657-3
- Poverty, Progress, and Population, Cambridge University Press 2004, ISBN 0-521-82278-5
- English Population History from Family Reconstitution 1580-1837, with R. S. Davies, J. E. Oeppen and R. S. Schofield, Cambridge University Press 2005, ISBN 0-521-02238-X
- Industrial Growth and Population Change, Cambridge University Press 2007, ISBN 0-521-02553-2
- Energy and the English Industrial Revolution, Cambridge University Press 2010, ISBN 978-0-521-76693-7
- The Path to Sustained Growth. England's Transition from an Organic Economy to an Industrial Revolution. Cambridge University Press, 2016, ISBN 978-1-316-50428-4.

Academic offices
Preceded by Michael William McCrum	Master of Corpus Christi College, Cambridge; 1994–2001	Succeeded by Haroon Ahmed
