= Colin Sheppard =

Colin J. R. Sheppard
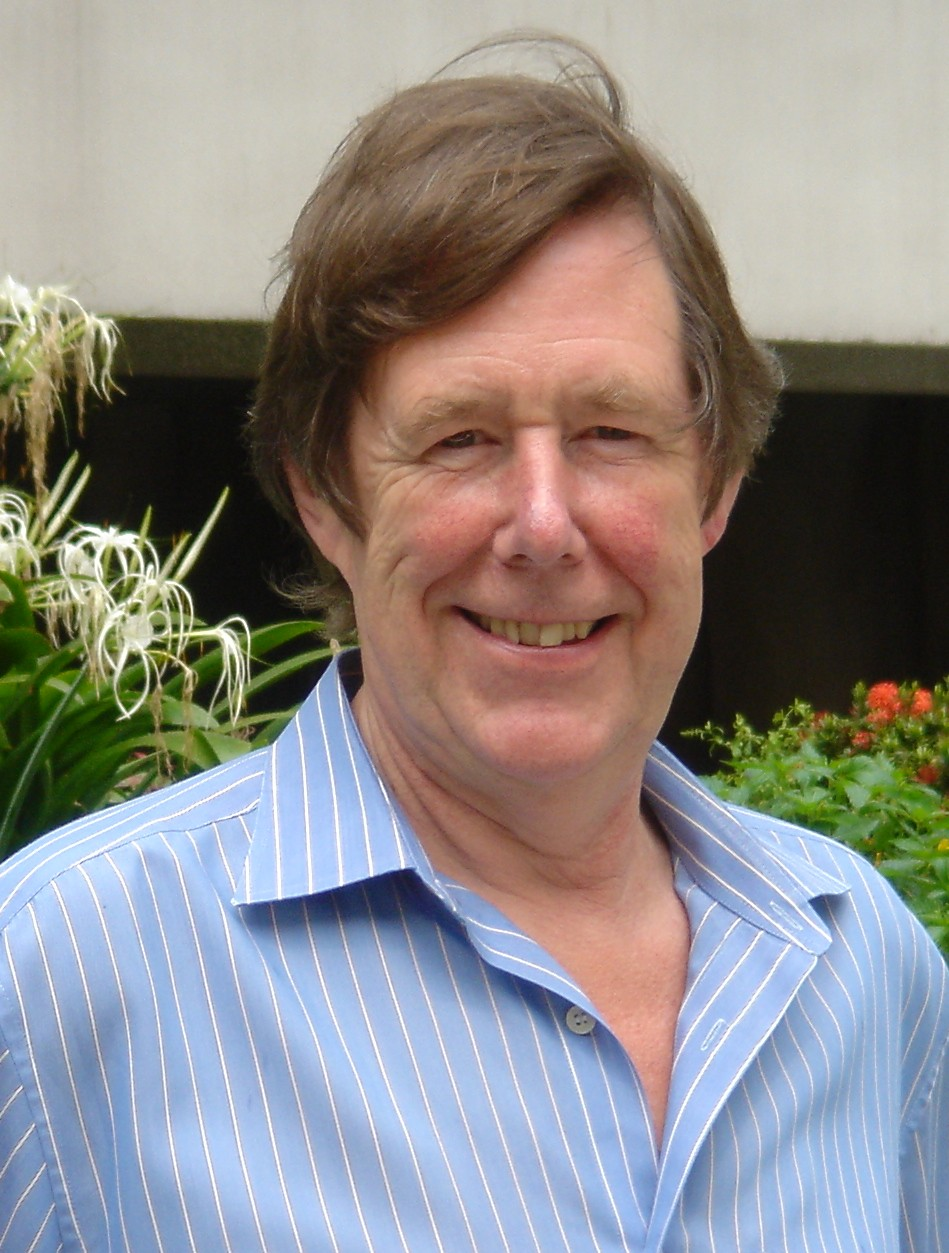
- Education: University of Cambridge, University of Oxford
- Scientific career
- Fields: Optical microscopy
- Workplaces: Italian Institute of Technology
- Thesis: A reflection scanning electron diffractometer and its application to the oxidation of metals (1973)
- Doctoral advisor: Charles Oatley

Colin James Richard Sheppard, usually cited as C. J. R. Sheppard, is senior scientist at the Italian Institute of Technology in Genoa, Italy. His areas of research are in optics, microscopy and imaging, including confocal and multiphoton microscopy, diffraction, 3D imaging and reconstruction, superresolution, beam propagation, and pulse propagation.

== Education ==
Sheppard completed an MA in Engineering from the University of Cambridge from 1965 to 1968. Then, from 1968 to 1972 he completed a PhD, also at the University of Cambridge, titled A reflection scanning electron diffractometer and its application to the oxidation of metals under the direction of Charles William Oatley. He also received a DSc in Physical Sciences from the University of Oxford in 1986.

== Academic career ==
Sheppard is currently senior scientist at the Italian Institute of Technology in Genoa, Italy. Previously, he was professor in the Department of Bioengineering and Faculty of Engineering for National University of Singapore (2003–2012). He has held joint appointments with the NUS departments of biological sciences (Faculty of Science) and diagnostic radiology (School of Medicine). He was SMART (Singapore/MIT Alliance for Research & Technology) Faculty Fellow, and Adjunct Research Staff at SERI (Singapore Eye Research Institute).

He held a Science & Engineering Research Council advanced fellowship (1974–76) and was university lecturer in engineering science at Oxford University (1979–89). He was junior research fellow of St John's College, Oxford (1975–78) and fellow of Pembroke College, Oxford University (1979–89). He was professor of physics at the University of Sydney (1989–2003), and research director of the Australian Key Centre for Microscopy & Microanalysis (1995–2001).

He is supernumerary fellow of Pembroke College Oxford. He has been JSPS fellow at Institute of Industrial Science, Tokyo University (Japan), honorary professor of the University of Sydney, adjunct professor of the University of Western Australia, visiting professor of MIT, invited professor at EPFL (Switzerland), guest professor at TU-Delft (Netherlands), Carl Zeiss visiting professor at University of Jena (Germany), visiting professor at Warsaw University of Technology (Poland) and Lyle Fellow at University of Melbourne (Australia).

He has served as vice-president of the International Commission for Optics (ICO), president of the International Society for Optics Within Life Sciences (OWLS), editor-in-chief of Journal of Optics A: Pure and Applied Optics, and editor of Advances in Optical & Electron Microscopy (Academic Press).

== Awards and honors ==
He has received several awards for his research, including an Alexander von Humboldt Research Award (at the Max Planck Institute for the Science of Light, Erlangen (Germany)), the Institute of Physics Optics and Photonics Division Prize, National Physical Laboratory Metrology Award, British Technology Group Academic Enterprise Award, Institution of Electrical Engineers Gyr and Landis Prize, and a commendation in the Prince of Wales Award for Industrial Innovation & Production.
