= Elizabeth Zelinski =

Gerontologist

Elizabeth Zelinski is an American college professor known for her expertise in gerontechnology, neuroscience, and cognition. She is the Rita and Edward Polusky Chair in Education and Aging Professor of Gerontology and Psychology at the USC Davis School of Gerontology and she heads the Center for Digital Aging. Zelinski studies longitudinal changes in objective cognition and self-reported memory in healthy older adults, interventions to improve their cognition and health effects on cognition in aging.

== Biography ==
Zelinski also has joint appointments in the Psychology Department, Neurosciences and the Study of Women and Men in Society (SWMS) Programs. She is the principal investigator of the Long Beach Longitudinal Study. This study evaluates cognition, memory and language comprehension in older adults as well as the relationship between peoples' perceptions of their memory ability and their actual performance, and how these change as people grow old.

She graduated summa cum laude from Pace University and received her graduate degrees in psychology, with a specialization in aging, from the University of Southern California. Zelinski was a postdoctoral fellow at Claremont Graduate School. She also served as the Interim Dean of the USC Davis School of Gerontology.

== Career ==
Zelinski developed the first comprehensive standardized questionnaire of self-reported memory to determine whether people's beliefs about their memory are echoed in their objective performance. The questionnaire, the Memory Functioning Questionnaire (MFQ), has modest concurrent validity with respect to memory performance and is a better predictor of performance than responses to a yes/no question about memory problems, as commonly used in medical history-taking. Correlates of memory ratings include age, memory performance, depression, health ratings, education, and personality, and these findings translate across my comprehensive longitudinal study of aging (the Long Beach Longitudinal Study) and a nationally representative sample of older adults. Changes in ratings up to 19 years after baseline measurement are modestly associated with increasing age as well as declining objective performance. The MFQ has been used in samples of older adults throughout the United States and other countries. Questionnaires similar to it are in wide use today.

About 25% of the American population over the age of 70 rate their memory abilities as fair or poor. Many older adults are concerned about developing dementia, and recent findings of brain plasticity throughout life have created much interest in brain training to improve cognition. Zelinski's current work shows that cognitive interventions involving repeated practice of simple cognitive skills are effective for improving cognitive abilities of healthy elderly. This is important for alleviating older peoples’ concerns about declines, but may help them to remain independent longer, a major goal of reducing the economic and psychological costs of care for an aging population. She has given many interviews on the subject of cognitive training and gerontechnology, including the popular video game Brain Age.

== Honors ==
- President, Division of Adult Development and Aging, American Psychological Association 2007-2009
- Study section member, NIA HUD-2 (1997-1999), NIH BBBP-4 (1999-2000), NIA-S (2010-2014)
- USC Mortar Board Faculty Member of the Month, September 2000

== Publications ==
- Zelinski, E. M., Gilewski, M. J., & Anthony-Bergstone, C. R. (1990). Memory Functioning Questionnaire: Concurrent validity with memory performance and self-reported memory failures. Psychology and Aging, 5, 388–399.
- Gilewski, M. J., Zelinski, E. M, and Schaie, K. W. (1990). The Memory Functioning Questionnaire. Psychology and Aging, 5, 482–490.
- Zelinski, E. M., Spina, L. M., Yaffe, K., Ruff, R., Kennison, R. F., Mahncke, H. W., & Smith, G. E. (2011). Improvement in Memory with Plasticity-based Adaptive Cognitive Training (IMPACT): Results of the 3-Month Follow-up. Journal of the American Geriatrics Society, 59, 258–265.
- Hindin, S., & Zelinski, E. M. (in press). Extended practice and aerobic exercise interventions benefit untrained cognitive outcomes in older adults: A meta-analysis. Journal of the American Geriatrics Society.
