= Christian Pike =

Gerontologist

Christian Pike is a professor at the Leonard Davis School of Gerontology and a member of the USC Neuroscience Program. His ongoing work focuses on Alzheimer's disease and other age-related neurodegenerative disorders. His laboratory studies the role of neuronal apoptosis in neural diseases. Recently, his research found new use for synthetic estrogens in lessening the effects of Hormone Replacement Therapy for Alzheimer's patients.

== Honors and awards ==
- Turken Award from the Alzheimer's Association
- Trainee, National Institute of Mental Health Predoctoral Training Grant
- Fellow, John Douglas French Alzheimer's Foundation
- Andrus Center Associates, Small Grant Award
- Hanson Family Trust Assistant Professor of Gerontology
- USC Mellon Mentoring Award (Graduate Students)
- Barron AM, Brown MA, Morgan TE, and Pike CJ (2015) Impact of continuous versus discontinuous progesterone on estradiol regulation of neuronal viability and sprouting following entorhinal cortex lesion in female rats. Endocrinology (journal) 156 (3): 1091–1099.
- Yin F, Yao J, Sancheti H, Feng T, Melcangi RC, Morgan TE, Finch CE, Pike CJ, Mack WJ, Cardenas E, and Brinton RD (2015) Perienopause is a bioenergetic transition of female brain characterized by deficits in glucose metabolism and synaptic function. Neurobiology of Aging 36 (7): 2282–2295. doi: 10.1016/j.neurobiolaging.2015.03.013.
- Christensen A and Pike CJ (2015) Menopause, obesity and inflammation: Interactive risk factors for Alzheimer's disease. Frontiers in Aging Neuroscience. 7: 130. doi: 10.3389/fnagi.2015.00130
- Moser VA and Pike CJ (2015) Obesity and sex interact in the regulation Alzheimer's disease. Neuroscience & Behavioral Reviews. In press.
- Cacciottolo M, Christensen A, Moser VA, Liu J, Pike CJ, Morgan TE, Dolzhenko E, Charidimou A, Wahlund L-O, Wilberg K, Chiang GC-Y and Finch CE (in revision) Sex and APOE alleles in the microbleeds and Alzheimer's disease of mice and men. Neurobiology of Aging.

== Patents ==
Compositions and Methods for the Treatment of Alzheimer's Disease.

Filed: May 13, 2013; U.S. Patent Application No. 61/823,872

Inventors: Christian J. Pike, Anna M. Barron

== Professional Activities: Memberships ==
Member, American Association for the Advancement of Science, 1989-1996

Member, Society for Neuroscience, 1991–Present

Member, International Society for Neurochemistry, 1998-2009

Member, Endocrine Society, 2014–Present
