= Eileen M. Crimmins =

American gerontologist

Academic background
- Education: Ph.D. in Demography
- Alma mater: University of Pennsylvania

Academic work
- Discipline: Sociology
- Sub-discipline: Social gerontology
- Institutions: USC Davis School of Gerontology

Eileen M. Crimmins is the AARP Chair in Gerontology at the USC Davis School of Gerontology of the University of Southern California. Her work focuses on the connections between socioeconomic factors and life expectancy and other health outcomes.

== Biography ==
After completing her Ph.D. in Demography from the University of Pennsylvania, Crimmins held positions in population sciences and sociology at the University of Illinois at Chicago. In 1982, she joined the faculty at USC, being promoted to full professor in 1992 and being named director of the USC/UCLA Center on Biodemography and Population Health in 1999. She was elected to the National Academy of Medicine in 2012 and the National Academy of Sciences in 2016.

== Career ==
Crimmins was one of the initial researchers to combine indicators of disability, disease and mortality to examine trends and differentials in healthy life expectancy. This work has been important because it clarifies how improvements in life expectancy can be accompanied by deterioration in population health – e.g. the percent of the population with a disability or the prevalence of heart disease Such insights are essential for understanding the implications of changes in technology and health behaviors for future demands for health care. This work has also clarified the complexity in change in health, e.g. how there can be an increase in the prevalence of major diseases at the same time as there is decreasing disability.

Among many committees and journal boards, she served on the National Academy of Sciences's Panel on Race/Ethnic Health Differentials and was Associate Editor of the Journal of Gerontology. She is the editor-in-chief of Biodemography & Social Biology.

Her 1985 book, The Fertility Revolution: A Supply-Demand Analysis, written with University of Southern California economist Richard Easterlin, was the subject of at least five major reviews, and called "well written" and having "important implications for public policymakers--and their advisers--in the developing countries." Their book was an attempt to find "empirical research to test" the "supply-demand theory of fertility determination." Their work provided the models used in further research (see, for instance, Shireen J. Jejeebhoy, "Women's Status and Fertility," Studies in Family Planning, 22.4 (Jul 1991), pp. 217–230).

Crimmins was one of several editors who published Determining Health Expectancies, (2003 ISBN 978-0-470-84397-0) which addressed "the important question of whether or not we are exchanging longer life for poorer health." The book was based on the research of REVES (Network on Health Expectancy). Most recently, she has co-edited two volumes on aging, Longer Life and Healthy Aging and Human Longevity, Individual Life Duration, and the Growth of the Oldest-old Population (both published by Springer in 2006).

Her work has also been important in clarifying how health differentials in the population arise, and change with age. Crimmins has been a pioneer in the use of the healthy life expectancy approach defined by disease or risk factor states. For instance, men have a higher prevalence of heart disease than women, which comes from their earlier rates of onset of heart disease; however, looking at life cycles of men and women, the length of time spent with heart disease is longer for women.

Other work has shown that women’s longer life with cognitive impairment comes largely from their longer life rather than from more cognitive loss at a given age. Work on race and education differences in life expectancy has emphasized a life cycle approach to health differentials; the earlier “aging” of the disadvantaged occurs through the earlier onset of health conditions among persons of lower SES leading to shorter lives and fewer healthy years. The same approach has been applied to risk factors to show how obesity is related to lower active life expectancy among older people 70, but not to total life expectancy.
