= Emilio Ferrara =

Italian-American computer scientist

- Known for: Detection of social bots, analysis of misinformation on social media platforms
- Awards: 2016 DARPA Young Faculty Award, 2017 Complex Systems Society Junior Scientific Award, 2019 Viterbi Junior Faculty Research Award, 2022 Research.com Rising Stars of Science

Academic background
- Education: University of Messina, TU Wien, Royal Holloway, University of London
- Thesis: Mining and Analysis of Online Social Networks
- Doctoral advisor: Giacomo Fiumara, Alessandro Provetti
- Other advisors: Albert Paccanaro, Georg Gottlob, Filippo Menczer

Academic work
- Discipline: Computer Science, Machine Learning, Network Science, Computational Social Science, Data Science
- Institutions: University of Southern California, Indiana University
- Website: www.emilio.ferrara.name

Emilio Ferrara is an Italian-American computer scientist, researcher, and professor in the field of data science and social networks. As of 2022, he serves as a Full Professor at the University of Southern California (USC), in the Viterbi School of Engineering and USC Annenberg School for Communication, where he conducts research on computational social science, network science, and machine learning. Ferrara is known for his work in the detection of social bots and the analysis of misinformation on social media platforms.

== Early life, education, and career ==
Emilio Ferrara received his Bachelor's degree, Master's degree, and Ph.D. in Computer Science from the University of Messina. During his doctoral studies, Ferrara spent one semester at the Technical University of Vienna and two semesters at the Royal Holloway, University of London. While a visiting Ph.D. student at the TU Vienna, Ferrara studied data mining in the research group of Professor Georg Gottlob. At Royal Holloway, University of London, he studied machine learning under the supervision of Professor Alberto Paccanaro.

After completing his doctoral studies, Ferrara held various academic positions, first at Indiana University and then at the University of Southern California, where, in 2022, he was promoted to Full Professor.

== Research ==
Ferrara's research focuses on computational social science, network science, and machine learning, with an emphasis on understanding and modeling human behavior in online social networks. He has made significant contributions to the areas of social bot detection, political manipulation, the analysis of misinformation, disinformation, and conspiracy theories, the dynamics of emotional contagion on social media platforms, and generative AI bias.

== Awards and honors ==
Emilio Ferrara has received numerous awards and honors for his research, including:

- The 2016 DARPA Young Faculty Award
- The 2017 Complex Systems Society Junior Scientific Award
- The 2019 Viterbi Junior Faculty Research Award
- The 2022 Research.com Rising Stars of Science
- He was elected AAAI Fellow in the 2025 Class

== Influence on US Senate investigation into Russian interference in the 2016 US Election ==
Ferrara's research contributed to the understanding of the extent and impact of foreign interference in the 2016 US Presidential election. His paper titled "Social bots distort the 2016 US Presidential election online discussion," which was the only peer-reviewed paper published before the November 8, 2016 election, investigated the influence operations carried out by Russia's Internet Research Agency by means of social bots on Twitter.

The paper suggested that social bots had a notable impact on the dynamics of the online conversation surrounding the election, potentially manipulating public opinion and shaping the discourse. This work provided insights into how social bots were utilized as a tool for information warfare and highlighted the potential consequences of their unchecked proliferation on social media platforms.

Ferrara's findings attracted the attention of the US Senate, which cited his research during the investigation into Russian interference in the 2016 election. His work contributed to the understanding of the scope and tactics used by foreign actors to sway public opinion and played a role in shaping the response to this challenge to the democratic process.

== Twitter vs. Musk Litigation ==
Ferrara served as an expert trial witness for the Delaware Court of Chancery on the subject of false and spam accounts in the context of the litigation between Twitter and Elon Musk.
