= Thomas A. Rando =

American neurologist

- Born: 1957 (age 68–69); Brooklyn, NY

Academic background
- Education: Harvard College; Harvard Medical School

Academic work
- Discipline: Neurology, stem cell biology, biology of aging, regenerative medicine, tissue engineering
- Institutions: Stanford University School of Medicine, University of California, Los Angeles

Thomas A. Rando is an American stem cell biologist and neurologist, best known for his research on basic mechanisms of stem cell biology and the biology of aging. He is the Director of the Eli and Edythe Broad Center of Regenerative Medicine and Stem Cell Research and a professor of Neurology and Molecular, Cell and Developmental Biology at the University of California, Los Angeles. Prior to joining the UCLA faculty, he served as Professor of Neurology and Neurological Sciences at Stanford University School of Medicine, where he was also founding director of the Glenn Center for the Biology of Aging. His additional roles while at Stanford included co-founder and deputy director of the Stanford Center on Longevity, founding director of Stanford's Muscular Dystrophy Association Clinic, and Chief of Neurology at the VA Palo Alto Health Care System.

== Biography ==
Rando was born in Brooklyn, New York, and grew up in Maine. He earned a bachelor's degree from Harvard College in biochemistry in 1979, and an MD from Harvard Medical School and PhD in cell and developmental biology from Harvard University in 1987. He interned at Massachusetts General Hospital and completed his residency in neurology at the University of California, San Francisco. He joined Stanford's Department of Molecular Pharmacology as a research fellow in 1991, and joined Stanford's medical school faculty in 1995. He relocated to Los Angeles to join the UCLA faculty in 2021. Rando is also a founder of Fountain Therapeutics.

== Research ==
Rando's research on stem cells has addressed how stem cells in tissues throughout the body maintain their potency to participate in tissue homeostasis and tissue repair throughout the life of an organism. Through these studies, his laboratory has explored the basic mechanisms by which stem cells maintain a dormant, or "quiescent" state, when not engage in generation of new tissue. They have demonstrated how the depth of stem cell quiescence influences the potency of those cells to participate in tissue repair and regeneration. These findings have led to advances in studies of stem cell therapeutics in the broader field of regenerative medicine.

In 2005, Rando's laboratory was the first to use the technique of heterochronic parabiosis to explore the effects of the systemic circulation on stem cell function. Rando's group has pioneered studies of the epigenetics of stem cell aging, exploring the role of "epigenetic rejuvenation" as an explanation for the paradigm-shifting findings of heterochronic parabiosis. These studies have revealed how exercise itself can lead to rejuvenation of aged stem cells. Their studies focus on physiologic, pharmacologic, genetic, and dietary interventions to reverse cellular aging and to produce therapies for aging-related diseases.

Rando's research interests also include muscular dystrophies, tissue engineering, and regenerative rehabilitation.

== Honors ==
- Member, American Neurological Association (2000)
- National Institute of Health Pioneer Award (2005)
- American Federation for Aging Research Breakthroughs in Gerontology (BIG) Award (2008)
- National Institute of Health Transformative Research Award (2013)
- Fellow, American Association for the Advancement of Science (2015)
- Member, National Academy of Medicine (2016)
- Member, American Academy of Arts and Sciences (2020)
- NOMIS Distinguished Scientist and Scholar Award (2022)
