= Los Angeles Jewish Health =

American non-profit provider for senior healthcare services

Los Angeles Jewish Health, previously known as Los Angeles Jewish Home, is a non-profit provider for senior healthcare services in Los Angeles, California. Over the past century, the organisation has focused on providing healthcare services for seniors in the greater Los Angeles area.

== History ==
On Passover, 1912, the Los Angeles Jewish Home began when a small group of neighbors gave shelter to five homeless Jewish men.

In 1916, the first permanent structure for the Home was purchased in the Boyle Heights section of downtown Los Angeles. The Jewish Home made plans for a facility in the San Fernando Valley of Los Angeles. This facility became known as the California Home for the Aged.

In the 1940s and 1950s, the Home built new facilities and senior residences in Reseda in the San Fernando Valley. The new site became known as the Grancell Village Campus.

In 1972, the California Home for the Aged was renamed Menorah Village. Four years later, the original Jewish Home for the Aged moved to a new location in the Reseda area of the San Fernando Valley. The two San Fernando Valley locations merged, becoming the Jewish Home for the Aging of greater Los Angeles and, ultimately, the Los Angeles Jewish Home.

Throughout the 1980s and 1990s, the home constructed new clinics, residences, and facilities as the resident population grew. The Victory Boulevard Campus was named the Eisenberg Village Campus.

In 2002, the Goldenberg•Ziman Special Care Center for Alzheimer's disease and age-related dementia opened.

In 2007, the Joyce Eisenberg-Keefer Medical Center on the Grancell Village Campus opened. The complex had an acute psychiatric hospital, 239 nursing beds, and a geriatric research center.

In 2012, Brandman Centers for Senior Care (BCSC) opened, a Program of All-inclusive Care for the Elderly (PACE).

In 2017, the Gonda Healthy Aging Westside Campus opened, featuring Fountainview at Gonda Westside, a CCRC community in the Playa Vista area of West Los Angeles. It contained 175 independent living Brandman Residences and 24 residential units for assisted living and memory care. The facility was sold to Senior Resource Group in 2024.

In 2022, the Los Angeles Jewish Home was renamed to Los Angeles Jewish Health.

== Services offered ==
Los Angeles Jewish Health's Reseda campuses offer independent living, residential care, skilled nursing care, short-term rehabilitation, and Alzheimer's disease and dementia care. Los Angeles Jewish Health's Gonda Healthy Aging Westside Campus in Playa Vista offers independent living as well as assisted living and memory care.

The Brandman Centers for Senior Care provide quality medical care that promotes independence for seniors through PACE, which coordinates and provides all needed preventive, primary, acute, and long-term care services to older adults so they may live at home in their communities. The PACE model of care revolves around a fully integrated, interdisciplinary team of doctors, nurses, therapists, social workers, dietitians, drivers, and others who provide direct care and services to meet each program participant's needs.

The Auerbach Geriatric Psychiatry Unit focuses on providing care for various conditions, such as bipolar disorder, depression, and schizophrenia.

The Goldenberg-Ziman Special Care Center provides nursing care for seniors with Alzheimer's disease and age-related dementia.

== Annual events ==
Los Angeles Jewish Health hosts a Mothers Day celebration each year for each mother, grandmother, great-grandmother and great-great-grandmother. The celebration began over two decades ago.

Los Angeles Jewish Health hosts an annual day-long golfing event, to raise money for the organisation.

== Notes ==
Abram, Susan, “A century of love and care celebrated at Los Angeles Jewish Home,” Los Angeles Daily News, January 8, 2012. https://www.dailynews.com/2012/01/08/a-century-of-love-and-care-celebrated-at-los-angeles-jewish-home/

Bartholomew, Dana, “Los Angeles Jewish Home in Reseda offering new medical care for seniors,” Los Angeles Daily News, March 19, 2013. https://www.dailynews.com/2013/03/19/los-angeles-jewish-home-in-reseda-offering-new-medical-care-for-seniors/

Berrin, Danielle, “Molly Forrest plans the future at the Los Angeles Jewish Home,” Jewish Journal, Oct 23, 2014. https://jewishjournal.com/cover_story/134353/

Day, Nellie, “Los Angeles Jewish Home Begins Constructions on $100M Fountainview at Gonda,” ReBusiness Online, September 12, 2014. https://rebusinessonline.com/los-angeles-jewish-home-begins-construction-on-100m-fountainview-at-gonda/

Eckerling, Debra L., “Temple Judea Students Enjoy ‘Respecting Elders’,” Jewish Journal, December 19, 2018. https://jewishjournal.com/news/los_angeles/community/291378/temple-judea-students-enjoy-respecting-elders/

Fountainview at Eisenberg Village. (n.d.) Continuing Care Retirement Community. Retrieved 1-2-19 from http://www.fountainviewjha.com/about/continuous-care-retirement

Fountainview at Gonda. (n.d.). Innovative and Luxurious Apartments for Independent Living. Retrieved 1-2-19 from http://www.fountainviewgonda.com/about-us/

Haynes, Karima A, “Jewish Home for the Aging Will Launch $72 Million Campaign,” Los Angeles Times, March 11, 2000. https://www.latimes.com/archives/la-xpm-2000-mar-11-me-7746-story.html

Healthcare for People. (n.d.). Jewish Home Care Services. Retrieved 1-2-19 from https://www.healthcare4ppl.com/home-health/california/encino/jewish-home-care-services-059170.html

Jewish Museum of the American West. (2018). The Los Angeles Jewish Home for the Aging began as the Hebrew Sheltering Society – 1908. Retrieved 1-2-19 from: http://www.jmaw.org/jewish-home-los-angeles/

Leading Age California. (Oct 5, 2011). Handy to Lecture at Los Angeles Jewish Home's 14th Annual Sarnat Symposium. Retrieved 1-3-19 from https://leadingageca.wordpress.com/2011/10/05/handy-to-lecture-at-los-angeles-jewish-homes-14th-annual-sarnat-symposium/

Los Angeles Jewish Home. (n.d.). Short-Term Rehabilitation. Retrieved 1-2-19 from http://www.lajh.org/care/place-to-live/short-term/ida-kayne-transitional-care-unit/

Los Angeles Jewish Home. (n.d.). Skilled Nursing. Retrieved 1-2-19 from http://www.lajh.org/care/place-to-live/long-term/skilled-nursing/

Nelson Hardiman. (n.d.) Events. Retrieved 1-3-19 from https://www.nelsonhardiman.com/events/senior-care-2028-whats-ahead-for-medicare-health-policy-and-delivery-of-care-for-aging-seniors/

Ritsch, Massie and Laura Loh, “A Big Day in the Sun for Southland Moms,” Los Angeles Times, May 13, 2002. https://www.latimes.com/archives/la-xpm-2002-may-13-me-mother13-story.html

Seniors Housing Business. (June 22, 2018). LeadingAge California Selects Los Angeles Jewish Home CEO Molly Forrest as Chair. Retrieved 1-3-19 from http://www.seniorshousingbusiness.com/the-latest-news/leadingage-california-selects-los-angeles-jewish-home-ceo-molly-forrest-as-chair

Skirball Hospice. (n.d.). Are You Considering Hospice Care? Retrieved 1-2-19 from http://skirballhospice.org/about/default.asp

Skirball Hospice. (n.d.). Skirball Hospice History. Retrieved 1-2-19 from http://skirballhospice.org/about/history.asp

Skirball Hospice. (n.d.). Palliative Medicine for Pain and Symptom Management. Retrieved 1-2-19 from http://skirballhospice.org/services/palliative-care.asp

Suffolk. (n.d.). Fountainview at Eisenberg Village. Retrieved 1-2-19 from https://www.suffolk.com/projects/fountainview-eisenberg-village-reseda-california

Torok, Ryan, “Moving & Shaking,” Jewish Journal, April 5, 2018. https://jewishjournal.com/news/los_angeles/moving-shaking/232783/moving-shaking-march-lives-big-brothers-seder/

Ward Biederman, Patricia, “Home Has Care in Mind,” Los Angeles Times, April 14, 2002. https://www.latimes.com/archives/la-xpm-2002-apr-14-me-memory14-story.html
