= Caleb Finch =

American gerontologist (born 1939)

- Born: July 4, 1939 (age 87); London, England

Academic background
- Education: Yale University (BS); Rockefeller University (PhD)

Academic work
- Discipline: Biology; Gerontology
- Sub-discipline: Cell biology Alzheimer's disease
- Institutions: USC Davis School of Gerontology

Caleb Ellicott Finch (born July 4, 1939) is an American academic who is a University Professor Emeritus at the USC Davis School of Gerontology. Finch's research focuses on aging in humans, with a specialization in cell biology and Alzheimer's disease.

== Early life and education ==
Finch was born in London in 1939, the son of American parents. At the time of his birth, his father was working for London branch of the National City Bank of New York. After the start of World War II, his family returned to New York City. Finch earned a Bachelor of Science degree in biophysics from Yale University, where he credits Carl Woese with suggesting he focus on aging, and a PhD in biology from Rockefeller University.

== Career ==
He was the founding director of USC's NIH-funded Alzheimer Disease Research Center in 1984. In 1989, the university made him one of its twelve "University Distinguished Professors". He is a full professor in gerontology and biological sciences and an adjunct professor in departments of anthropology, psychology, physiology, and neurology. He was the chair of the National Research Council Committee on Biodemography of Aging. He is co-author of 520 scientific papers and six books, including The Biology of Human Longevity (Academic Press, 2007) and "The Role of Global Air Pollution in Aging and Disease" (Academic Press, 2017). He serves on the Scientific Advisory Board for the Cure Alzheimer's Fund.

In 1997, Finch co-edited Between Zeus and the Salmon: The Biodemography of Longevity with Kenneth W. Wachter for the National Academy Press, a volume that helped establish the interdisciplinary field of biodemography.

== Awards ==
Finch has received most of the major awards in biomedical gerontology, including the Robert W. Kleemeier Award of the Gerontological Society of America in 1985, the Sandoz Premier Prize by the International Geriatric Association in 1995, and the Irving Wright Award of AFAR and the Research Award of AGE in 1999.
