= Suresh Rattan =

Indian biogerontologist

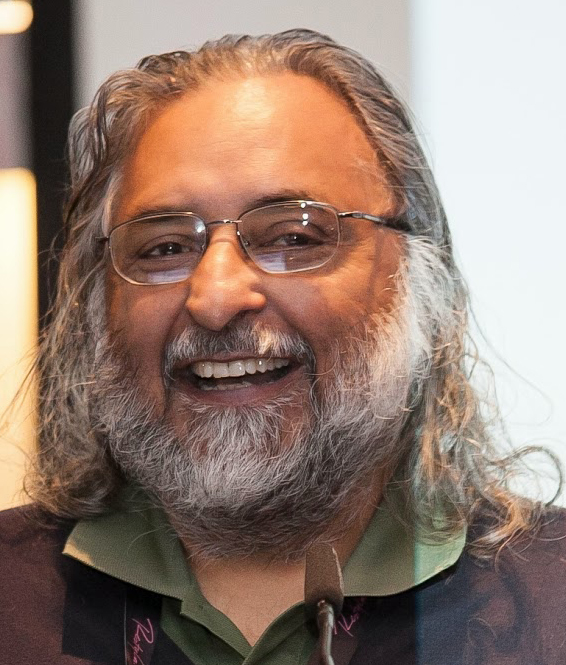
- Suresh I. S. Rattan, biogerontologist at the Aarhus University's Department of Molecular Biology and Genetics
- Born: 1955 (age 70–71); Amritsar, India
- Education: Guru Nanak Dev University, Amritsar, Jawaharlal Nehru University, New Delhi, National Institute for Medical Research, Mill Hill, London
- Known for: Gerontogenes anti-aging effects of kinetin and zeatin Hormesis and hormetins
- Scientific career
- Fields: Biogerontology
- Workplaces: Aarhus University
- Doctoral advisor: Drs. Robin Holliday and Ian Buchanan

Suresh Rattan (full name: Suresh Inder Singh Rattan; born in 1955 in Amritsar, India) is a biogerontologist – a researcher in the field of biology of ageing, biogerontology.

In addition to his professional research work on the biology of ageing, he is also very much interested and involved in the public communication of science and he likes to undertake explorations in the Indian classical music and semi-classical music by playing Tabla – the North Indian drums, as evident from music CDs "State of the Art: Small Town People" by Harry Jokumsen and other artists (2008), and "The Fall and the Rise of a Woman" by Pearl (2014) in which he plays Tabla under his artistic name Shashi Maharaj.

== Academic background ==
Suresh Rattan has been heading, since its inception in 1984, the Laboratory of Cellular Ageing at the Department of Molecular Biology and Genetics at the Aarhus University in Denmark, where he has become Emeritus since 2020. He was introduced to the field of ageing by Professor Suraj P. Sharma at the Guru Nanak Dev University (GNDU), Amritsar, India, during his BSc and MSc studies (1973–1977), followed by MPhil studies on the regenerative capacity of Hydra, under the guidance of Professor Sivatosh Mookerjee, at the School of Life Sciences, Jawaharlal Nehru University (JNU), New Delhi, India (1977–1979). Suresh Rattan earned his PhD in 1982 from the National Institute for Medical Research, Mill Hill, London, UK, based on his research project testing the error theory of cellular ageing, under the supervision of Dr. Robin Holliday FRS, and Dr. Ian Buchanan. He also earned the degree of Doctor of Science (DSc) in 1995, from the Faculty of Natural Sciences, University of Aarhus, Denmark, based on his post-PhD research work on the molecular biology of human cellular ageing. He is also the recipient of an Honorary Doctorate from the Russian Academy of Medical Sciences for his "...fruitful research and training in the field of biology of ageing, as well as his outstanding contribution to dissemination of scientific knowledge in basic gerontology...". He has been awarded a Visiting Professorship at the Faculty of Science, Palacky University in Olomouc, Czech Republic (2012–2016). The British Society for Research on Ageing (BSRA) has awarded their prestigious Lord Cohen Medal to Suresh Rattan for his continuing contributions to gerontology. He was unanimously elected as the President/Chair of the Biological Section of the European Region of the International Association of Gerontology and Geriatrics (IAGG-ER) for the periods 2011–2015, 2015 to 2019, and again for the period 2019–2023. He was given the Outstanding Career Achievement Award - 2017, by the International Dose Response Society, USA and the Lifetime Acheivement Award by the NUS Healthy Longevity Academy, Singapore, 2026

Suresh Rattan has published over 300 research and review articles and about 20 books on the biology of ageing, including those for school children and general public. He is the founding Editor-in-Chief of Biogerontology, a leading peer reviewed journal in the field of ageing. His name has been included in Marquis Who's Who in the World (from 1993); Marquis Who's Who in Medicine and Healthcare (from 1998); and International Directory of Distinguished Leadership (from 1998). He was a member of the World Economic Forum's Global Agenda Council on Gerontology (2008–2009).

== Important contributions ==
Suresh Rattan's major intellectual contribution in gerontology is the formulation of the concepts of essential lifespan and virtual gerontogenes regarding the nature of genes involved in ageing that real gerontogenes do not exist. Additionally, in the area of ageing modulation, Suresh Rattan is credited with the sole inventorship for discovering the anti-ageing effects of kinetin and zeatin in human skin cells; and these compounds are being used in several skin-care cosmetics throughout the world, for example Valeant product Kinerase. His areas of expertise include ageing, anti-ageing and healthy ageing of human cells, specially fibroblasts, keratinocytes, osteoblasts, and bone marrow stem cells. His current research focuses on the beneficial effects of mild stress, Hormesis, and discovering hormetins (a new category of natural and synthetic compounds which bring about their beneficial effects through hormesis) for slowing down ageing and improving the quality of life in old age. The first skincare product to come out of the theory of hormesis is the Vaxin for Youth from Givenchy. He has also put forward the terms for the science and study of hormesis, and "hormetin" for any condition that can bring about hormesis "hormetics".

== Books ==
Suresh Rattan has written/edited/co-edited the following books on ageing in English, Punjabi and Danish:

=== In English ===
- Supplemets and Drugs for Health and Longevity, Editors: Suresh I.S. Rattan and Ceren Gezer; volume 22 in the book series “Healthy Ageing and Longevity”, Springer Nature, Switzerland, 2026; ISBN 978-3-032-11607-9
- Brain and Mental Health in Ageing, Editors: Gurcharan Kaur and Suresh I.S. Rattan; volume 21 in the book series “Healthy Ageing and Longevity”, Springer Nature, Switzerland, 2024; ISBN 978-3-031-68512-5
- Successful Ageing: Ambition and Ambivalence, Authors: Clemens Tesch-Romer, Hans-Werner Wahl, Suresh I.S. Rattan, and Liat Ayalon; Oxford University Press, UK; 2021 ISBN 9780192897534
- Nutrition, Food and Diet in Ageing and Longevity, Editors: Suresh I.S. Rattan and Gurcharan Kaur; volume 14 in the book series "Healthy Ageing and Longevity", Springer Nature, Switzerland, 2021 ISBN 978-3-030-83016-8
- Explaining Health Across the Sciences, Editors: Jonathan Sholl and Suresh I.S. Rattan; volume 12 in the book series "Healthy Ageing and Longevity", Springer Nature, Switzerland, 2020 ISBN 978-3-030-52663-4
- Encyclopedia of Biomedical Gerontology, Editor-in-Chief: Suresh I.S. Rattan; 3 volumes, Elsevier/Academic Press; 2020 ISBN 978-0-12-816075-6
- The Science of Hormesis in Health and Longevity, Academic Press UK; 2019 ISBN 978-3-319-63000-7
- AGE, in the series Reflections, by Aarhus University Press, 2018 ISBN 978-87-7184-735-2
- Hormones in Ageing and Longevity, 2017 ISBN 978-3-319-63000-7 doi:10.1007/978-3-319-63001-4
- Cellular Ageing and Replicative Senescence, 2016 (ISBN 978-3-319-26237-6 )
- Hormesis in Health and Disease, 2014 (ISBN 978-148-2205459)
- Brain Aging and Therapeutic Interventions, 2012 (ISBN 978-94-007-5236-8)
- Calorie Restriction, Aging, and Longevity, 2010 (ISBN 978-90-481-8555-9)
- Mild Stress and Healthy Aging: Applying hormesis in ageing research and interventions, 2008 (ISBN 978-1-4020-6868-3)
- Healthy Aging and Longevity, 2007 (ISBN 978-1-57331-680-4)
- Biogerontology: Mechanisms and Interventions, 2007 (ISBN 978-1-57331-679-8)
- Prevention and Treatment of Age-related Diseases (ISBN 978-1-4020-4884-5)
- Understanding and Modulating Aging, 2006 (ISBN 978-1-57331-599-9)
- Aging Interventions and Therapies, 2005 (ISBN 981-256-084-X)
- Biological Aging and Its Modulation, 2003 (ISBN 1-4020-1369-8)
- Molecular Gerontology: Research Status and Strategies, 1996 (ISBN 0-306-45491-2)
- Where's Baba Gone?, 1999, 2001, 2012 (ISBN 81-87510-20-X)- a popular science-in-fiction book for children., also published in Punjabi

(Gurmukhi and Shahmukhi scripts), Hindi (Devnagri script), Polish and Romanian languages.

=== In Punjabi, Hindi and other languages ===
- ਬਾਬਾ ਕਿੱਥੇ ਗਏ, 1997, 2001 (ISBN 81-87510-05-6)- (Where's Baba Gone?; also in Polish as Dokad Odchodzisz?, 2009; (ISBN 978-83-928015-1-1); in Hindi as बाबा कहाँ गए? (2011; ISBN 81-87510-19-6); and in Romanian as Unde Sa-Dus Baba? (2012; ISBN 978-606-588-391-8)
- ਧਰਮ, ਮਨੁਖਤਾ ਤੇ ਵਿਗਿਆਨ, 2003 (Religion, Humanity, and Science) – a collection of essays.

=== In Danish ===
- E=GMC2 – formlen for evig ungdom (ISBN 87-7417-685-4)(E=GMC2 – The Formula for Eternal Youth)
- ALDER - in the series Tænkepause, published by Aarhus University Press, 2017 (ISBN 978-87-7124-924-8); also published in English as AGE, by Aarhus University Press, and in Polish and Turkish languages.

== See also ==
- Hormesis
- Life extension
- Senescence
