= Lord Cohen =

Lord Cohen may refer to:

- Lionel Cohen, Baron Cohen (1888–1973), British judge
- Henry Cohen, 1st Baron Cohen of Birkenhead (1900–1977), British doctor
- Lord Cohen Medal, a British prize for services to gerontology named after the above
