= Elaine Brody =

American sociologist and gerontologist

Elaine M. Brody
- Born: Elaine Marjorie Breslow; December 4, 1922; New York City, United States
- Died: July 9, 2014 (aged 91); San Mateo, California, United States
- Education: City College of New York; University of Pittsburgh
- Spouse: Stanley J. Brody (m. 1943; died 1997)
- Children: 2
- Scientific career
- Fields: Gerontology
- Workplaces: Philadelphia Geriatric Center

Elaine Marjorie Brody (née Breslow; December 4, 1922 – July 9, 2014) was an American gerontologist and sociologist, who studied cases on elderly Americans tended to by caregivers. In a career lasting six decades, she was one of the first social workers to research her clients, particularly of "women in the middle", a term she used to refer to women who raised their children and cared for their elderly parents simultaneously. Brody contributed to the foundation of gerontology, and her works established a precedent in this field.

After graduating from the City College of New York, Brody left the University of Pittsburgh with a master's degree in social work. She was employed as director of human resources and associate director at the Philadelphia Geriatric Center, which later expanded to researching the effects of aging elderly persons and their families. Additionally, Brody taught psychiatry at the Perelman School of Medicine at the University of Pennsylvania, and served on several editorial boards of professional journals and review committees of multiple foundations. Brody published more than 200 academic articles and six books on her research and received numerous awards for it.

== Early life ==
Brody was born on December 4, 1922, in New York City, to dentist William J. Breslow and his bookkeeper and wife Frieda Horowitz. In 1942. she graduated from City College of New York, and married future University of Pennsylvania aging and public policy expert Stanley J. Brody (died 1997) a year later. While Brody's husband was serving in the United States Navy during World War II, he encouraged her to enroll in graduate school. In 1945, she earned a master's degree in social work from the University of Pittsburgh. After her husband returned from active service, Brody became a mother of two children, a son and a daughter.

== Career ==
In 1957, she began seeking part-time employment in psychiatric social work with children, and wanted this arrangement so she could care for her own school age offspring in the afternoon. Brody could not find work with children, and accepted a position as director of the department of human resources and associate director at the Philadelphia Geriatric Center (PGC) (now the Abramson Center for Jewish Life), a home for elderly Jewish women. She said she trained to work with children and not the elderly although she came to like working at the PGC: "It was the only place I ever worked, but because the PGC was constantly changing, it always felt new." Brody assisted other researchers in transforming the PGC and its Polisher Institute to leaders in elderly care and gerontology by expanding from around 150 to 1,500 beds. She also taught at the Perelman School of Medicine at the University of Pennsylvania, serving as adjunct associate professor of social work in psychiatry, and was the Polisher Institute's associate director of research.

In 1969, she and M. Powell Lawton developed a disability measure called the Physical Self-Maintenance Scale to use in the planning and evaluation of treatment for elderly people in the community and institutions. Brody led a $250,000 study on individualized treatment of elderly persons who were mentally impaired, and testified before the United States Senate Special Committee on Aging that same year, noting few studies on the aged population of the United States had been done in the prior 15 years. In 1971, she was made head of a project to prepare a manual of long-term care for the elderly for use by agency social workers, administrators, nurses, and physicians to help them understand the potential of social work in caring and treating the elderly. Brody conducted an institute on “Problems Affecting the Family in the Aging Process” in 1973, which investigated the changes in the family structure in the 20th century.

A nursing home social work book, A Social Work Guide for Long Term Care Facilities, was written by her along with other contributors and published in 1974. The book has an overview of long-term care facilities and provided the reader with insights into the role of a facility social worker. Five years later, Brody and Linda B. Davis co-authored the book Rape and Older Women, which examined the extent and consequences for women over the age of 50 who had been sexually assaulted. She became president of the Gerontological Society of America (GSA) in 1980, becoming the fourth woman to serve in the role, and was named the winner of the University of Pittsburgh School of Social Work's Distinguished Alumni Award two years later. In 1983, Brody was named the recipient of the Donald P. Kent Award by the GSA. She exposed a misconception "that adult children nowadays do not take care of their elderly parents as was the case in the good old days" in 1985.

Brody conducted a study in 1986 that discovered 28 percent of females stayed at home to care for their elderly mothers and left the workforce to do so. She advised employers to provide adaptable working hours, and provide them with bereavement leave had been a death in the affected person's family. In January that year, Brody was named a Woman of the Year by Ms. magazine, for recording difficulties faced by "women in the middle", a term she used to refer to working mothers bringing up their children and caring for their elderly parents simultaneously. She wrote another book, Parent Care as a Normative Family Stress, which was published in 1986 and cited by others. In the next year, the Medical College of Pennsylvania gave Brody an honorary doctorate, and retired from the PGC in 1988 after 31 years.

She was also made a distinguished Scholar of the National Academies of Practice, and from 1987 to 1992, was a member of the Congressional Advisory Panel on Alzheimer's disease. Brody also worked on multiple editorial boards of professional journals, and the review committee of the National Institute of Mental Health and other foundations and directed fifteen research studies on multiple issues that were funded by the federal state. In 1990, another book she wrote, Women in the Middle: Their Parent Care Years, was published after interviewing adult children who cared for their elderly parents, particularly women. It examined pressures, trends and values that created problems in women doing elderly care as they brought up their children at the same time. The GSA selected Brody as the recipient of the M. Powell Lawton Award in 2007 to recognize "a significant contribution in gerontology that has led to an innovation in gerontological treatment, practice or service, prevention, amelioration of symptoms or barriers, or a public policy change that has led to some practical application that improves the lives of older persons."

Her last book, On Being Very, Very Old: An Insider’s Perspective, was published in 2009; it describes the improvement of older individuals and compares it from decades beforehand. Brody also talks about how the Great Depression influenced her comprehension of poverty and the likely collapse of a family. Overall she published more than 200 academic works and six books in a career lasting six decades. Brody died of respiratory failure at her home in San Mateo, California, on July 9, 2014. A service commemorating her life was held in California on July 14.

== Legacy ==
The National Association of Social Workers called Brody "one of the first social work practitioners to simultaneously conduct research of clients" and noted her works allowed to establish specialized aging studies. Her co-worker, director of Research and Evaluation at the Philadelphia Corporation for Aging Allen Glicksman, stated she was an important factor in helping social workers to become researchers, "She was a path-breaker in showing that social work matters. She demonstrated this and — through research — made colleagues pay attention. She made a difference at the research level and also the policy level. She set the pattern."

Her research on elderly individuals contributed to the establishment of gerontology and her efforts serve as a precedent for researching this field. Before Brody began her studying, the elderly were perceived as "poor, sick [...] isolated social atoms". According to professor of psychiatry at University of California, San Diego Barry D. Lebowitz, "Elaine was really among the very first people to say, 'No, no, no, that's a cliche, a myth, a distortion'. She said most older people are deeply embedded in the lives of families and the family is really the thing we ought to be talking about." She provided coverage of research, policy, and practice with her ability to combine the intersections of economic pressure and gender, and was informed of a resistance to family propaganda by being knowledgeable on the state of long-term care.
