= Diversity (politics) =

Concept in sociology and political studies

Diversity within groups is a key concept in sociology and political science that refers to the degree of difference along socially significant identifying features among the members of a purposefully defined group, such as any group differences in racial or ethnic classifications, age, gender, religion, philosophy, politics, culture, language, physical abilities, socioeconomic background, sexual orientation, gender identity, intelligence, physical health, mental health, genetic attributes, personality, behavior, or attractiveness.

When measuring human diversity, a diversity index exemplifies the likelihood that two randomly selected residents have different ethnicities. If all residents are of the same ethnic group it is zero by definition. If half are from one group and half from another, it is 50. The diversity index does not take into account the willingness of individuals to cooperate with those of other ethnicities.

== International human rights ==
The Convention on the Rights of Persons with Disabilities affirms to "respect difference and acceptance of persons with disabilities as human diversity and humanity" for protection of human rights of persons with disabilities.

== Ideology ==
Political ideologies can support or oppose diversity. For example, "Respect for Diversity" is one of the six principles of the Global Greens Charter. Other diversity preferences promote cultural assimilation or opposition to immigration. Diversity ideology can be categorized in egalitarian and essentialist.

== Types of diversity ==
=== Cultural diversity ===
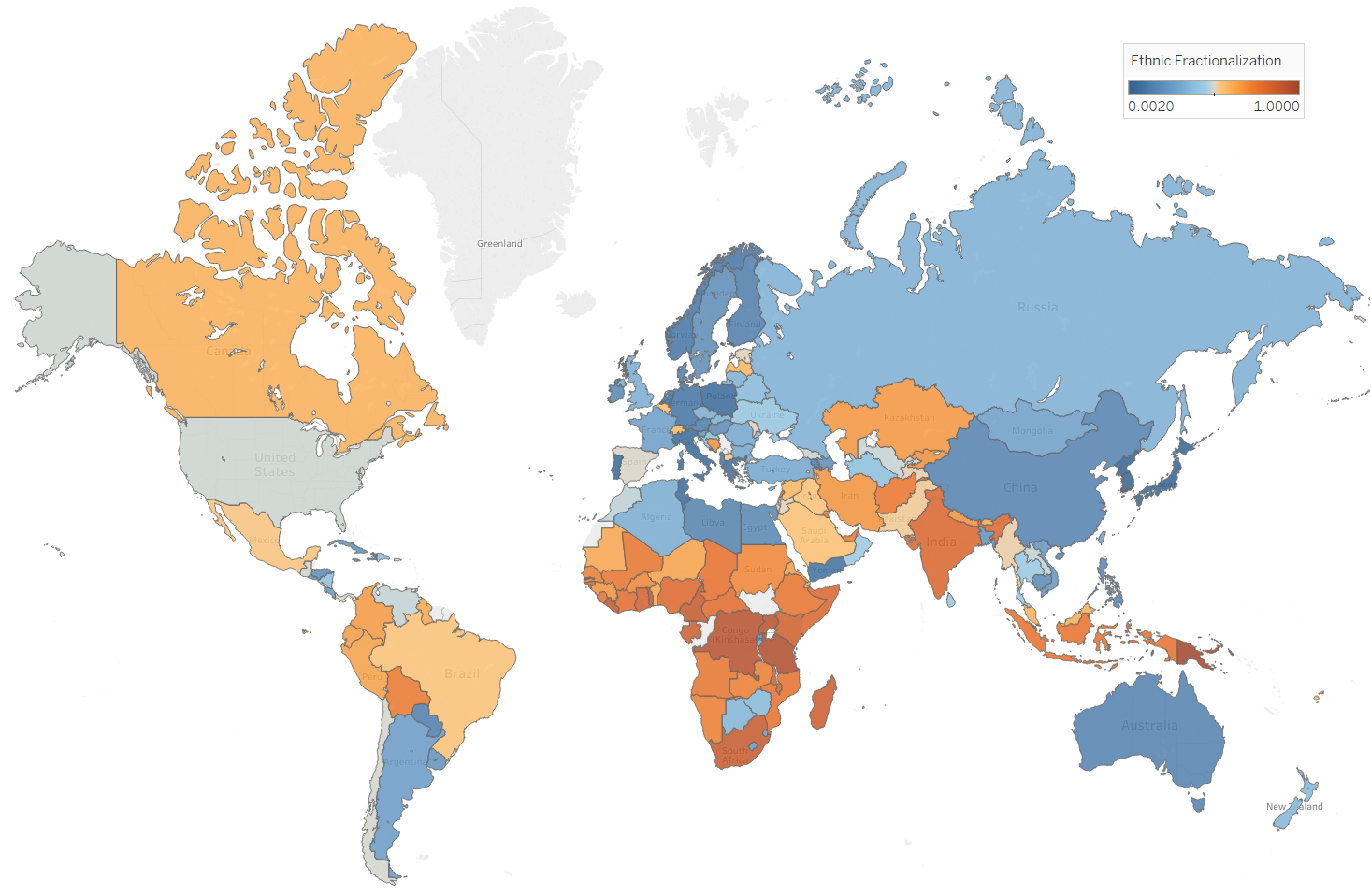
Global ethnic and cultural diversity; orange is higher.

Cultural diversity is the quality of diverse or different cultures, as opposed to monoculture. It has a variety of meanings in different contexts, sometimes applying to cultural products like art works in museums or entertainment available online, and sometimes applying to the variety of human cultures or traditions in a specific region, or in the world as a whole. It can also refer to the inclusion of different cultural perspectives in an organization or society.

=== Political diversity ===
Political diversity refers to value pluralism in a group. Political pluralism refers to the availability of a diverse number of organizational structures for channeling political participation in a society.

=== Functional diversity ===
Functional diversity is a politically and socially correct term for special needs, disability, impairment and handicap, which began to be used in Spain in scientific writing, at the initiative of those directly affected, in 2005.

=== Gender diversity ===
Gender diversity is equitable representation of people of different genders. It most commonly refers to an equitable ratio of men and women, but also includes people of non-binary genders. Gender diversity on corporate boards has been widely discussed, and many ongoing initiatives study and promote gender diversity in fields traditionally dominated by men, including computing, engineering, medicine, and science. It is argued that some proposed explanations are without merit and are in fact dangerous, while others do play a part in a complex interaction of factors. It is suggested that the very nature of science may contribute to the removal of women from the 'pipeline'.

=== Gerodiversity ===
Gerodiversity is the multicultural approach to issues of aging. This approach provides a theoretical foundation for the medical and psychological treatment of older adults within an ecological context that includes their cultural identity and heritage, social environment, community, family system, and significant relationships. Gerodiversity encompasses a social justice framework, which considers the social and historical dynamics of privilege and inequality. In addition to issues of aging, gerodiversity includes race, ethnicity, language, gender identity, socioeconomic status, physical ability or disability, sexual orientation, level of education, country of origin, location of residence, and religion or spirituality.

=== Sexual diversity ===
Sexual diversity or gender and sexual diversity (GSD), refers to all the diversities of sex characteristics, sexual orientations and gender identities, without the need to specify each of the identities, behaviors, or characteristics that form this plurality.

== Gender in politics ==
Historically, women have been underrepresented in politics compared to men. Women's rights movements, such as feminism, have addressed the marginalization of women in politics. Despite traditional doubts concerning female leadership, women have governed for at least a year in about one in four countries since 1960.

=== United Kingdom ===
Among the 61 Prime Ministers of the UK (Kingdom of Great Britain until 1801) there have been 3 women: Margaret Thatcher (1979–1990), Theresa May (2016–2019), and Liz Truss (2022).

=== United States ===
There has been an increase in women taking on leadership roles in both the public and private sectors of many countries, including the United States. However, there is still a "political gap" between men and women. Women are less likely than similarly situated men to consider running for office; less likely to run for office; less like to believe they are qualified to seek office; less likely to receive encouragement to run for office; and more likely to perceive a competitive, biased electoral environment.

==== White House Executive Offices ====
Administrations since Franklin D. Roosevelt's have placed aides and units charged with specific outreach to interests and constituencies in the "West Wing". However, specific positions and units devoted to women did not appear in the White House Offices until the late 1960s under John F. Kennedy's administration. Kennedy appointed Esther Peterson to be assistant secretary of labor and direct the department's Women's Bureau. Peterson worked to pass the Equal Pay Act of 1963 and was one of many to urge Kennedy to create the President's Commission on the Status of Women. After Kennedy's assassination, Johnson named her to an additional post for consumer affairs. Johnson's administration's efforts to boost the representation of women revolved around highlighting consumer issues.

President Richard Nixon did not appoint a woman assistant to the President's Task Force on Women's Rights and Responsibilities, Nixon appointed Anne Armstrong to the most senior WHO position: counselor to the president with cabinet rank. However, she was overwhelmed along with her small staff of two people and did not get to focus on representing women. Her work didn't particularly concern women's rights, however, scholars agree that she was an important step for the White House to have female representation in the offices, she “brought a new perspective to White House deliberations ensuring that names of women were included as candidates for vacant positions”. Armstrong was one of the first women to have direct access to the president as a White House staffer.

President Bill Clinton sought to build support among women more generally, especially following the 1990s healthcare debacle and the election of 1994, which the Democratic Party faced substantial losses. In 1995, the administration created the White House Office for Women's Initiatives and Outreach (OWIO). This was created to “better serve President Clinton’s constituents”. OWIO hosted many events and roundtable discussions and linked with many external organizations. The author states that these actions are symbolic representations. It was initially successful at connecting with women's groups and providing their findings to the President. However, in 1996, OWIO's activities substantially declined with the 1996 election and staff changes.

===== Mayors in the US =====
Local governments in the United States certainly have experienced an upsurge in female participation in politics. The graph depicts the increase in female participation in mayoral elections from 1950 to 2005 (see below). The graph utilizes a regression discontinuity design to mitigate the potential influence of city characteristics on the candidacy of women. The findings reveal that the gender of the mayor has no discernible effect on various policy outcomes, such as the scale of local government, the allocation of municipal resources, or crime rates. These conclusions hold true both in the short term and over extended periods. Despite this lack of policy divergence, female mayors exhibit heightened political efficacy, indicated by a notable increase in their incumbent advantage compared to male counterparts. Electing a female mayor didn't have a big impact on whether other women could win elections later on. Having a female mayor did not make it easier for other women to get elected as mayors or in local congressional races.

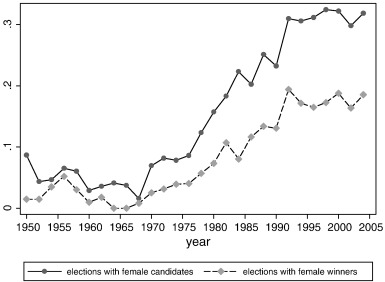
The proportion of elections with at least one female candidate and proportion of female wins

=== Latin America ===
Associations between women and integrity appear in Latin America where 32.6 percent of citizens in 2012 said that men are more corrupt as politicians while just 4 percent said women are more corrupt. Explanations for this “pro-women” stereotype relate to women's historical status as outsiders as well as their traditional identities as mothers.

Michelle Bachelet's 2006 election marked the beginning of a string of presidenta victories in Latin America. She set records for presidential popularity in Chile during her first term, and won reelection in one of the most lopsided contests in the country's history. However, a scandal (Caso Caval) erupted in February 2015, where her daughter-in-law and son, Sebastián Dávalos, were accused of tax fraud. Dávalos was the Social-Cultural Director, a position traditionally reserved for first ladies. He resigned ten days later.

Although Bachelet was never directly involved in the scandal, her approval ratings fell from 42 percent in the last quarter of 2014 to 36 percent in the first quarter of 2015 (the period immediately after Caso Caval erupted), 31 percent in the second quarter, and 27 percent in the third quarter. These numbers never fully bounced back, hitting 38 percent by February 2018.

== Race in politics ==
=== United Kingdom ===
Rishi Sunak (since 2022) was the first non-white Prime Minister of the UK.

=== United States ===
In American politics, white men have often been represented more compared to people of color. There has only been one black president, Barack Obama. All of the other 44 U.S. presidents have been white men. In other sections of U.S. politics, the number of people of color represented has gradually increased each year since the 20th century.

== Ethnicity in politics ==
=== Soviet Union ===
Korenizatsiia in 1920s and early 1930s Soviet Union promoted diversity by increasing the representation of non-Russian ethnic groups.

== See also ==
- Affirmative action
- Discrimination
- Diversity, equity, and inclusion
- Diversity training
- Ethnopluralism
- Heterodox Academy (viewpoint diversity in academy)
- Identity politics
- Individual and group rights
- Linguistic diversity index
- Multiculturalism
- Racial segregation
- Workplace diversity

== Sources ==
- Iwasaki, Michiko; Tazeau, Yvette N.; Kimmel, Douglas; Baker, Nancy Lynn; McCallum, T. J. (2009). "Gerodiversity and Social Justice: Voices of Minority Elders". In Chin, Jean Lau (ed.). Diversity in Mind and in Action. Bloomsbury. pp. 71–111. ISBN 978-0-313-34708-5.
