= British Society for Research on Ageing =

Scientific society

- Abbreviation: BSRA
- Formation: July 1939
- Founder: Vladimir Korenchevsky
- Legal status: Scientific society
- Purpose: Promotes research to understand the causes and effects of the ageing process
- Official language: English
- Chair: David Weinkove
- Website: bsra.org.uk

The British Society for Research on Ageing (BSRA) is a scientific society (registered charity no. 1174127) which promotes research to understand the causes and effects of the ageing process. The BSRA encourages publication and public understanding of ageing research and holds an annual scientific meeting. Many notable scientists with an interest in ageing are either past or current members of the organisation, which has exerted a marked influence on ageing research within the United Kingdom and internationally.

== Activities ==
=== Rationale ===
According to the earliest rules of the British Society for Research on Ageing (1954):

the society is instituted for the purpose of advancing knowledge of the causes and processes of ageing, by clinical and other observations on human beings, or by related experimental studies on living organisms.

However, in 1956 the Annual General Meeting of the society revised the rules such that:

the object of the Society shall be, through research, to increase knowledge of the processes and causes of ageing and, as indicated, of means for counteracting these both in human beings and in other organisms

Since 1979 the objectives of the society have been as follows:

1. through research, to increase knowledge of the processes, causes and effects of ageing, and, as indicated, of means for counteracting these, both in human beings and in other organisms
2. to publish the results of all such research
3. to further public education therein

Thus, the Society seeks to improve understanding of the fundamental biology of ageing, as well as to educate the public regarding the scientific developments taking place in the field of modern gerontology. More recently the society has begun to directly fund research into the biology of ageing, including funding of £54,750 to the end of a three-year PhD studentship at the University of Liverpool's Institute of Ageing and Chronic Disease

=== Scientific Meetings ===
The society currently organises at an annual scientific meeting and contributes to the activities of other organisations with similar goals on an ad hoc basic. Sample scientific meetings include:

- 50th Annual Scientific Meeting (2000) Stem cells, stress and senescence
- 51st Annual Scientific Meeting (2001) A Meeting of Minds (joint meeting between the BSRA and Research Into Ageing)
- 53rd Annual Scientific Meeting (2003) Nutrition and Healthy Ageing
- 54th Annual Scientific Meeting (2004) Ageing Cell, Ageing Body
- 55th Annual Scientific Meeting (2005) Is ageing skin deep?
- 58th Annual Scientific Meeting (2008) Ageing: Molecules to Man
- 59th Annual Scientific Meeting (2009) Engineering a Healthy Future
- 60th Annual Scientific Meeting (2010) Systems biology of ageing
- 61st Annual Scientific Meeting (2011) The science of ageing: Global Progress (joint with the International Association of Biomedical Gerontology)
- 62nd Annual Scientific Meeting (2012) Ageing: mechanisms and mitigants
- 63rd Annual Scientific Meeting (2013) New directions and Targets for Research on Ageing. Influences of diet, microbiota and intestinal immunity
- 64th Annual Scientific Meeting (2014) Exercise, Activity and Ageing Mechanism
- 66th Annual Scientific Meeting (2016) Evolution and the Biology of Ageing
- 67th Annual Scientific Meeting (2017) The Biology of Ageing and the Omics Revolution

=== Scientific journal ===
The official journal of the society is Biogerontology and members are urged to publish here whenever possible. Good relations also exist with the Chemistry Central Journal, which accepts work specifically relevant to the chemistry of ageing. In the past the society has maintained official journal status with Mechanisms of Ageing and Development and sponsored the creation of Age and Ageing jointly with the British Geriatrics Society. It no longer retains links with these latter journals.

=== Election to membership ===
Membership of the BSRA is open to those engaged in, directing, or interested in research to increase knowledge of the processes, causes and effects of ageing, both in human beings and in other organisms. Typical candidates for membership are either qualified to doctoral level in a relevant scientific subject or working towards such a qualification (e.g. a PhD student). However, the executive committee will assess each case on its merits and appropriate experiential or professional learning may be substituted.

A candidate for membership must be proposed and seconded by two existing members, but should an application be made in the absence of such sponsors the executive committee may choose to act in their place. This is intended to ensure that no worthy applicant is rejected due to a lack of prior contact with the disciplinary community.

=== Life membership ===
Life membership is both the oldest and highest honour that the British society for research on ageing can bestow. It dates back to the very beginnings of the Society and was first awarded to its founder, Vladimir Korenchevsky (1880–1959) shortly before his death. Prior to 2011, only a four such awards had been made in the history of the BSRA, the last of these in 1966 to the pioneering gerontologist Professor Fritz Verzar (1886–1979). To qualify as an honorary life member, a nominee must be approved by at least nine-tenths of BSRA members.

The original award of honorary life membership was accompanied by a gift (the sum of one guinea per member of the executive committee). To retain this tradition honorary life members today receive a special silver badge. Conceived by Richard Faragher and noted jewellery designer Clara Vichi, the badge incorporates a stylised shell motif and the initials of the British Society for Research on Ageing. Vichi has achieved widespread recognition for designs of this type, which draw inspiration from calligraphy and typography. The choice of a shell as the symbol of life membership combines insights from modern gerontology with the symbolism of medieval pilgrim badges. It is at once a reference to Arctica islandica (the longest-living non-colonial animal) and to the scallop shells worn by medieval pilgrims. To the original pilgrims the radial ridges on the shells they wore represented the different routes pilgrims travelled, eventually converging on their shared destination. Similarly, the membership of the BSRA study the biology of ageing in very different ways but share the common goal of creating a longer, healthier human lifespan.

=== Lord Cohen of Birkenhead medal ===
Established in 1979 and first awarded in 1980. The Lord Cohen Medal honours a person who in the view of the Medal Committee has made a considerable contribution to ageing research, either through original discoveries or in the promotion of the subject of gerontology in its broadest aspects. The recipient is invited to give a keynote lecture to the Society Nomination for the award can be made to the Committee by any member of the Society. The nominations must state the name, address and qualifications of the nominee, and should include sufficient information to allow the members of the Lord Cohen Medal Committee to assess the value of the contribution to ageing research. Current members of the executive committee are ineligible.

=== Korenchevsky award ===
The Korenchevsky Award is made to a society member who has made an original contribution to ageing research of sufficient significance for the society to sponsor wider dissemination of these findings among the scientific community. The award holder is chosen on a competitive basis from among the oral presentations made be society members at the scientific meeting (including joint meetings) of the society. The criteria for the award are the scientific significance of the work and the aptitude of delivery displayed by the candidate.

The recipient receives a cash prize (currently £1500) to be used to attend a suitable scientific meeting to present their work, promote the Objects of the Society and (in recognition of the tireless work of Korenchevsky in this arena) to facilitate international collaboration on ageing.

The current venue of choice is the Annual Meeting of the American Aging Association but the applicant may select another meeting subject to the host organisation giving proper recognition to the BSRA and prior ratification the executive committee.

== History ==
=== Foundation ===
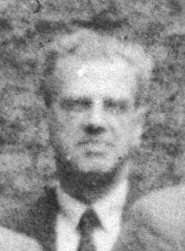
Korenchevsky, 1935

The British society for research on ageing began as the "Club for Research on Ageing" formed by Professor Vladimir Korenchevsky (1880–1959). Korenchevsky trained as a clinician in the Imperial Military Medical Academy at Petrograd and, after serving as head of a military laboratory during the Russo-Japanese war, undertook postgraduate work with both Ilya Ilyich Mechnikov (1908) and Ivan Petrovich Pavlov (1910–11). By 1915 he held the position of Professor of Experimental Pathology at the University of Petrograd. After the October Revolution in Russia he joined to the White Army in the Russian Civil War, where he was an assistant to the general Anton Denikin on sanitary issues. After the defeat of the White Army he emigrated to Britain in 1920. He conducted research at the Lister Institute for Preventative Medicine in London from that time until 1945. Upon his retirement he founded the Nuffield Unit for Gerontological Research in Oxford where he worked until 1953. His primary research interest during his working life was the synthesis and action of sex hormones, an interest shared by several prominent members of the club for ageing in its early days.

The precise date at which the "Club for Research on Ageing" was founded remains obscure but appears to predate Korenchevsky's visit to America in July 1939. It thus has a valid claim to be the oldest scientific society devoted to research into the biology of ageing in the world. It is certainly the one which achieved the most significant global results in terms of influence and dissemination.

Whilst in the USA he met with Vincent Cowdrey and a group of like-minded American researchers who had just completed the multi-author textbook "Problems of Ageing: Biological and Medical Aspects". On Korenchevsky’s recommendation approximately twenty of these researchers formed ‘‘the American Division’’ of the Club for Research on Ageing. The first meeting of the "American Branch" of the Club for Ageing took place in early 1940 (early club members included Ross Harrison, Robert A. Moore and Edward J. Stieglitz). Evidence both for the continuing activities of the "British branch" of the club for ageing and for its continued contact with the American division is evidenced in the extant correspondence of Walter Bradford Cannon (1871–1945) the distinguished Harvard physiologist and in that of the great British biologist Sir Ronald Aylmer Fisher FRS (1890–1962) . In February 1942, Fisher was supplied by Korenchevsky with both a research proposal authored by Edward Stieglitz (probably the same document mentioned by Canon in correspondence dating from 1941) and a report on the importance of research into the biology of ageing. He collaborated with Korenchevsky during the war years and appears to have been a member of the club at that time (he attended a "guiding group" meeting on 10 September 1943 and appears to have had voting rights). From Fisher’s correspondence it is also clear that Korenchevsky had interested Lord Nuffield in actively supporting gerontological research by 1942 The first formal conference of the "British Branch of the Club for Research on Ageing" was held at Imperial College, London on 16 July 1946 by which time, in addition to that in the USA, branches of the club had been established in Denmark, France, Sweden and Switzerland. In his address Korenchevsky told the conference:

the very great difficulty of the problem of ageing must be strongly emphasized. It is as difficult as, or perhaps more difficult than, the splitting of the atom, provided that the aim of gerontology is fully faced. This aim is not only a longer life but a stronger one-'to add life to years, not just years to life'

The resolution voted by the delegates at the conference of the British Branch of the Club for Research on Ageing is also extant and remains true today:

"For the rapid advance of gerontology and geriatrics the following conditions are desirable: (1) Co-operative research work of scientists and medical research workers in civilised countries. (2) Large funds for financing this research. (3) The establishment of experimental and clinical Institutes for Research on Ageing in major countries. (4) The formation of groups of research workers in gerontology and geriatrics. (5) Large long-term grants to existing scientific and medical laboratories and research hospitals who will agree to start gerontological or geriatrical research work."

=== Late 1940s–1960 ===
The chronology of the society between 1946 and 1954 is currently somewhat fragmentary. In 1945 the Research Club on Ageing (American division) became the Gerontological Society (of America) and in 1950, Korenchevsky and Cowdrey, together with Professor L. Brull, formed the International Association of Gerontology (now The International Association of Gerontology and Geriatrics) which held its first Congress in Liege, Belgium on 10–12 July 1950. In his report concerning the activities of the international Association of Gerontology given at its second Congress in Miami in 1952 Korenchevsky wrote:

"the whole organization of gerontological societies was devised and started in 1939 as an International Club for Research on Ageing. In 1950, for several good reasons, the club was superseded by the International Gerontological Association.". Contiguous internal minutes for the British Society for Research on Ageing (BSRA) are only currently available from June 1954 onwards. These were written at a time when the society was entering into a period of expansion but picture it (i) as active in the immediate past and (ii) active from a much earlier period (possibly pre-1939 since the Society is described as "instrumental in the establishment of gerontological societies in European and American countries"). The earliest extant List of Members and Rules of the Society available to the Society today dates from 1954 Based on internal document series and the number of members listed this was probably printed after October 1954 but before the close of the year (the executive committee meeting at which the new members were admitted taking place on 15 October). The combined List of Members and Rules of the Society is listed as the 3rd Edition which (assuming the annual or semi-annual printing that is normal practice for lists of society members) is consistent with a (now regrettably lost) 1st Edition probably printed 1950–1952.

This tallies closely with the chronology in Korenchevsky's BMJ article of 1952 as well as to his reference to an active executive committee for the BSRA in 1950 where it was funded by Lord Nuffield to participate in a round-table conference with the "American delegation to the First International Gerontological Congress". This took place on 8 July 1950 under Lord Nuffield's chairmanship (preceding the IAG meeting by two days). This appears to be one of the earliest extant uses of the term "British Society for Research on Ageing" as opposed to the "British Branch of the Club for Research on Ageing" and therefore represents a watershed date.

There are also references to the establishment of the Society in 1947 (e.g. Age and Ageing (1972) 1(1):2 and Korenchevsky's own correspondence to Cowdry). There is also a reference to the "Scottish Branch of the British Society for Research on Ageing" which Korenchevsky described in 1951 as "established and organised by Prof. Crew [Professor F.A.E Crew of Edinburgh University] in 1947 to stimulate and unite gerontologic and geriatric activities in Scotland".

Under the circumstances, the decision was taken in 2010 by the chair of the BSRA to set the official date of the 1st BSRA annual general meeting (as opposed to its foundation date) as 1950 for meeting numeration purposes. This corresponds to the foundation of the IAG and the ultimate cessation of the International Club for Research on Ageing. It is also consistent with Korenchevsky's statement of 1951 that the BSRA "has organised its own annual conferences". Thus, the 2010 annual scientific meeting of the British Society for Research on Ageing was the 60th annual general meeting.

During this period support for the society was forthcoming from the Nuffield Foundation (established in 1943).

Korenchevsky's report as Secretary(1 June 1954) to the society's four-man executive committee (chaired by Sir Charles Dodds FRS) showed that the BSRA had a notional 40 members paying an annual fee of 10s (equivalent to £12 in 2014) and assets of approximately £680 (equivalent to ~£15,800). By October 1954 this risen to 58, including possibly the BSRA's first foreign member (Professor J. Musso Fournier of Motevideo, Uruguay). A new Executive was elected for 1955 which included Professor Peter Medawar, who was to win a Nobel Prize shortly thereafter. The society restricted its interests to biological gerontology in contrast to both the IAG and the American geological Society. This was very much in accord with Korenchevsky's vision of how the organisation would operate and was to have significant consequences for the future development of the organisation.

The society's minutes during this period show a society dealing with the perennial problems in biological gerontology. These were (1) the limited number of scientists and clinicians interested in membership of "the only society engaged in research on basic problems of gerontology". (2) the question of whether or not to become practically involved in fundraising to conduct research into the biology of ageing. (3) how best to disseminate the scientific discoveries of members in the field of the biology of ageing and (4) how to work with societies with roughly cognate interests, either gerontological societies with broader disciplinary membership or with scientific societies (e.g. the nutrition Society) whose membership worked on problems directly relevant to the biology of ageing. How the executive committee chose to address these problems may be discerned from the summary below.

At this time, the BSRA did not hold a single scientific meeting which ran over several days (the standard format of many scientific conferences today). Instead, the preference was for short but frequent meetings held up to 4 times each year. In this respect, the society more closely resembled an organisation such as The Antibody Club which formed in 1960 (now part of the British society for immunology as the London immunology group, and which still organises seminars throughout the year) than many modern learned societies. The executive committee interspersed these short (in some cases only two hours) scientific meetings with co-ordinated activity with other interested organisations (e.g. with the Dutch gerontological Society, with the IAG and with open meetings at such as the one held on "The Biology of Hair Growth" held at the Royal College of Surgeons). Many routine secretarial functions were handled by the Institute of biology, of which the society remains a member today.

By 1958, the executive committee had decided that "the time was not right to launch public campaigns for funds". However, attempts to secure sustained funding for ageing research continued throughout the society's history.

The question of how best to disseminate the scientific findings of members was complicated by both the way in which the society operated and the variety of offers it received. As early as 1955, the organisation had considered sponsoring the European Journal of gerontology (probably analogous to the Journal of gerontology founded in 1946 shortly after the American branch of the club for ageing had become the GSA) but had decided not to do so. An invitation from Fritz Vezar and Karger that Gerontologica (now Gerontology) should become the official Journal of the BSRA was turned down in 1959, shortly after the Journal had been founded. The primary reason why neither formation of the society journal de novo or official linkage with a newly formed Journal was adopted seems to have been that the BSRA had formed a successful (and long lasting) linkage with the Ciba foundation. In early 1952 Prof RE Tunbridge (elected a member of the BSRA executive committee in 1954) had asked the Foundation if it was willing to hold a related conference on ageing close to the time of the third Congress of the IAG (July 1954). Not only did the Director of the foundation agree to this, but the Trustees took the decision in early 1954 "to embark on special measures in support, internationally, of basic research relevant to the problems of ageing so that the conference already arranged became the first in what it is to be hoped will be a series of conferences on subjects in this field". The Foundation launched a published series called "Colloquia on Ageing". The first of these (published 1955 on general aspects of ageing) was chaired by Prof Tunbridge and included contributions (either as speakers or discussants) from many prominent members of the BSRA including Medawar, Comfort, Olbers, and Krohn. Prominent international scientists with connections to the BSRA and the IAGB also attended (e.g. Cowdry, Vezar and Brull)as did American researchers connected to the GSA such as Nathan Shock and McCay.

Ciba meetings had a distinct style in which "leading research workers from different countries and different disciplines are invited to attend the colloquia. The size of the group is, however, very strictly limited in order to obtain a free conversational manner of discussion". Close linkage with Ciba was thus a sensible decision for the executive committee because it both suited the style of meeting which the small membership of the BSRA preferred and provided a route for authoritative dissemination since "the smallness of the groups [at the meeting] means the exclusion of many workers active and interested in the subjects discussed and therefore the proceedings of these conferences are published and made available throughout the world". However, the disadvantage of this approach was that it was unsuited to the regular dissemination of peer-reviewed research that is so necessary today.

Although the colloquia series proper seem to have been discontinued after five years from 1955 to 1970 the executive committee of the society met at the Ciba Foundation (41 Portland Place, London). Since the foundation headquarters also provided a library and guest facilities for visiting scientists this was to prove a remarkably durable and successful arrangement.

=== 1960s and 1970s ===
Scientific meetings were regularly organised there and an annual Ciba lecture on ageing delivered at various locations throughout the UK until 1970 (the last probably by Leonard Hayflick). The society also undertook joint meetings with other organisations which had shared goals (e.g. with the Society for Experimental Biology in 1967) and its activities were always conducted with a view to harmonising them with the meetings of the IAG (which took place in Denmark, the USA, the USSR, Israel and Japan over this period) . The disengagement of Ciba from support for ageing research in the early 1970s led to a number of distinct meeting venues being used by the executive committee (including the Royal College of Pathologists, St Pancras Hospital and the Leeds General infirmary).

A particularly important point during this period was Age Action Year. This was a concerted campaign to raise awareness of both the problems faced by older people and the potential of research into the mechanisms of ageing to alleviate them. As Hugh Faulkner, founder of Help the Aged, put it in a 1976 editorial:

Age Action Year will also see the provision of a foundation for co-ordinated research into ageing itself. This opens up exciting possibilities for everyone, because if we are to make old age a time of interest and healthy activity we have to know how to make people fit into later years, how to make the best use of available resources and how to gear our living throughout our lives so that we know how to make the best of our own 'bonus years'.

Britain badly needs this foundation, because although we are ahead of so many countries in the field of geriatric medicine, we do lag behind in not having a foundation to co-ordinate and direct various fields of research.

The research envisaged will tackle memory loss and senile dementia, which affects 27 per cent of those over 85; it will tackle incontinence, which is both distressing and humiliating; diabetes, which is the cause of many heart attacks and strokes; retirement, with its problems and opportunities, and other social matters.

The foundation will mean that every one of us can look to a more hopeful future. This new foundation which has such potential will require a lot of money, and it was this which prompted Sir Lindsay Ring (Lord Mayor of London till last month) to make Age Action Year his special appeal and put into it all his energy and enthusiasm.

This was infectious, and the money has been coming in: first from individuals whose contributions are still required, then from companies and trusts, and recently a significant move has come from the trade union movement. Jack Jones challenged members of his own union and others to donate one penny a week from their wages.

People in Britain have become more aware than ever before of the needs of the elderly. They have also seen that these needs can be met on the two fronts pioneered by Age Action Year. First, at the local level, so much can be done for the elderly among us. Secondly, at the research level: and we can all contribute to the setting up of the new foundation.

The BSRA had worked exceptionally hard to promote the Foundation which was originally known as the British Foundation for Ageing Research (or BFAR) but which was to become the respected charity Research Into Ageing. This name change was initiated in 1988.

=== 1980s and 1990s ===
The BSRA obtained charitable status (1980) which it retains to this day. There was a marked upswing in the activity and membership of the society from the mid-1990s onwards as a result of importance of research into the biology of ageing given in both the Office of Science and Technology (OST) Extend Quality Life (or EQUAL) initiative (1995) which sought to use "the combined resources, expertise and capacity for innovation of the science and engineering base to extend the active period of people's lives and in the subsequent Technology Foresight review"

=== Millennium to the present ===
To mark the 60th annual meeting of the BSRA, the membership voted to bestow honorary life membership on all Cohen Medallists then still living. This award took place as a special round table at the 61st annual meeting.
