= Sarah Lamb =

Sarah Lamb may refer to:

- Sarah Lamb (dancer) (born 1980), American principal ballet dancer with The Royal Ballet
- Sarah Lamb (anthropologist) (born 1960), American cultural anthropologist
- Sallie Lamb (Sarah Elizabeth Lamb), British medical researcher

== See also ==
- Sarah Lam, British-Chinese actress
