= Lynne Cox (scientist) =

British biochemist

Lynne Cox FRSB is a British biochemist who researches the molecular basis of human ageing at the University of Oxford. She is the George Moody fellow and tutor in biochemistry at Oriel College, Oxford and principal investigator of the Ageing and Cell Senescence lab within Oxford's biochemistry department. She has been a fellow of Oriel College since 1996.

Beyond her work at Oxford, Cox sits on the strategic advisory board of the all-party parliamentary group for longevity and co-authored a national strategy report on the health of the nation. She also co-founded the Oxford Ageing Network with Katja Simon.

In 2023, Cox began leading the $60-million Dynamic Resilience programme, jointly funded by Wellcome Leap and Temasek Trust, as program director. The programme is intended to research how human life spans might be extended.

In 2014, Cox was presented with the Glenn Foundation award for research into the biological mechanisms of ageing at the House of Lords. In 2023 she was awarded the Lord Cohen Medal for her contribution to ageing research. In 2025 the University of Oxford conferred the Title of Distinction of Professor of Geroscience on her. She is a fellow of the Royal Society of Biology.
