= Vladimir Korenchevsky =

Russian-British gerontologist

- Владимир Георгиевич Коренчевский
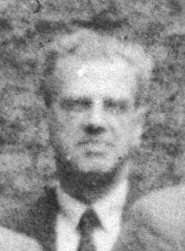
- Korenchevsky in 1935
- Born: January 15, 1880; Ashmyany, Vilna Governorate, Russian Empire
- Died: July 9, 1959 (aged 79); London, United Kingdom
- Known for: founder of the British Society for Research on Ageing, co-founder of the International Association of Gerontology and Geriatrics
- Scientific career
- Fields: pathology, gerontology, pharmacology, bacteriology

Vladimir Korenchevsky (Russian: Владимир Георгиевич Коренчевский) was a Russian-British pathologist, gerontologist, pharmacologist, and bacteriologist.

== Biography ==
Vladimir Korenchevsky was born on 15 January 1880 in the town Ashmyany, Vilna Governorate, Russian Empire. (Note: At present, most of the Vilna Governorate, including the town Ashmyany, is on the territory of Belarus. The rest, including the provincial capital Vilna (now Vilnius), is part of Lithuania.) (Note: There are statements that Korenchevsky could be born in the town Lida of the same Vilna Governorate, or in Saint Petersburg. But sources of this information look much weaker than sources saying about town Ashmyany.) In 1898 Korenchevsky graduated from school in Riga with the silver medal, and in 1903 he graduated from the Imperial Military Medical Academy with honors. He was a doctor in a military field hospital during the Russo-Japanese War (1904–05). After war he participated in the elimination of plague outbreaks in Mongolia. Then he worked in the medical faculty of the Imperial Moscow University where he became interested in gerontology. In 1908, he trained in the laboratory of Élie Metchnikoff in the Pasteur Institute in Paris. In 1910, at the invitation of Ivan Pavlov, he worked in the Institute of Experimental Medicine.

In 1919 Korenchevsky moved to Sevastopol where he worked at the Sevastopol Biological Station. During Russian Civil War he joined the White Army, where he was an assistant to the general Anton Denikin on sanitary issues. At that time Korenchevsky taught at the medical faculty of the newly formed Taurida University.

In 1920, after the loss of the White Army in the Civil War, Korenchevsky and his family was evacuated from Novorossiysk to Thessaloniki, Greece, from where he moved to Vlasotince and Vranjska Banja of the Kingdom of Serbs, Croats and Slovenes. And after short time Korenchevsky moved to the United Kingdom.

From 1920 to 1945 Korenchevsky worked at the Lister Institute of Preventive Medicine where he prepared more than a hundred science papers that were published in the journals of the United Kingdom and USA.

In 1939 Vladimir Korenchevsky founded the "British Club for Research on Ageing" that in 1946 was renamed to the British Society for Research on Ageing. In 1945 he created gerontology laboratory at the University of Oxford. Largely due to his active efforts in July 1950 the International Association of Gerontological Societies was formed that later was renamed to the International Association of Gerontology and Geriatrics (IAGG).

Some people called Vladimir Korenchevsky a "father of gerontology", although in the science such things is often ambiguous and the same title is also applied to Élie Metchnikoff and some other people who were active in the field of aging research already after Korenchevsky.

== See also ==
- Timeline of senescence research
