= Jackie Taylor (physician) =

Scottish physician and academic

Jacqueline Taylor MBE FRCP
- Education: University of Glasgow Medical School
- Medical career
- Institutions: University of Glasgow

Jacqueline Taylor is a Scottish physician and Professor at the University of Glasgow. She is the former President of the Royal College of Physicians and Surgeons of Glasgow and the Cardiovascular Section of the British Geriatrics Society. She was elected a Member of the British Empire in the 2023 New Year Honours.

== Early life and education ==
Taylor studied medicine at the University of Glasgow Medical School. She specialised in heart failure.

== Research and career ==
Taylor was made a consultant for medicine at the Glasgow Royal Infirmary in 1997. She specialised in medicine for the elderly. Here she developed the stroke service and heart failure clinic. In 2018 Taylor was elected President of the Royal College of Physicians and Surgeons of Glasgow, and led the college throughout the COVID-19 pandemic. She was the first woman to hold such a position, and emphasised the need for hospitals to listen to consultant advice to optimise patient care. Even prior to the pandemic, Taylor explained that doctors were struggling under considerable pressures at work. She formed a partnership with the Ministry of Higher Education and Scientific Research in the Arab Republic of Egypt to enhance medical and dental care in Egypt. The RCPSG instituted its highest award (Taylor Medal) in her honour in 2025 to mark the college's 425-year anniversary.

After 38 years of service, Taylor retired from the National Health Service in 2021. She was made Chair of the Scottish Government National Audiology Review in 2022. In this capacity she looked to improve audiology services across Scotland.

== Awards and honours ==
- 2021 Honorary doctorate from the Glasgow Caledonian University
- 2023 Member of the British Empire

== Select publications ==
- John Cleland; Michal Tendera; Jerzy Adamus; Nick Freemantle; Lech Polonski; Jacqueline Taylor; PEP-CHF Investigators (8 September 2006). "The perindopril in elderly people with chronic heart failure (PEP-CHF) study". European Heart Journal. 27 (19): 2338–2345. doi:10.1093/eurheartj/ehl250. ISSN 0195-668X. PMID 16963472. Wikidata Q61716699.
- Paul R Burton; David G Clayton; Lon R Cardon; et al. (November 2007). "Association scan of 14,500 nonsynonymous SNPs in four diseases identifies autoimmunity variants". Nature Genetics. 39 (11): 1329–37. doi:10.1038/ng.2007.17. ISSN 1061-4036. PMC 2680141. PMID 17952073. Wikidata Q24646663.
- Aleem U Khand; Andrew C Rankin; William Martin; Jacqueline Taylor; Islay Gemmell; John Cleland (1 December 2003). "Carvedilol alone or in combination with digoxin for the management of atrial fibrillation in patients with heart failure?". Journal of the American College of Cardiology. 42 (11): 1944–1951. doi:10.1016/j.jacc.2003.07.020. ISSN 0735-1097. PMID 14662257. Wikidata Q44684620.
