= Henry Cohen, 1st Baron Cohen of Birkenhead =

British physician, doctor and lecturer (1900–1977)

The Right Honourable The Lord Cohen of Birkenhead CH FRCP
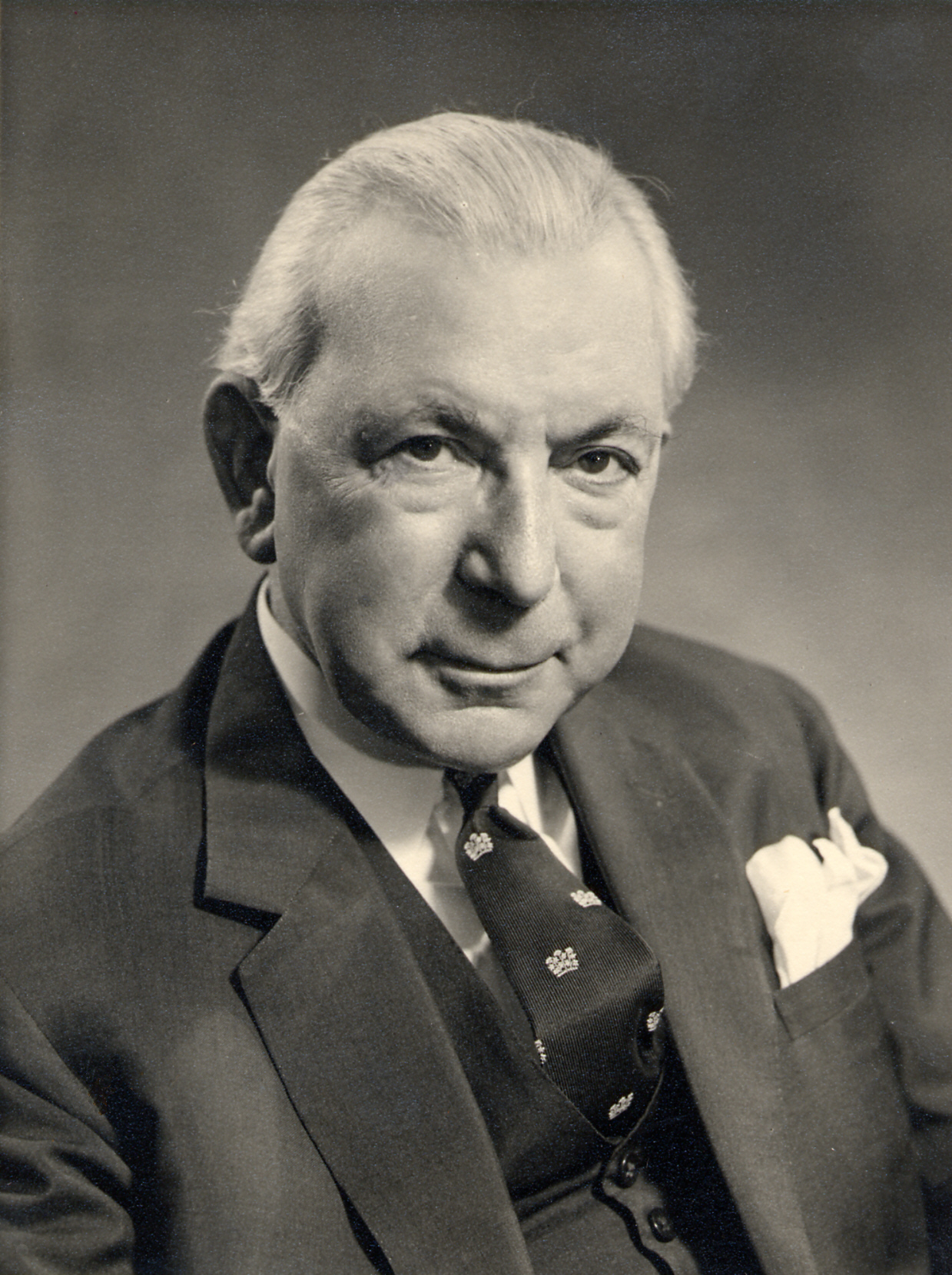
- Born: 21 February 1900
- Died: 7 August 1977 (aged 77)
- Education: University of Liverpool
- Known for: President of the British Medical Association (1951), President of the General Medical Council (1961), President of the Royal Society of Medicine (1971)

Henry Cohen, 1st Baron Cohen of Birkenhead CH FRCP (21 February 1900 – 7 August 1977) was a British physician, doctor and lecturer. He was famous for his Harveian Oration at the Royal College of Physicians in 1970, on the motion of blood in the veins. Cohen was elected to the chair of medicine at the University of Liverpool in 1934. When the Central Health Services Council was formed in 1949, he became its vice-chairman, and chairman in 1957. Knighted in 1949, he was President of the British Medical Association from 1951. After a coronary thrombosis in the following year, Cohen decided to devote his life to the greater work of teaching. He was raised to the peerage as Baron Cohen of Birkenhead, of Birkenhead in the County Palatine of Chester, on 16 June 1956 and was elected President of the General Medical Council in 1961. In 1964, he became President of the Royal Society of Medicine, receiving the society's gold medal in 1971. He also opened the assembly hall of the King David School, Liverpool.

== Background ==
Henry Cohen was born in Birkenhead on 21 February 1900. One of his teachers at the church school described him as showing 'signs of genius when most boys are only beginning to show signs of intelligence'. He attended the Birkenhead Institute on a scholarship, and captained its cricket and rugby teams.

Cohen won a scholarship to the University of Oxford, but for reasons of expense attended the University of Liverpool. He graduated MB ChB in 1922 with first class honours and distinction in all his courses. He studied at the University of London and University of Paris, obtaining his MD with special merit in 1924. In 1924 he became assistant physician at the Liverpool Royal Infirmary, where he was to remain on the staff for 41 years.

== Honours and Distinctions ==
Cohen was appointed to the chair of medicine at Liverpool in 1934, a part-time position, enabling him to follow up the results of his teaching by keeping in contact with local colleagues and practitioners. Between 1947 and 1971 he served as a member of the board of governors of the Liverpool teaching hospitals and of the regional hospital board.

In 1954 Cohen was elected president of the Liverpool Medical Institution. Cohen was elected president of the Royal Society of Health in 1958, where he served four 5-year terms. He was invested as an associate Knight of the Order of St John in 1961, the same year he was elected president of the General Medical Council.

In 1963 he received the honorary FRCPS Glasgow, the honorary FFARCS and the honorary LLD London. In December he retired from the chairmanship of the Central Health Services Council and of the Standing Medical Advisory Committee of the Ministry of Health. In March 1964 he was elected to honorary fellowship of the Royal College of Obstetricians and Gynaecologists. He retired from the chair of medicine at Liverpool in 1965.

In July 1966 he received the honorary doctorates from the universities of Hull and Sussex. He won the Gold Medal of the BMA in 1967 in recognition of his outstanding services to the Association and to the medical profession. The honorary degree of Doctor of Civil Law was conferred on him by University of Oxford in 1968, the following year he was elected an honorary fellow of the Royal College of Surgeons and in 1970 he was elected Chancellor of Hull University. He was appointed Member of the Order of the Companions of Honour in 1974.

== Lord Cohen Medal ==
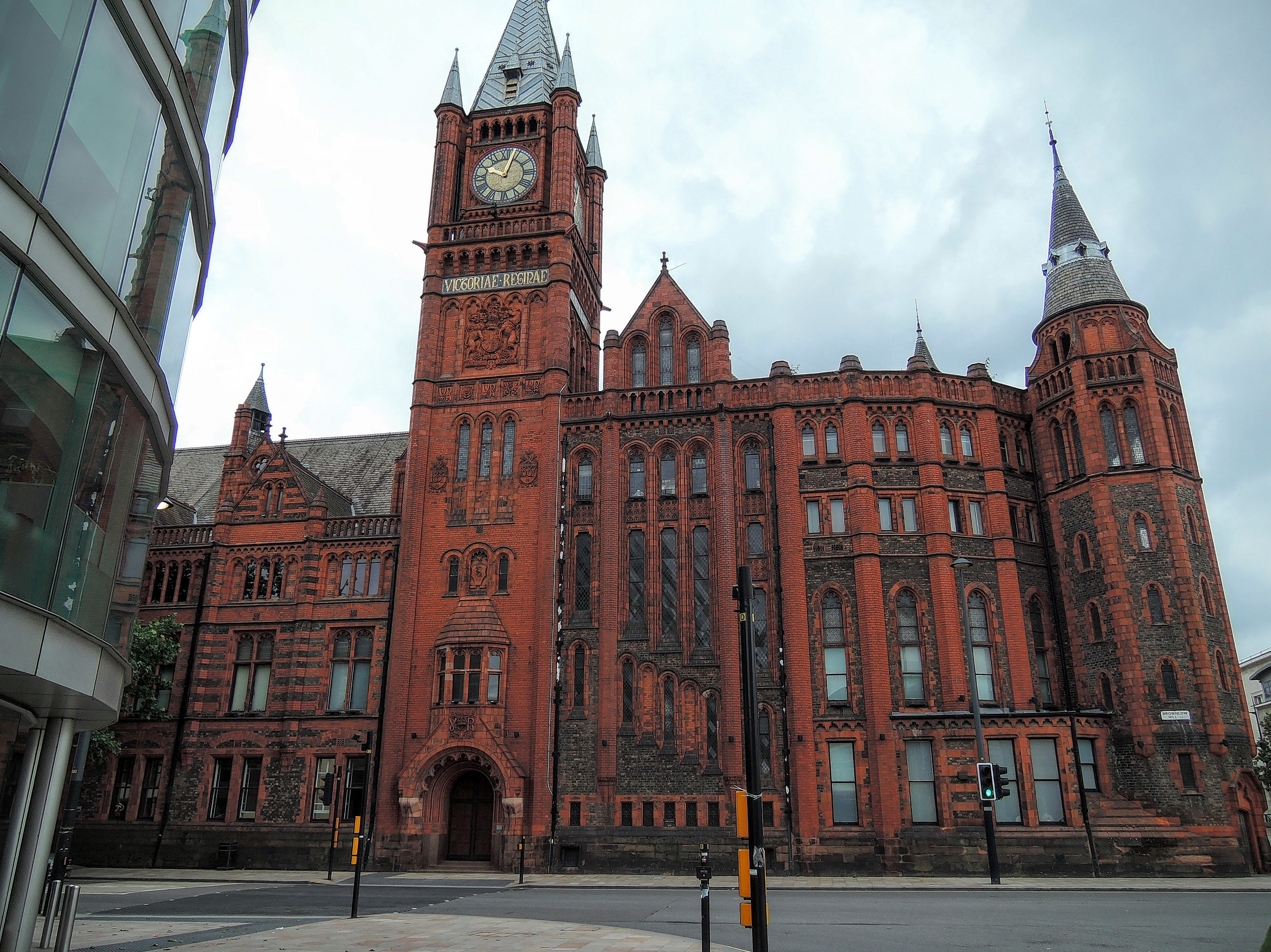
Cohen was made Chair of the School of Medicine at the University of Liverpool in 1934.

Lord Cohen Medal, named after him, is awarded to individuals who "have made a considerable contribution to ageing research, either through original discoveries or in the promotion of the subject of gerontology in its broadest aspect." It is the highest award for services to gerontology in the United Kingdom and is awarded on a sporadic basis by the British Society for Research on Ageing.

Lord Cohen of Birkenhead died on 7 August 1977, aged 77, after a short illness, at Bath, Somerset when the peerage became extinct. Cohen has a lecture theatre named after him in the Duncan Building belonging to the University of Liverpool.

Cohen was known for his quote "The feasibility of an operation is not the best indication for its performance".
