= Robin Holliday =

British molecular biologist (1932–2014)

- Born: 6 November 1932
- Died: 9 April 2014 (aged 81)
- Education: Cambridge University (BA, PhD)
- Occupation: Molecular biologist
- Known for: Holliday junction

Robin Holliday FRS FAA (6 November 1932 – 9 April 2014) was a British molecular biologist. Holliday described a mechanism of DNA-strand exchange that attempted to explain gene-conversion events that occur during meiosis in fungi. That model was first proposed in 1964 and is now known as the Holliday junction.

== Education and employment ==
Holliday held a B.A. in Natural Sciences and a PhD in genetics from Cambridge University. He was a Fellow of the Royal Society, a Fellow Australian Academy of Science (FAA), a member of the European Molecular Biology Organization, a Foreign Fellow of the Indian National Science Academy, and held the 1987 Lord Cohen Medal for Gerontological research. He was formerly the Head of the Genetics Division, National Institute for Medical Research, (Medical Research Council), Mill Hill, London, UK, and prior to his death was a retired Chief Research Scientist, CSIRO Division of BioMolecular Engineering, Sydney, Australia.

== Epigenetic research ==
In 1975 he suggested that DNA methylation could be an important mechanism for the control of gene expression in higher organisms, and this has now become documented as a basic epigenetic mechanism in normal and also cancer cells. In 1988 he moved to a Commonwealth Scientific and Industrial Research Organisation CSIRO laboratory in Sydney, Australia, where he continued to study ageing, and his book Understanding Ageing was published in 1995. He was a biogerontologist and mentored several successful biogerontologists, including Suresh Rattan, editor-in-chief of the journal Biogerontology. The main focus of his experimental work was the epigenetic control of gene expression by DNA methylation in CHO cells. These experiments provide direct evidence that DNA methylation is a primary cause of gene silencing in mammalian cells.

== Publications ==
Holliday was the author of numerous books, including;

- The Science of Human Progress, Oxford University Press, Oxford, 1981;
- Genes, Proteins and Cellular Aging, Van Nostrand Reinhold, New York, 1986
- Understanding Aging, Cambridge University Press, Cambridge England, 1995
- Slaves and Saviours, Blackwall Books, Sydney, 2000
- Aging: The Paradox of Life: Why We Age, Springer, Dordrecht, 2007
- Origins & Outcomes: An Autobiography, Longueville, Sydney, 2008.

Selected historical survey articles in scientific journals by Holliday:

- A different kind of inheritance. Scientific American, 260, 60–73 (1989).
- The history of the DNA heteroduplex. BioEssays, 12, 133–142 (1990).
- Twenty years of ageing research at the Mill Hill laboratories. Experimental Gerontology 37, 851–857 (2002)
- Early studies on recombination and DNA repair in Ustilago maydis. DNA Repair, 3, 671–682 (2004)
- Epigenetics: a historical overview. Epigenetics, 1, 76–80 (2006).

Selected edited publications and proceedings:

- Genes, Proteins and Cellular Ageing (Benchmark Papers in Genetics). Holliday, R (editor). van Nostrand Reinhold, New York (1986).
  Selected facsimile reprints of 30 scientific papers by various authors, with an Introduction, Comments and Epilogue by the editor.
- Towards Prolongation of the Healthy Lifespan. Holliday, R., D. Harman, and M. Meydani (eds). Annals N.Y. Acad. Sci. 854 (1998).
  Proceedings of the 7th Congress of the International Association of Biomedical Gerontology, Adelaide, Australia (1997).
- Evolution of Adaptation by Natural Selection. Holliday, R., J. Maynard Smith (eds). The Royal Society, London (1979).
  Proceedings of a Discussion Meeting of the Royal Society, London, organised by the Editors, in December 1978.
- DNA Methylation and Gene Regulation. Holliday, R., M. Monk and J.E. Pugh (eds). The Royal Society, London (1990).
  Proceedings of a Discussion Meeting of the Royal Society, London, organised by the Editors, in February 1989
- Ageing: Science, Medicine and Society. Phil. Trans. Roy. Soc B, 352, 1761–1920 (1997). Holliday, R., J. Grimley Evans, T.B.L. Kirkwood, P. Laslett, and L. Tyler (eds).
  Proceedings of a Discussion Meeting of the Royal Society, London, organised by the Editors, in May 1997.
