= Janet Mary Lord =

British biologist and academic

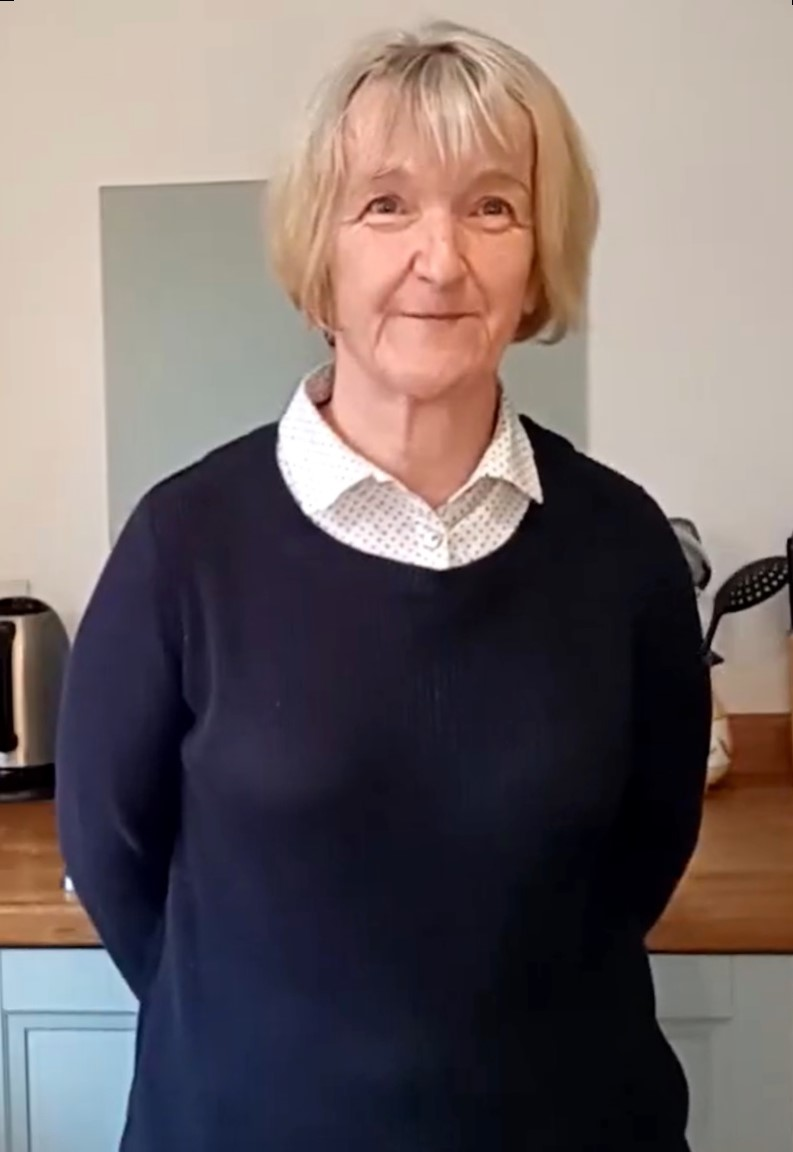
- Lord in 2020
- Education: Oxford Brookes University; Aston University
- Scientific career
- Workplaces: University of Birmingham; University of Oxford
- Thesis: The effect of oral-hypoglycaemic drugs and obesity on insulin receptor binding (1983)

Janet Mary Lord CBE FMedSci is a British biologist who is a Professor of Immune Cell Biology at the University of Birmingham. Her research considers immunity in old age, with a focus on the decline of neutrophil function. She was made a Commander of the British Empire in the 2023 New Year Honours List.

== Early life and education ==
Lord studied Human Biology at Oxford Brookes University, then moved to Aston University for her doctoral research, where she studied the impact of hypoglycaemic drugs and obesity on insulin receptor binding. She joined the University of Oxford as a research fellow.

== Research and career ==
Lord researches the effect of ageing on immune function, and how this impacts the ability of older people to resolve inflammation. Her research has shown that exercise helps to slow the ageing process. She showed that older adults have neutrophils which aren't as effective (lower phagocytosis, chemotaxis and NET generation) and have high levels of cortisol. Elevated levels of cortisol have a negative impact on ageing, including increasing muscle and bone loss and raising blood pressure. Lord showed that defects in neutrophil chemotaxis can also be corrected by statins. Lord joined the University of Birmingham early in her career, first as a Royal Society University Research Fellow and then professor in 2004.

Lord is Director of the Medical Research Council Versus Arthritis Centre for musculoskeletal ageing research. The centre is located in the Queen Elizabeth Hospital Birmingham. She was a member of the Academy of Medical Sciences Healthy Ageing Forum, a group which looked to understand ageing research and priorities the most effective intervention.

Lord is part of the CARINA (CAtalyst Reducing ImmuNe Ageing) Network. The network looks to understand the immune system throughout human life.

== Awards and honours ==
- 2013 British Society for Research into Ageing Lord Cohen Medal
- 2015 Elected Fellow of the Academy of Medical Sciences
- 2022 Elected to the Order of the British Empire

== Selected publications ==
- Cross TG; Scheel-Toellner D; Henriquez NV; Deacon E; Salmon M; Janet M. Lord (1 April 2000). "Serine/threonine protein kinases and apoptosis". Experimental Cell Research. 256 (1): 34–41. doi:10.1006/excr.2000.4836. ISSN 0014-4827. PMID 10739649. Wikidata Q33876765.
- Albert C Shaw; Samit Joshi; Hannah Greenwood; Alexander Panda; Janet M Lord (1 August 2010). "Aging of the innate immune system". Current Opinion in Immunology. 22 (4): 507–513. doi:10.1016/j.coi.2010.05.003. ISSN 0952-7915. PMC 4034446. PMID 20667703. Wikidata Q33666891.
- Buckley CD; Darrell Pilling; Janet M. Lord; Akbar AN; Scheel-Toellner D; Salmon M (1 April 2001). "Fibroblasts regulate the switch from acute resolving to chronic persistent inflammation". Trends in Immunology. 22 (4): 199–204. doi:10.1016/s1471-4906(01)01863-4. ISSN 1471-4906. PMID 11274925. Wikidata Q34198891.
