= Age and Ageing =

- Discipline: Geriatric medicine
- Language: English
- Edited by: Roy Soiza

Publication details
- History: 1972-present
- Publisher: Oxford University Press
- Frequency: Bimonthly
- Impact factor: 10.668 (2020)

Standard abbreviations
- ISO 4: Age Ageing

Indexing
- ISSN: 0002-0729 (print); 1468-2834 (web)

Links
- Journal homepage; Online access; Online archive

Age and Ageing is a bimonthly peer-reviewed medical journal covering all aspects of geriatric medicine and gerontology. It was established in 1972 and is published by Oxford University Press. It is the official journal of the British Geriatrics Society and the editor-in-chief is Roy Soiza (University of Aberdeen).

== Abstracting and indexing ==
The journal is abstracted and indexed in CINAHL, EMBASE, Science Citation Index, Scopus, and MEDLINE/PubMed. According to the Journal Citation Reports, the journal has a 2020 impact factor of 10.668.

== Editors-in-chief ==
The following persons have been editor-in-chief of the journal:

- A. N. Exton-Smith and H. M. Hodkinson (1972–1985)
- H. M. Hodkinson (1986–1987)
- J. Grimley Evans (1988–1995)
- G. P. Mulley (1996–2001)
- G. K. Wilcock (2002–2007)
- R. M. Francis (2007–2014)
- David J. Stott (2014-2019
- Rowan Harwood (2019–2024)
- Roy Soiza (2024-Present)
