= Forrest Scogin =

American psychologist

Forrest Scogin is a professor of clinical psychology at the University of Alabama. His primary interests have been in geropsychology (the psychology of the elderly) and he has conducted extensive research in this area.

In 2008, Scogin was awarded the M. Powell Lawton Distinguished Contribution Award for Applied Gerontology by the American Psychological Association.

Dr. Forrest Scogin is the recipient of the 2014 M. Powell Lawton Award for Distinguished Contributions to Clinical Geropsychology. The award is presented by the APA Society of Clinical Gereopsychology.

Scogin founded a program with the University of Alabama to provide psychological treatment for adults aged 60 and older, while also conducting research on the effectiveness of various treatments. The program was relatively new in 1993; it offered individual and group counseling at a low cost, with adjustments available based on income.
