= John Grimley Evans =

British gerontologist

John Grimley Evans FMedSci FRCP
- Born: 17 September 1936; Birmingham, England, UK
- Died: 26 March 2018 (aged 81)
- Education: King Edward's School, Birmingham; University of Cambridge (MA, MD); University of Oxford (DM)
- Awards: Knight Bachelor (1997)
- Scientific career
- Fields: Gerontology
- Workplaces: London School of Hygiene and Tropical Medicine; Newcastle University; University of Oxford
- Doctoral students: Sallie Lamb

Sir John Grimley Evans (17 September 1936 – 26 March 2018) was a British gerontologist.

== Early life and education ==
Grimley Evans was born in Birmingham to Harry Walter Grimley Evans and Violet Prenter Walker on 17 September 1936. He attended King Edward's School, Birmingham, and studied at St John's College, Cambridge and Balliol College, Oxford.

== Career ==
Grimley Evans worked with Donald Acheson before joining the London School of Hygiene and Tropical Medicine as a lecturer. Subsequently, he taught at Newcastle University and the University of Oxford. Grimley Evans served as editor of the journal Age and Ageing from 1988 to 1995.

=== Awards and honours ===
Grimley Evans was elected a Fellow of the Academy of Medical Sciences (FMedSci) in 1998 and was knighted in the 1997 Birthday Honours.

== Personal life ==
Grimley Evans died at the age of 81 on 26 March 2018.
