= Lord Cohen Medal =

British medical award

The Lord Cohen Medal is a British medical award honouring individuals who "have made a considerable contribution to ageing research, either through original discoveries or in the promotion of the subject of gerontology in its broadest aspect". It is the highest award for services to gerontology in the United Kingdom and is named after British physician Henry Cohen.

The medal is awarded by the British Society for Research on Ageing on a sporadic basis.

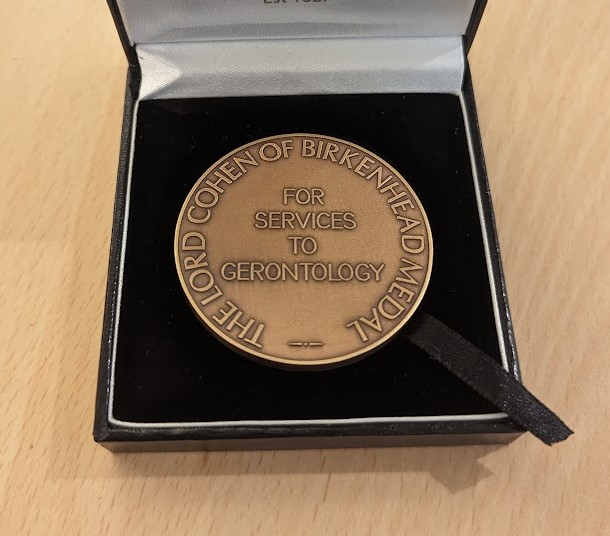
Front of the Lord Cohen Medal

== Recipients ==
- 2024 Cynthia Kenyon, Calico (company)
- 2023 Lynne Cox (scientist), University of Oxford
- 2017 Thomas von Zglinicki, Newcastle University
- 2016 Richard Faragher, University of Brighton
- 2015 Richard Aspinall, Coventry University
- 2014 Malcolm Jackson, University of Liverpool
- 2013 Janet Mary Lord, University of Birmingham
- 2011 Suresh I. S. Rattan, Aarhus University, Denmark
- 2008 Arlan G. Richardson, Barshop Institute, University of Texas
- 2007 Raymond Tallis, University of Manchester
- 2006 Tom Kirkwood, Newcastle University
- 2004 Linda Partridge, University College, London
- 1999 Leonard Hayflick, University of California, San Francisco
- 1987 Robin Holliday, National Institute of Medical Research
- 1984 Arthur Norman Exton-Smith, University College Hospital, London
- 1980 David A. Hall, Leeds University

== See also ==
- List of medicine awards
