= Gerodiversity =

Multicultural approach to issues of aging

Gerodiversity is the multicultural approach to issues of aging. This approach provides a theoretical foundation for the medical and psychological treatment of older adults within an ecological context that includes their cultural identity and heritage, social environment, community, family system, and significant relationships. Gerodiversity encompasses a social justice framework, which considers the social and historical dynamics of privilege and inequality. In addition to issues of aging, gerodiversity includes race, ethnicity, language, gender identity, socioeconomic status, physical ability or disability, sexual orientation, level of education, country of origin, location of residence, and religion or spirituality.

Gerodiversity builds on the field of clinical geropsychology, which applies psychological and developmental methods to understanding the behavioral, emotional, cognitive, and biological aspects of aging in the context of providing clinical care to older adults. The goal is to develop culturally competent, scientific methods for the psychological and medical treatment of the aging population. According to this perspective, in order to ethically and scientifically provide optimal care to older adults, clinicians must be aware of the cultural factors in health care utilization, including use of physical and mental health care. Moreover, from this perspective, clinicians must continually work to improve their multicultural knowledge base, skill set, and attitudes towards cultural diversity.

== Demographics and characteristics to consider in geriatric populations ==
Increased awareness and attention to gerodiversity parallels the aging demography of the United States. Older adults comprise 14.5% of the U.S. population, with those aged 65 and older numbering 46.2 million. Dubbed "the Silver Tsunami", this segment of the population is rapidly growing, and the Administration on Aging expects it to double to 98 million older persons by 2060. Aging confers a unique risk of marginalization due to the intersection of advanced age and other disadvantaged factors. The domains of diversity discussed herein may intersect with age in such a way to confer a "double jeopardy". More recently, attention has been paid to those who face a "triple threat of marginalization" (e.g., older lesbian women). As with other conceptualizations of diversity and marginalization, advanced age and other sociodemographic variables intersect and result in unique experiences for each group and individual. Below are a few highlighted areas for consideration.

== Sex and gender ==
Older adults are more likely to be female. Women live longer than men, and so populations of older adults are, with each successive age bracket, increasingly dominated by women. Over half (58%) of Americans over age 65 are women, a number which rises to 69% over age 85, and finally to 80% over age 100.

Older men and women also have different medical and psychological health needs, as well as different profiles of risk and protective factors for acquiring physical and mental disorders. Many biological and psychosocial variables are responsible for these differences. Sex-specific hormonal and physiological differences contribute to different risks for cancer, cardiovascular disease, arthritis, osteoporosis, diabetes, depression, and dementia. Environmental and lifestyle factors, such as sleeping, eating, and exercise habits, social network, socioeconomic resources and stressors, and intellectual engagement in work and leisure activities, also significantly contribute to physical and mental health, and are differentiated between older men and older women. Older women are more likely to have a robust social network—a factor associated with better physical and mental health. Older women from other countries tend to acculturate differently than elderly men. Older women are also twice as likely to live in poverty as older men.

Cultural groups assign different roles and values to individuals based on their gender. Women in some cultural groups are less likely to have been employed, and have lower economic resources as a result. Women are also more likely to bear most of the caregiving responsibilities for ailing family members and young children.

== Race and ethnicity ==
Ethnogeriatrics is defined by the American Geriatrics Society as the "influence of ethnicity and culture on the health the well-being of older adults". In 2015, non-Hispanic White Americans made up an estimated 61.72% of the US population, but that percentage is anticipated to drop to 43.65% by 2060. This demographic shift will be due in part to increases in Asian and Pacific Islander and Latino/Hispanic immigrants. However, Latino and Hispanic older adults as a group are expected to increase the most dramatically, by 155%.

Older adults of different ethnicities belong to different cultural groups, and may therefore have significantly different levels of access to care, different beliefs about health and aging, different expectations from care providers, and different ways of communicating their needs. In addition, ethnic minorities are vulnerable to multiple forms of minority stress: racial prejudice, discrimination, and stereotyping may contribute to lower socioeconomic status, diminished access to care, and systematic disempowerment for many minority groups in the United States. These factors have a major impact on vulnerability to poorer health, risk of mental disorders, and poorer overall prognosis.

Individuals may also belong to multiple racial and ethnic groups: older adults may be biracial or multiracial, belong to indigenous or nonindigenous populations, or be immigrants or the children of immigrants. Different ethnic groups have different genetic and cultural vulnerabilities to medical and psychological problems, which require culturally knowledgeable care.

== Sexual and gender minorities ==
Sexual and gender minorities (lesbian, gay, bisexual, pansexual, transgender, and nongendered individuals) make up an increasing portion of aging populations, and prevalence rates of these groups are expected to rise dramatically. It is estimated that 1.5 million Americans over age 65 identify as lesbian, gay, or bisexual. Because LGBT older adults are less likely to have children and more likely to be single than heterosexual older adults, reduced family support and long-term care is available to them. LGBT older adults also have lower rates of health insurance coverage, and fear discrimination by doctors and mental health care facilities. Among LGBT older adults, 8.3% have reported abuse by a caretaker due to sexual orientation or gender identity. Professional caregivers are also often untrained in the special needs of LGBT populations, and LGBT elders may be overlooked or ignored by many programs oriented towards older populations. The American Psychological Association offers a poignant article about the "double-whammy discrimination" from healthcare provider biases that affect the quality of care of older LGBT patients.

Research has shown that LGBT elders tend to be unwelcome in senior centers and volunteer programs for older adults, and tend to be overlooked in public outreach programs geared towards the elderly. They also may be denied independent housing, as well as entrance to residential nursing home and retirement communities based on sexual orientation or gender identity. They may be isolated from social resources they may otherwise have had from their extended families due to discrimination. In addition, LGBT elders may still be denied visitation rights and end-of-life decision making for their partners and loved ones by hospitals, despite the marriage equality ruling of 2015.

== Religious and/or spiritual identity ==
Older adults tend to be more deeply involved in religious activities than younger adults. Bengston, Putney, Silverstein, and Harris studied aging patterns and generation trends regarding religiosity (namely, Christianity and Judaism) in the United States. Ultimately, the results indicated an overall aging effect with an upward drift in religious intensity and strength of beliefs. Additionally, there was a generational effect indicating different conceptualizations of a monotheistic God based on one's generational cohort and a greater separation between religiosity and spirituality in later-born cohorts.

In a longitudinal study, Wink and Dillon found that adults increased significantly in spirituality between late middle (mid-50s to early 60s) and older adulthood (late 60s to mid-70s); this finding was irrespective of gender and generational cohort. They defined spirituality as "the self's existential search for ultimate meaning through an individualized understanding of the sacred".

Glicksman suggests that one be cautious when interpreting the results of research on spirituality, suggesting that measurement scales are often biased by the Protestant traditions that have shaped the American majority culture. Thus, while it is important to consider how age may impact religiosity and spirituality, it is also important to maintain a sensitive and multicultural approach to understanding an individual's unique relationship with his/her religion and how it may be impacted by other cultural variables, such as country of origin, race, and ethnicity.

Based on the research cited above, it is clear that religion and spirituality are relevant issues for older adults but that these terms may be conceptualized differently and also hold different levels of importance to different individuals. Professionals must be aware of this level of diversity when working with a geriatric population.

== Ability and disability status ==
Older adults who are aging with disabilities are yet another diverse group of individuals, with estimates of approximately 12 to 15 million older adults aging with early-onset disabilities. As medical and social advances increase and improve lifespan and quality of life for those with disabilities, this number will continue to grow. These individuals may experience unique stigma related to the aging process. A seminal and widely adopted definition of "successful aging" included growing older without disability as a hallmark of such success. However, Romo and colleagues conducted a focus group of ethnically diverse older adults with disabilities and found that despite disability, the majority felt they were aging successfully. Such individuals often employed diverse coping strategies to compensate for any changes in physical functioning. As with other groups of older adults, healthcare goals for those with disabilities emphasize reducing risk for chronic disease and preventing further disability and morbidity. However, such a narrow sense of "success" that precludes disability may limit inclusion and diversity. Like other aspects of gerodiversity and experience of marginalization, understanding an individual's sense of successful aging within the context of disability is subjective and likely varies between individuals. Conceptualization of gerodiversity should strive toward inclusion and thus include both disability/ability status as well as subjective experiences of "successful aging", including adaptation and coping with any physical limitations.

== Socioeconomic status ==
Socioeconomic status (SES) is frequently a combined measure of income, education, and occupation. One's SES impacts one's daily life and opportunities, especially those related to quality of life and health care. The elderly in the United States are one of the most economically vulnerable groups. As of 2006, nearly 10% of the elderly in the United States lived below the poverty line. An inability to work, declines in health, and the loss of a spouse are a few of the causes contributing to a lowering of one's SES as one ages. Female and racial/ethnic minority statuses are additional risk-factors for low SES in older adults. Fleck reported that approximately 23% of older African Americans and 19% of older Hispanics live in poverty; Lee and Shaw found that women are nearly twice as likely to be impoverished as males.

The American Psychological Association reports that older adults with low SES can only afford substandard levels of care, if at all, and that mortality rates are significantly higher in low SES older adults. This applies to both physical and mental health care. Additionally, older adults with lower education and/or who come from low-income environments are more likely to develop depression; these risk factors are also associated with higher incidences of Alzheimer's disease and dementia. It is important to be aware of an older patient or client's resources and coping styles. Healthcare providers and other professionals working with older adults must also be aware of what their community may offer for aging individuals of low SES.

== Rural versus urban living environment ==
According to the National Rural Health Association (NRHA), the elderly make up a large percentage of the rural American population with approximately 20% of older adults living in non-metropolitan areas. The living environment and occupational opportunities available to rural elders impacts their health throughout their lifetime. Furthermore, their health is impacted by limited access to care for prevention, management, and treatment of physical and mental health conditions. It can be particularly difficult for elders and their families when they have difficulty completing activities of daily living and are unable to provide their own transportation.

It is important to acknowledge and maintain awareness of the obstacles to healthcare that older individuals in rural communities face. Some older research did not find rural older adults to be disadvantaged in their use of health-related services in comparison to urban dwelling older adults. However, distance to providers and healthcare facilities have been cited as a common barrier among rural-dwelling veterans. While not an issue exclusive to rural locations, older adults cite difficulty traveling and lack of transportation, as well as affordability of care, as the most common barriers to utilizing psychological services. Transportation barriers to healthcare access may be most notable for those with lower incomes. Telehealth (also known as telemedicine; with related specialties of telepsychiatry, telemental health, and telenursing, to name a few ) is one such way that health care providers, researchers, and policy makers are striving to offset the physical distance and related barriers in rural health care delivery. Such provision of services using telecommunications can also be used to deliver care when patients are immobilized, have chronic conditions requiring monitoring, or are homebound.

== National identity/origins ==
An increasing number of Americans, both adults and older adults, can claim a foreign national identity. The Pew Research Center projects that by 2050, nearly one in five Americans will be foreign born. Issues of national origin may dovetail with issues of citizenship for some older adults; the latter confers social and legal rights that interact with the experience of aging to include access to healthcare (including Medicare in the U.S.) and other social and financial welfare programs (e.g., Social Security). In addition, cultural perspectives of aging can profoundly shape one's experience of growing old. Regardless of citizenship, older adults with diverse national identities may experience the aging process differently in the U.S. compared to their country of origin. There is much variability with which cultures approach aging, frailty, and death. For some, a veneration of youth marks aging as a shameful process and likely contributes to ageism in the U.S. and other Westernized countries. However, an increasingly globalized world requires a review of theoretical frameworks and research agendas to better understand cross-cultural differences in aging attitudes.

== Courses of action ==
A report of the APA Committee on Aging offered overarching recommendations for fostering multicultural competencies in working with older adults. Clinicians, researchers, and others in organizations that interface with older adults are called upon to recognize and dispel ageism, both professionally and personally. Key to this is recognizing age as an element of cultural diversity. There are multiple levels at which to conceptualize gerodiversity, beginning with individual factors, and expanding to organizational, institutional, political, and societal frameworks. The article herein emphasizes individual experiences of social inequality to consider with the acknowledgement that aging occurs in a diverse sociocultural and political milieu. Gerodiversity and multicultural competence also posits that age will intersect with other elements of diversity, with incredible variation among individuals. Above all, a gerodiversity approach emphasizes the strengths that come from cultural diversity.

Fostering such a multicultural approach to the issues of aging is a developmental process that begins with education and training and evolves over the course of one's professional and personal experiences. Molinari recommended that opportunities for education and training with older adults be available as early as high school and college. There is a dearth of healthcare workers, including psychologists and physicians, adequately trained to address the needs of the aging population. Therefore, some advocate for geriatric training as a core competency in graduate and internship programs in clinical psychology. Notably, the US Health Resources and Services Administration (HRSA) has devoted funding to preparing health care providers, including nurses, social workers, and psychologists, to better meet the needs of older adults through the Geriatric Workforce Enhancement Program.

Notably, one's development and competency in gerodiversity extends past one's formal education. Molinari urges clinicians and researchers to seek independent learning opportunities with a multicultural focus and inclusion of the geriatric population. Providers and policy makers are encouraged to provide outreach for physical and mental health care for older adults, perhaps in the context of equally diverse settings, such as faith communities. The APA Guidelines for Psychological Practice with Older Adults advises clinicians to promote evidence-based treatments shown to be effective with older populations, and seek supervision or consultation on such practice issues. Finally, from a systems perspective, a gerodiverse approach to clinical practice, research, and policy will be fostered with research on evidence-based treatment approaches for diverse older adults, as well as dissemination of such work so that the public is educated about common mental disorders in the elderly, which may eliminate stigma. Supporting federal initiatives to train health workers in gerontology, particularly with multicultural considerations, and advocating for increased funding for research in these areas, is a crucial ongoing step.

== See also ==
- Gender variance
