= Narrative gerontology =

Narrativity has previously been applied as a method of research and form of therapy. Narrative gerontology applies narratives to explore the metaphor of “life as story” and is intended as a “heuristic for the study of aging”. Thus, narrative gerontology can be understood as a method to view ageing and what it entails and it encompasses the view that people can add value to their lives by creating and maintaining a personal narrative.

== Motives for creating narratives ==
Constructing narratives can be thought to be primarily motivated by the desire to make sense of experiences. Narratives may be combined with interpersonal manipulation such as teaching or impressing listeners.

Possible needs to gain meaning from experiences include:

1. Interpreting experiences concerning objective goals or subjective fulfilment states. Stems from the desire to obtain rewards for the self. Expressing an event in specific ways can manipulate others’ perceptions and inferences thereby increasing chances of obtaining the reward.
2. Seeking value by constructing stories that depict actions positively. People may feel that they do not completely hold certain identities until these identities reach social reality (through being recognised and accepted by others). Therefore, stories may be told to cause surrounding people to validate identity claims.
3. To pass along information. Narratives appear to be effective in teaching others. For example, the average college student will typically recall illustrative anecdotes to a greater degree than the actual principles taught.
4. The desire to attract others and seeking self-worth. Narratives that evoke emotional movement can be used to entertain people which aids in increasing the narrator’s attractiveness.

== Themes ==
Gerontological narratives are organized around a number of themes, such as time, story and wisdom.

=== Time ===
The narrative perspective takes the stance that time is human, not real and felt, not measured. In this respect, human time is considered ‘narrative’ or ‘story time’. Storytime embodies the subjective time of an individual’s life and may vary with flow and focus.

==== Flow ====
Storytime is considered open with humans being unable to foreshadow events because there are no set endings available to send signals to the past. However, it has been argued that in later reminiscing about life, an individual may “backshadow” where “the past is treated as if it had inevitability lead to the present”. A further proposed possibility called “sideshadowing” refers to a middle realm of possibility where actual events in addition to potential events are made visible.

==== Focus ====
Instead of equal attention, humans have a varied focus on each occurrence in life. For example, multiple years can be summarised under titles like “good times” or short events can take much longer to recall. Discourse time refers to the inequities between experiences and recollections and can be broken down into three overarching features – order, duration and frequency.

=== Story ===
Self-storying takes the viewpoint of a novel analogy whereby there is a focus on the narrativity of life in addition to the way it is a “story-world”. It involves stages, levels, genres and contexts.

==== Stages ====
Three phases of narrative development have been outlined. The pre-mythic phase occurs during childhood, whereby material is being gathered for what later becomes part of the narrative. The mythic phase occurs between adolescence to adulthood and narratives are engaged with greater awareness. The post-mythic phase occurs in later adulthood, during which people edit and retell their life stories.

==== Levels ====
- The “outside” story – unevaluated events of one’s existence, the sum of which form the “whole” story.
- The “inside” story – an individual’s experience of life. It refers to what is subjectively made of or from stories and is considered an edit of the outside story.
- The “inside-out” story – the inside story that is expressed to others. It can depend on a range of factors such as the storyteller’s mood or audience.
- The “outside-in” story – personal or external interpretations of one’s story that are imposed on their life.

==== Genres ====
Narratives are typically constructed to reach a particular goal and may take three forms:

- Progressive – progress toward achieving the goal is enhanced.
- Regressive – progress toward achieving the goal is impeded.
- Stability – there is no change in progress toward achieving the goal.

Combinations of these forms can result in the formation of genres within narratives. For example, progressive to regressive could be considered a tragedy.

==== Contexts ====
Narratives can be culturally shaped, involving societies within which humans live. Narrative environments refer to stories of immediate communities such as families, along with broader communities such as gender and any ideological or religious master narratives that the individual believes in.

=== Wisdom ===
The subjective understanding of wisdom development includes patterns in narrative structure, self-reflective processes and life-event characteristics. Narrative coherence, meaning-making and personal growth have been positively correlated with wisdom in addition to the reconstructive and analytical components of self-reflection. Life events tend to be relatively fundamental, culturally non-normative and emotionally negative. Other frequently reported events include those concerning relationships (such as divorce) and those that are life-threatening (such as serious illness).

== Investigations ==
Research suggests that the richer the story the more resilient the person.

Using guided autobiographies, research has found that as individuals aged, their narratives suggested they were self-attributing traits of the opposite genders, albeit to different extents. As such, on an individual level, narratives of men and women and how they interpret their lives is not explained by gender role stereotypes.

Research suggests narratives can differ depending on the mode of narration. Overall, autobiographical writing groups express more self-refining moments or those related to individual turning points. Conversely, oral reminiscence groups express more group-defining or generally shared historical moments.

Traumatic events challenge the ability to create narratives that provide meaning to events due to the desire to avoid the reflection of associated memories. However, the perception of social support may aid the creation or maintenance of a coherent narrative identity. Analysis of narratives of male veterans found that those with coherent narratives reported positive interactions with family and friends in earlier and later life while those with incoherent narratives reported negative interactions.

== Inclusion of technology ==
Common motivations for sharing life narratives through reminiscence involve the maintenance of a sense of self and the intergenerational transfer of knowledge. Further purposes include reinforcing claims to dignity and acting as a means of revisiting positive experiences. However, the nearness of death can create feelings of potential ‘social erasure’. Recording memories using digital tools have been explored, including the possibility of intergenerational digital storytelling. The ability to preserve memories thus provide a semblance of ‘life after death’ and a method of allowing the elderly to feel that they continue to play a role in their loved ones’ lives once they pass.

== See also ==
- Narrative
- Narrative identity
- Digital storytelling
