= Sallie Lamb =

Scientist

Sallie Lamb FMedSci
- Born: Sarah Elizabeth Lamb
- Education: University of Salford (BSc); University of Southampton (MSc); University of Oxford (PhD)
- Awards: Harkness Fellowship
- Scientific career
- Fields: Health care
- Workplaces: University of Exeter; University of Oxford; University of Warwick; National Institute on Aging
- Thesis: Epidemiological and clinical studies of mobility limitation in frail older women (1997)
- Doctoral advisor: John Grimley Evans
- Website: Sallie Lamb profile

Sarah Elizabeth Lamb (known as Sallie) FMedSci is the Pro-Vice-Chancellor and Executive Dean of the Faculty of Health and Life Sciences at the University of Exeter, and the Mireille Gillings Professor for Health Innovation. She is also an Honorary Departmental Professor at the Nuffield Department of Medicine, University of Oxford and was the Foundation Director of the Oxford Clinical Trials Research Unit.

== Early life and education ==
Lamb graduated in 1986 from the University of Salford School of Physiotherapy. For her postgraduate studies she moved to the University of Southampton, where she completed a Masters in Rehabilitation. She completed her Doctor of Philosophy degree at the University of Oxford, working with John Grimley Evans on the mobility of frail elderly people.

== Research and career ==
After completing her PhD, Lamb joined the National Institute on Aging as a Harkness Fellow. She completed a degree in statistics at the University of Sheffield, and was appointed a Fellow of the Royal Statistical Society. She is a member of the Idea, Development, Exploration, Assessment, Long-term Follow-up, Improving the Quality of Research in Surgery (IDEAL) collaboration.

In 2008 the National Institute for Health and Care Excellence recognised Lamb as one of the top 200 investigators contributing to health research in the UK. In 2009 she was appointed chair of the National Institute for Health Research Health Technology Assessment Commissioning Board.

Lamb is a medical researcher at the University of Exeter. She is committed to improving the quality of medical trials to ensure better patient outcomes and value for money. Her career involves both clinical trials and musculoskeletal rehabilitation. She works on interventions that can improve the function of elderly people with cognitive impairments and comorbidities. She is particularly interested in minimally invasive approaches to target geriatric syndromes and manage severe injury. These include the rehabilitation of chronic conditions and non-medical healthcare contact.

Prior to joining the University of Exeter in 2019 Lamb led the Nuffield Department of Orthopaedics, Rheumatology and Musculoskeletal Sciences at the University of Oxford. In 2009 she identified that cast worn below the knee could improve severe ankle sprains, which account for 1.5 million emergency room attendances per year in the UK. In 2011 she was part of a National Institute for Health and Care Excellence (NICE) guideline on the management of hip fractures. In 2012 she founded the Rehab Research lab group at the University of Oxford. She looked at various treatments for Whiplash and found that whilst physiotherapy has short-term benefits, including improvement of neck mobility, it is not cost-effective. She appeared on the Association of Trauma and Orthopaedic Chartered Physiotherapists Physio Matters Podcast in 2015. She believes that physios should be challenging low-quality, flawed, clinical trials and improve medical practice. She identified that a hand exercise programme improves quality and function for Rheumatoid arthritis patients. She has also found that education and targeted training can improve the physical activity of patients with lower back pain. In 2020, she identified that 'Advice by mail, screening for fall risk, and a targeted exercise or multifactorial intervention to prevent falls did not result in fewer fractures than advice by mail alone.

=== Awards and honours ===
In 2018 Lamb became a Fellow of the Chartered Institute of Physiotherapy, in 2016 she was elected as Fellow of the Academy of Medical Sciences (FMedSci). She was also awarded an honorary doctorate from Brunel University London. Lamb is a trustee of Arthritis Research UK.
