= Clinical geropsychology =

Clinical geropsychology is the application by psychologists in a range of sub-disciplines (clinical psychology, counseling psychology) of "the knowledge and methods of psychology to understanding and helping older persons and their families to maintain well-being, overcome problems and achieve maximum potential during later life".

== Background and definition ==
The population of the world is aging at a rapid rate. Globally, those aged 60 years or over numbered 962 million in 2017, more than twice as large as the number of older persons in 1980. The number of older persons is expected to double again by 2050, when it is projected to reach nearly 2.1 billion persons. Globally, the number of persons aged 80 years or over is projected to increase more than threefold between 2017 and 2050, rising from 137 million to 425 million. For the first time in human history, the world has more individuals age 65 and older than those age 5 years old and under.

The Administration on Aging reports that people age 65 and older constituted about 15.6% of the US population in 2017, and these numbers are expected to grow exponentially. From 2007-2017, the population age 65 and over saw a 34% increase, compared with a 4% increase for the under-65 population. By 2040, there will be an estimated 80.8 million older adults in the US, constituting approximately 21.6% of the population.

According to the World Health Organization, over 20% of adults aged 60 and over have a mental or neurological disorder (excluding headache disorders), and 6.6% of all disability (disability adjusted life years-DALYs) among people over 60 years is attributed to mental and neurological disorders. In addition, older adults often experience a multitude of changes in later life, including declines in health, loss of loved ones, work transitions, changes in residence, and loss of independence, and the approach of their mortality.

Given the expected growth of the older adult population, many psychologists will end up working with older adults in some way, and all psychologists therefore need to be aware of issues related to aging and their context. However, some older adults may benefit from seeing a provider with specialty training in aging, such as clinical geropsychologists, who are trained to address a variety of mental and behavioral health challenges common in later life.

Clinical geropsychologists have specialized training to address problems such as depression, anxiety, neurocognitive disorders (e.g., dementia, mild cognitive impairment [MCI]) caused by problems such as Alzheimer's disease, caregiver stress, grief and bereavement, end-of-life care issues, and physical health problems (e.g., sleep disorders, diabetes, cardiovascular disease). Geropsychologists are also sensitive to multicultural issues of aging in clinical practice, research, and policy (gerodiversity).

Geropsychologists provide psychological assessment and intervention to older adults and their families, as well as consultation services to other health care professionals. These psychological services are provided in a variety of settings and contexts, including private practice, community mental health, integrated medical settings (e.g., primary care), rehabilitation care, inpatient psychiatric settings, residential care, long-term care, adult day health programs, and many other settings. Geropsychologists are also trained to work in universities, academic hospitals and medical settings, research institutes, and public policy settings.

== Early history ==
In 1946, Sydney Pressey, PhD., and a coalition of supporters helped establish the Adult Development and Aging Division of the American Psychological Association (APA) devoted to the study of older adults and adult development. The APA approved the Adult Development and Aging Division with a vote of 20 to 3, thus establishing it as the first aging-related expansion of the APA.

In 1946, the first meeting of the Adult Development and Aging Division was held with 13 people in attendance. Despite its modest beginnings, by 1952, the annual meeting of the Adult Development and Aging Division was held jointly with the Gerontological Society in Washington, D.C. At this meeting, Harold Jones, a lifespan psychologist and director of the California-based Institute of Child Welfare, addressed the conference and argued for the establishment of "A national institute on the problems of aging." Though it would be another 22 years before the National Institute of Aging (NIA) was established, in only six years, the Adult Development and Aging Division was able to establish its agenda as a national concern warranting increased government attention.

In a 1953 meeting of the Adult Development and Aging Division, Nathan Shock, PhD., the founder of one of the first longitudinal studies on aging, the Baltimore Longitudinal Study of Aging, asked the psychologists present to consider "practical" issues of maturity and old age. This was the first known reference to a more applied and clinical approach to a psychology of aging outside of the medical field.

In 1959, the National Institute of Mental Health (NIMH) established a section devoted to aging, and appointed James Emmett Birren, PhD, as chief of this division. Birren's research focused on neurological, sensory, perceptual and cognitive functions in aging, and he is often considered the first modern experimental aging researcher. As the chief of the section on aging at NIMH, he was instrumental as an organizer and promoter of the field. He developed and edited the Handbook of the Psychology of Aging, became editor-in-chief of the Journal Gerontology, and eventually went on to become the president of the Gerontological Society of America.

In 1971, a White House Conference on Aging found that the education and training of health professionals working with older adults was urgently warranted. The conference recommended the creation of an aging institute, and in 1971 The Research on Aging Act was introduced. In 1974, The Research on Aging Act passed in Congress, and President Nixon signed the bill thus creating the National Institute on Aging (NIA). This was a pivotal moment in the emergence of clinical geropsychology as a distinct field of practice.

== Clinical training and national conferences ==
As the first president of the National Institute of Aging, Robert Butler, MD, made his first mission to enhance the education and training of health professionals in the field of aging. Recognizing the dearth of training opportunities for geriatric clinicians and researchers, the Adult Development and Aging Division, with support from the APA and funding from the NIA, assembled a task force in November 1977 to "assess the psychological needs of older adults and provide recommendations concerning the involvement of psychologists in mental health services to the older populations." This set the stage for the first of three monumental conferences on geropsychology: the 1981 conference on Training Psychologists for Work in Aging, known as the "Older Boulder" conference, held in Boulder, Colorado (in contrast to the "Boulder" conference of 1949 at which standards were made for the training of PhD clinical psychologists in general [i.e., the "Boulder model"]). At this conference, psychologists began discussing the knowledge base of geropsychology and how this information could be taught to new geropsychologists. The goal of Older Boulder was "to identify the resources we can use to develop and expand training in aging for psychologists… [and to] develop a set of policy recommendations." Older Boulder's organizers stressed the importance of a multidisciplinary approach to aging training, and thus, they encouraged general psychologists, geropsychologists, non-psychology gerontologists, consumers and students to attend the conference. In total, nearly 100 people participated in the conference.

The results of the Older Boulder conference were detailed in the publication Psychology and the Older Adult: Challenges for Training in the 1980s as well as a full report from the conference and many position papers on various topics. Most importantly, Older Boulder was a key first step to creating a training model for competencies for geropsychologists.

The second national conference, "Older Boulder II," was held in Washington DC in 1992. At this conference, a greater focus was placed on skills training as well as the multiple levels of clinical training. This conference focused on defining the knowledge base for professional geropsychology practice, outlining three levels of geropsychology competence: Exposure, Experience, and Expertise.

The third national conference was held in 2006 in Colorado Springs, Colorado, organized in large part by Professor Bob Knight and Michele Karel. At this conference, a “Pikes Peak” model of training was established for geropsychologists. The Pikes Peak model coalesced the information already known about older adults and applied it to the establishment of competency areas for the training of geropsychologists. For example, the model highlighted the need for training programs to educate students to differentiate between healthy and pathological aging, normative changes associated with later life, cohort effects, general knowledge about adult development, and various care settings for older adults, especially interdisciplinary care.

== Society of Clinical Geropsychology (American Psychological Association Division 12, Section II) ==
In 1993, Division 12 (Clinical Psychology) of the American Psychological Association organized a subsection (Division 12, Section II) that would eventually be renamed the Society of Clinical Geropsychology. This was done at the initiative of a steering committee composed of several psychologists, including: George Niederehe, Barry Edelstein, Dolores Gallagher-Thompson, Margaret Gatz, Alfred Kaszniak, Norm Abels, Michael A. Smyer, George Stricker, and Linda Teri. The Society's mission is fostering the mental health and wellness of older adults through science, practice, education and advocacy and by advancing the field of professional geropsychology. The Society is active in promoting and supporting training in geropsychology at the doctoral, internship, and postdoctoral level, advocating for geropsychology in public policy, and promoting aging research that informs clinical practice. The Society recently celebrated its 25th anniversary in 2018.

== Recognition of specialty area ==
Professional geropsychology was acknowledged as a proficiency area by the American Psychological Association in 1997, and was recognized as a specialty area by APA in 2010. Additionally, in 2013, geropsychology was established as an emerging specialty area by the American Board of Professional Psychology, allowing psychologists to attain board certification in Geropsychology as of December 2014. The examination manual is available online. After initial screening and favorable review of a practice sample, applicants sit for an oral examination consisting of three parts: review of the Practice Sample, review of the Professional Self-Study Statement, and an Ethical Reasoning Review. In 2014, Forrest Scogin, professor of clinical psychology at the University of Alabama, received the M. Powell Lawton Award for Distinguished Contributions to Clinical Geropsychology.
