= Biogerontology (journal) =

- Discipline: Biogerontology
- Language: English
- Edited by: Suresh Rattan

Publication details
- History: 2000–present
- Publisher: Springer Science+Business Media
- Frequency: Bimonthly
- Open access: Hybrid
- Impact factor: 4.4 (2023)

Standard abbreviations
- ISO 4: Biogerontology

Indexing
- ISSN: 1389-5729 (print); 1573-6768 (web)

Links
- Journal homepage

Biogerontology is a bimonthly peer-reviewed scientific journal published by Springer Science+Business Media. It covers research on the biological mechanisms of ageing. The founding editor-in-chief is Suresh Rattan. According to the Journal Citation Reports, the journal has a 2024 impact factor of 4.4.
