= M. Powell Lawton =

American psychologist

Mortimer Powell Lawton (1923–2001) was an American psychologist who was known for his work on the psychological and social aspects of aging.

== Early life and education ==
Lawton was born in Atlanta and received his undergraduate degree from Haverford College in 1947 and his Ph.D. in clinical psychology from Columbia University in 1952.

== Career ==
Lawton began his career as the chief psychologist at the Veterans Administration Hospital in Providence, Rhode Island.

Lawton held academic positions at the Medical College of Pennsylvania and the Temple University School of Medicine in Philadelphia.

In the early 1960s, he conducted research on the design of living spaces for older adults, including those with Alzheimer's disease. His work influenced the services provided at the Philadelphia Geriatric Center and elder care practices in the United States.

Lawton served as the editor-in-chief of The Annual Review of Gerontology and Geriatrics and was a fellow of the American Psychological Association, where he also served as the president of its division focused on adult development and aging. He was a founding editor of the journal Psychology and Aging. Colleagues dedicated a book to him titled The Many Dimensions of Aging, which explores various aspects of his work.

== Recognition ==
M. Powell Lawton Award is named after him.
