= British Geriatrics Society =

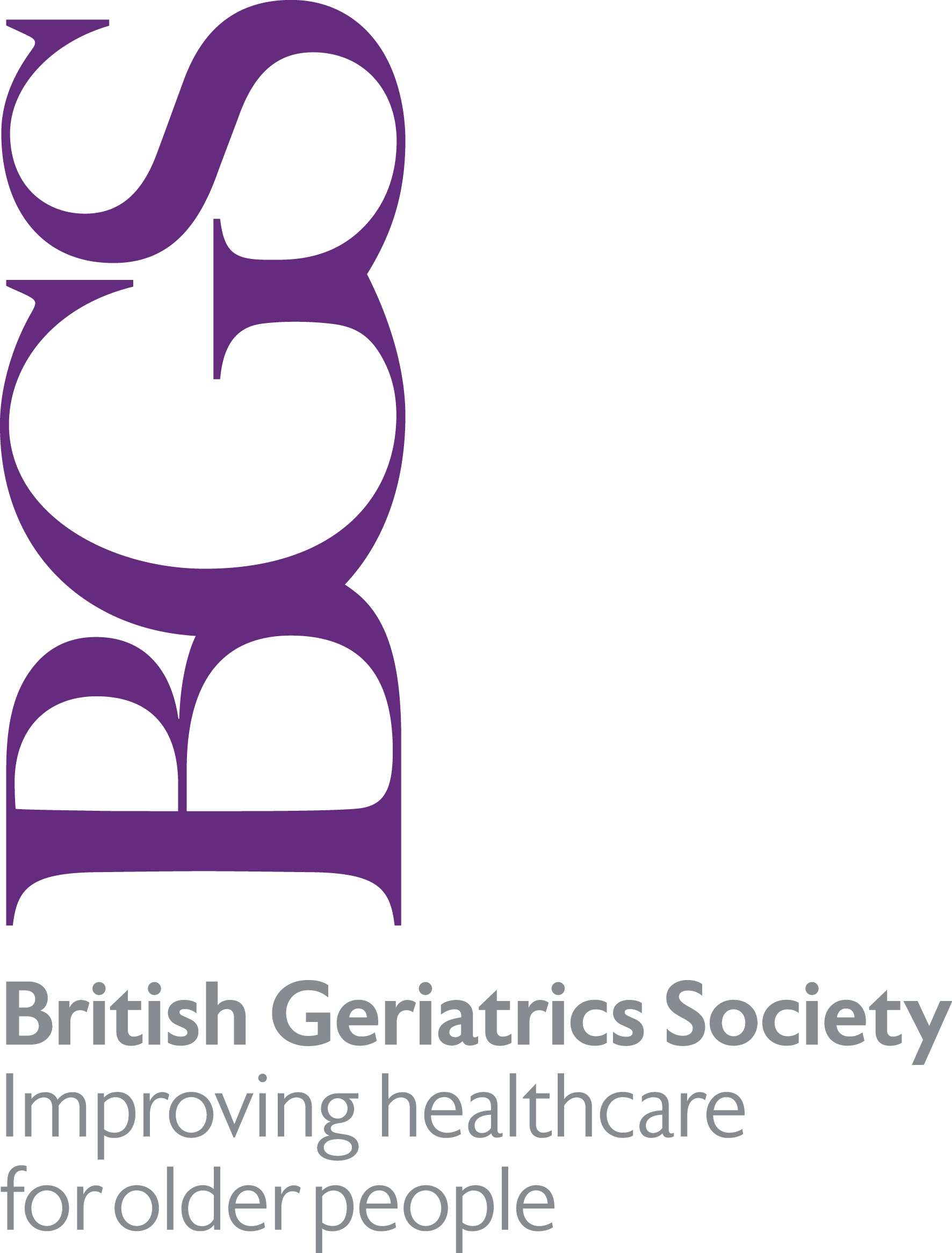
- BGS Logo
- Abbreviation: BGS
- Formation: 1947; 79 years ago
- Type: Professional body
- Purpose: Improving healthcare for older people
- Headquarters: United Kingdom
- Members: 5500
- President: Professor Jugdeep Dhesi
- Main organ: Age and Ageing
- Website: BGS Homepage

The British Geriatrics Society (BGS) is the professional body of specialists in the healthcare of older people in the United Kingdom. Membership is drawn from doctors, nurses, allied health professionals, researchers and others working in the field of geriatric medicine with a particular interest in improving healthcare for older people. It has over 4,000 members worldwide and is the only Society in the UK which draws together experts from all the relevant disciplines in the field. The current President is Professor Jugdeep Dhesi.

== History ==
Basil Mackenzie, 2nd Baron Amulree at the ministry of health, Joseph Harold Sheldon in Wolverhampton, Marjory Warren, Trevor Howell in Croydon and Oxford's Lionel Cosin were some of the founders of the Medical Society for the Care of the Elderly in 1947. In time, this would become the British Geriatrics Society and Amulree would lead both until 1973. Its purpose was "the relief of suffering and distress amongst the aged and infirm by the improvement of standards of medical care for such persons, the holding of meetings and the publication and distribution of the results of such research".

The BGS achieves these purposes by holding scientific meetings, producing clinical guidance, sharing best practice and acting as an 'expert voice' on the care of older people and promoting better health in older age. Members lead several national clinical audits in collaboration with other professional bodies such as Royal Colleges, and specialist clinical associations.

== Journal ==
Age and Ageing, which is published by Oxford University Press, is the official journal of the British Geriatrics Society, publishing peer reviewed original articles and commissioned reviews on geriatric medicine and gerontology. Its range includes research on ageing and the clinical, epidemiological and psychological aspects of later life. Its impact factor of 12.782, and is 1st out of 53 journals in the Si: Geriatrics and Gerontology category.
