= International Association of Gerontology and Geriatrics =

- Formation: July 1950
- Type: UN category III NGO
- Location: Ciudad Autónoma de Buenos Aires, Argentina
- Region served: Global
- President: Ricardo Jauregui
- Secretary General: Miguel Angel Acánfora
- Treasurer: Matías Manzotti
- Website: iagg2022.org

The International Association of Gerontology and Geriatrics (IAGG), formerly the International Association of Gerontological Societies is a non-governmental organization (NGO) that promotes gerontological research and training, and represents gerontological organizations internationally.

== History ==
The International Association of Gerontological Societies was founded in July 1950, registered in Liège, Belgium, as an association of organizations involved in gerontology research and training. It was later renamed the International Association of Gerontology, and then the International Association of Gerontology and Geriatrics (IAGG). As of 2009 there were IAGG member societies in 64 countries.

The combined membership of the member organizations was over 45,100 professionals.

== Organization ==
IAGG is an umbrella organization from five regions around the world: Africa, Asia/Oceania, Europe, North America, South America & Caribbean.

IAGG Programs include Global Ageing Research Network, (GARN), Global Social Initiative on Ageing (GSIA), World Academy on Ageing (WAA) and, Council of Student Organizations (CSO). Partnerships include the United Nations (UN) and the World Health Organization (WHO).

== Members ==
Currently, 84 national societies from 72 different countries are represented by IAGG with a combined membership of more than 50,000 professionals and students.

== Consultative status ==
Since 1978, IAGG is a category III non-governmental organization (NGO) at UN with a consultative status with the Economic and Social Council (ECOSOC). In 2009, IAGG was established with the ECOSOC special Consultative Status allowing IAGG to make oral and written statements. IAGG is a member of the Conference of Non-Governmental Organizations (CONGO) in Consultative Relationship with the UN since 1985. An international collaboration between IAGG and eight other NGO's has been set-up to promote major worldwide aging issues.

The IAGG has collaborative partnerships with: • UN Program on Ageing • UN Development Program • UN Population Fund and other UN agencies • World Health Organization's Ageing & Life Course Program
