= Gerontology =

Study of the biological, psychological, and social aspects of aging

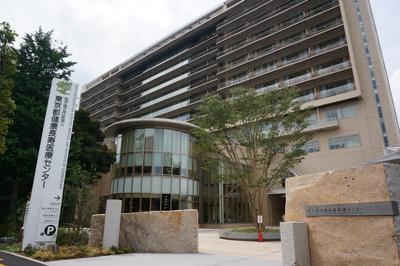
- Tokyo Metropolitan Geriatric Hospital and the Institute of Gerontology.
- Significant diseases: Anxiety, ALS, Cognitive Impairment, Depression, Dementia, Diabetes, Hypertension, Insomnia, MS, Osteoporosis, Parkinson's, Sarcopenia.
- Specialist: Gerontologist

Gerontology is the science of old age and the aging process. It encompasses the understanding, prevention, rehabilitation, diagnosis, prognosis, and treatment of diseases, disorders, and conditions associated with the changes that occur in humans throughout their entire lifespan, with particular emphasis on longevity. Gerontologists work in interdisciplinary care alongside geriatricians, nurses, physiotherapists, nutritionists, dentists, psychologists, patients, families, and other healthcare team members, all aimed at improving quality of life and promoting healthy aging. The healthcare professional dedicated to this discipline is known as a gerontologist. Gerontologists may practice in hospitals, clinics, health centers, personal care, long-term care facilities, research, education, and in health policy and public policy.

While gerontology was initially grounded in biomedical perspectives, the transition to the biopsychosocial model marked a turning point in its evolution. This shift transformed gerontology from a discipline focused on a specific domain to an interdisciplinary field where knowledge from multiple domains is actively integrated to understand and address the complexities of aging across the lifespan. M. Powell Lawton, a psychogerontologist at the Geriatric Center of Philadelphia, was one of the first researchers to recognize the crucial importance of designing living environments tailored to the needs of older adults, particularly those with Alzheimer's disease. As an academic discipline, gerontology is relatively new. In 1975, the Leonard Davis School of Gerontology at the University of Southern California (USC) established the first doctoral, master's, and bachelor's degree programs in the field, formally institutionalizing gerontology as an independent area of study.

== History ==
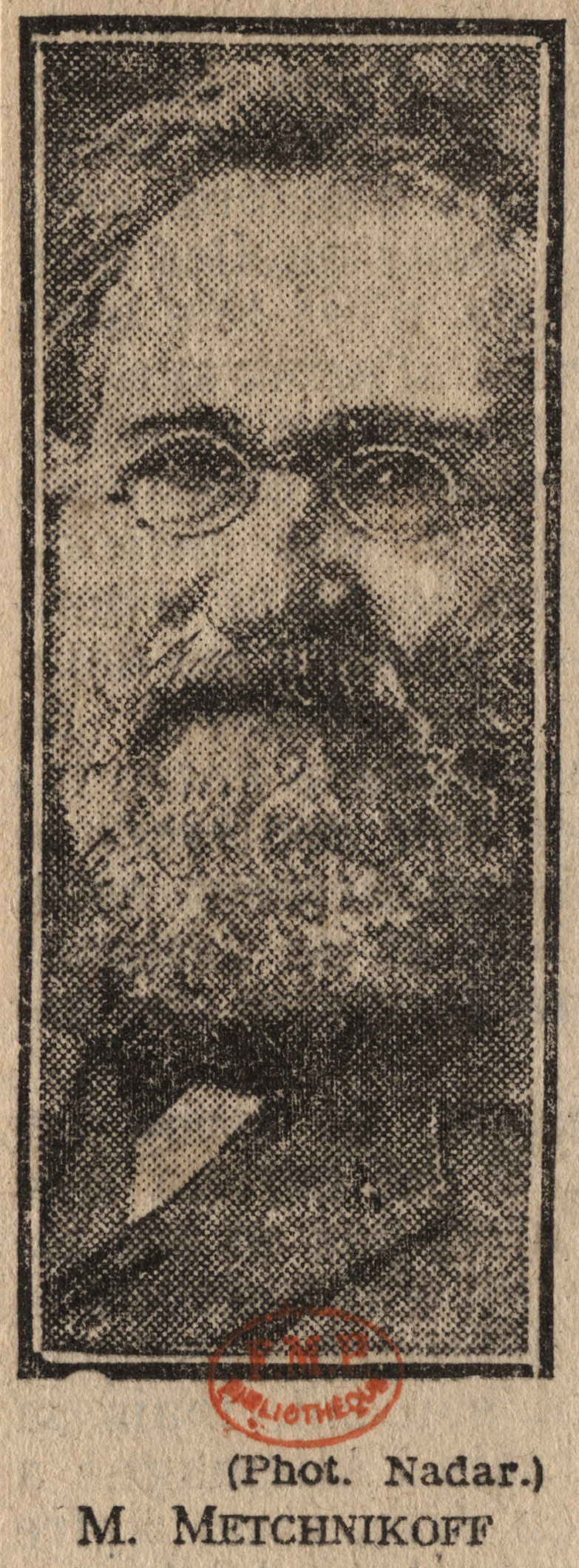
Mechnikov was an influential figure in the development of modern gerontology. He is often considered the father of gerontology.

The oldest known gerontological manuscripts in the world date from the Islamic Golden Age. In The Canon of Medicine (c. 1025), Avicenna dedicated Thesis III to the care of the elderly, providing instructions on diet, exercise—including walking and horseback riding—and various remedies. The Tunisian physician Al-Jazzār (c. 898–980) authored Kitāb Ṭibb al-Mashāyikh, which addressed the pains, ailments, and health maintenance of older adults, covering sleep disorders, forgetfulness, methods to strengthen memory, and the causes of mortality in old age.

During the Renaissance, the physician Gabriele Zerbi (1445–1505) wrote Gerontocomia, scilicet de senum cura (1489), dedicated to Pope Innocent VIII. Considered the first treatise devoted exclusively to gerontology, it reveals a conception far broader than mere clinical intervention, encompassing hygiene, nutrition, exercise, emotional well-being, and disease prevention.

In the 19th century, Adolphe Quetelet (1796-1874) is considered the first gerontologist in history. His work, Sur l'homme et le développement de ses facultés, ou Essai de physique sociale (1835), describes the principles that govern the process by which human beings are born, grow, and die, establishing for the first time aging as a process of development and not merely as deterioration.

At the beginning of the 20th century, the biologist Ilya Ilyich Mechnikov (1845–1916), awarded the Nobel Prize in Physiology or Medicine in 1908 for his work on the immune system, coined the term "gerontology" in 1903, laying the foundations for the creation of this science. Shortly thereafter, in 1909, the physician Ignatz Leo Nascher introduced the term "geriatrics" to define the medical specialty focused on the diagnosis and treatment of diseases in older adults. In his work Geriatrics: The Diseases of Old Age and Their Treatment (1914), Nascher established a fundamental principle that still distinguishes modern gerontology: senescence constitutes a distinct physiological process, not a disease. By asserting that "senescence is not due to any cause" and that "disease is not always a causal or even essential factor," he laid the groundwork for the distinction between normal aging and pathological aging.

The consolidation of gerontology as an independent scientific discipline with international reach is largely due to the physician and gerontologist Vladimir Korenchevsky (1880–1959). In 1937 he founded the British Club for Research on Ageing, which in 1945 became the British Gerontological Society and later the British Society for Research on Ageing. That same year, with support from the Nuffield Foundation, he established the Oxford Gerontological Unit at the University of Oxford, a pioneering center for experimental gerontology. Largely due to his efforts, the International Association of Gerontological Societies was formed in Liège, Belgium, in July 1950, later renamed the International Association of Gerontology and Geriatrics (IAGG). For these foundational contributions, the gerontological community widely recognizes him as the "father of gerontology".

In the second half of the 20th century, the gerontological psychiatrist Robert Butler (1927–2010) coined the term "ageism" in 1969 to denounce systematic discrimination based on age—a process of stereotyping and prejudice that, he argued, led to the social exclusion of older adults and stripped them of purpose and value in modern societies.

The most significant shift in gerontological thought was the gradual rejection of the traditional biomedical model. The gerontologist and physician Alex Comfort (1920–2000), in his work A Good Age (1976), argued that the greatest problem of old age is not physical decline, but the medical and social prejudices that marginalize older people and treat them as inferior or useless. Comfort dismantled numerous myths associated with old age using scientific evidence, demonstrating that much of the deterioration attributed to chronological age was in fact the result of disease, inadequate habits, social isolation, and cultural prejudices. Popularizing the fight against ageism initiated by Butler, A Good Age became a manifesto for active and dignified aging, advocating for autonomy, social participation, and full citizenship for older adults, and promoting the idea that maturity and old age should be lived with fullness, autonomy, mental health, social participation, and holistic well-being. For all these reasons, A Good Age is considered a key text of contemporary gerontology for having consolidated the shift from the traditional biomedical model to the biopsychosocial model that defines the discipline today.

Modern pioneers like James Birren began organizing gerontology as its own field in the 1940s, later being involved in starting a US government agency on aging—the National Institute on Aging—programs in gerontology at the University of Southern California and University of California, Los Angeles, and as past president of the Gerontological Society of America (founded in 1945).

With the population of people over 60 years old expected to be some 22% of the world's population by 2050, assessment and treatment methods for age-related disease burden—the term geroscience emerged in the early 21st century.

== Aging demographics ==
The world is forecast to undergo rapid population aging in the next several decades. In 1900, there were 3.1 million people aged 65 years and older living in the United States. However, this population continued to grow throughout the 20th century and reached 31.2, 35, and 40.3 million people in 1990, 2000, and 2010, respectively. Notably, in the United States and across the world, the "baby boomer" generation began to turn 65 in 2011. Recently, the population aged 65 years and older has grown at a faster rate than the total population in the United States. The total population increased by 9.7%, from 281.4 million to 308.7 million, between 2000 and 2010. However, the population aged 65 years and older increased by 15.1% during the same period. It has been estimated that 25% of the population in the United States and Canada will be aged 65 years and older by 2025. Moreover, by 2050, it is predicted that, for the first time in United States history, the number of individuals aged 60 years and older will be greater than the number of children aged 0 to 14 years. Those aged 85 years and older (oldest-old) are projected to increase from 5.3 million to 21 million by 2050. Adults aged 85–89 years constituted the greatest segment of the oldest-old in 1990, 2000, and 2010. However, the largest percentage point increase among the oldest-old occurred in the 90- to 94-year-old age group, which increased from 25.0% in 1990 to 26.4% in 2010.

With the rapid growth of the aging population, social work education and training specialized in older adults and practitioners interested in working with older adults are increasingly in demand.

=== Gender differences with age ===
There has been a considerable disparity between the number of men and women in the older population in the United States. In both 2000 and 2010, women outnumbered men in the older population at every single year of age (e.g., 65 to 100 years and over). The sex ratio, which is a measure used to indicate the balance of males to females in a population, is calculated by taking the number of males divided by the number of females, and multiplying by 100. Therefore, the sex ratio is the number of males per 100 females. In 2010, there were 90.5 males per 100 females in the 65-year-old population. However, this represented an increase from 1990 when there were 82.7 males per 100 females, and from 2000 when the sex ratio was 88.1. Although the gender gap between men and women has narrowed, women continue to have a greater life expectancy and lower mortality rates at older ages relative to men. For example, the Census 2010 reported that there were approximately twice as many women as men living in the United States at 89 years of age (361,309 versus 176,689, respectively).

=== Geographic distribution of older adults in the United States ===
The number and percentage of older adults living in the United States vary across the four different regions (Northeast, Midwest, West, and South) defined by the United States census. In 2010, the South contained the greatest number of people aged 65 years and older and 85 years and older. However, proportionately, the Northeast contains the largest percentage of adults aged 65 years and older (14.1%), followed by the Midwest (13.5%), the South (13.0%), and the West (11.9%). Relative to the Census 2000, all geographic regions demonstrated positive growth in the population of adults aged 65 years and older and 85 years and older. The most rapid growth in the population of adults aged 65 years and older was evident in the West (23.5%), which showed an increase from 6.9 million in 2000 to 8.5 million in 2010. Likewise, in the population aged 85 years and older, the West (42.8%) also showed the fastest growth and increased from 806,000 in 2000 to 1.2 million in 2010. It is worth highlighting that Rhode Island was the only state that experienced a reduction in the number of people aged 65 years and older, and declined from 152,402 in 2000 to 151,881 in 2010. Conversely, all states exhibited an increase in the population of adults aged 85 years and older from 2000 to 2010.

== Sub-fields ==
As with many disciplines, over the course of the 20th and 21st centuries the field of gerontology has sub-divided into multiple specific disciplines focused on increasingly narrow aspects of the aging process.

=== Biogerontology ===
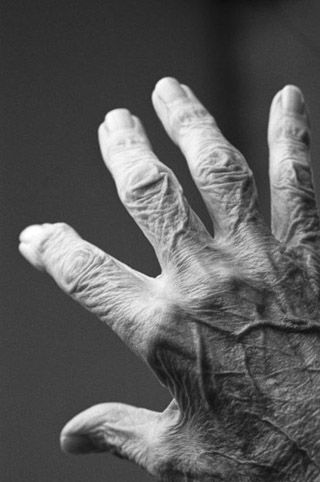
The hand of an older adult

Biogerontology is the special sub-field of gerontology concerned with the biological aging process, its evolutionary origins, and potential means to intervene in the process. Aim of biogerontology is to prevent age-related disease by intervening in aging processes or even eliminate aging per se. Some argue that aging fits the criteria of disease, therefore aging is disease and should be treated as disease. In 2008 Aubrey de Grey said that in case of suitable funding and involvement of specialists there is a 50% chance, that in 25–30 years humans will have technology saving people from dying of old age, regardless of the age at which they will be at that time. His idea is to repair inside cells and between them all that can be repaired using modern technology, allowing people to live until time when technology progress will allow to cure deeper damage. This concept got the name "longevity escape velocity".

A meta analysis of 36 studies concluded that there is an association between age and DNA damage in humans, a finding consistent with the DNA damage theory of aging.

=== Environmental gerontology ===
Environmental gerontology is a specialization within gerontology that seeks an understanding and interventions to optimize the relationship between aging persons and their physical and social environments.

The field emerged in the 1930s during the first studies on behavioral and social gerontology. In the 1970s and 1980s, research confirmed the importance of the physical and social environment in understanding the aging population and improved the quality of life in old age. Studies of environmental gerontology indicate that older people prefer to age in their immediate environment, whereas spatial experience and place attachment are important for understanding the process.

Some research indicates that the physical-social environment is related to the longevity and quality of life of the elderly. Precisely, the natural environment (such as natural therapeutic landscapes, therapeutic garden) contributes to active and healthy aging in the place.

=== Jurisprudential gerontology ===
Jurisprudential gerontology (sometimes referred to as "geriatric jurisprudence") is a specialization within gerontology that looks into the ways laws and legal structures interact with the aging experience. The field started from legal scholars in the field of elder law, which found that looking into legal issues of older persons without a broader inter-disciplinary perspective does not provide the ideal legal outcome. Using theories such as therapeutic jurisprudence, jurisprudential scholars critically examined existing legal institutions (e.g. adult guardianship, end of life care, or nursing homes regulations) and showed how law should look more closely to the social and psychological aspects of its real-life operation. Other streams within jurisprudential gerontology also encouraged physicians and lawyers to try to improve their cooperation and better understand how laws and regulatory institutions affect health and well-being of older persons.

=== Social gerontology ===
Social gerontology is a interdisciplinary sub-field that specializes in studying or working with older adults. Social gerontologists may have degrees or training in social work, nursing, psychology, sociology, demography, public health, or other social science disciplines. Social gerontologists are responsible for educating, researching, and advancing the broader causes of older people.

Because issues of life span and life extension need numbers to quantify them, there is an overlap with demography. Those who study the demography of the human life span differ from those who study the social demographics of aging.

==== Social theories of aging ====
Several theories of aging are developed to observe the aging process of older adults in society as well as how these processes are interpreted by men and women as they age.

===== Activity theory =====
Activity theory was developed and elaborated by Cavan, Havighurst, and Albrecht. According to this theory, older adults' self-concept depends on social interactions. In order for older adults to maintain morale in old age, substitutions must be made for lost roles. Examples of lost roles include retirement from a job or loss of a spouse.

Activity is preferable to inactivity because it facilitates well-being on multiple levels. Because of improved general health and prosperity in the older population, remaining active is more feasible now than when this theory was first proposed by Havighurst nearly six decades ago. The activity theory is applicable for a stable, post-industrial society, which offers its older members many opportunities for meaningful participation. Weakness: Some aging persons cannot maintain a middle-aged lifestyle, due to functional limitations, lack of income, or lack of a desire to do so. Many older adults lack the resources to maintain active roles in society. On the flip side, some elders may insist on continuing activities in late life that pose a danger to themselves and others, such as driving at night with low visual acuity or doing maintenance work to the house while climbing with severely arthritic knees. In doing so, they are denying their limitations and engaging in unsafe behaviors.

===== Disengagement theory =====
Disengagement theory was developed by Cumming and Henry. According to this theory, older adults and society engage in a mutual separation from each other. An example of mutual separation is retirement from the workforce. A key assumption of this theory is that older adults lose "ego-energy" and become increasingly self-absorbed. Additionally, disengagement leads to higher morale maintenance than if older adults try to maintain social involvement. This theory is heavily criticized for having an escape clause—namely, that older adults who remain engaged in society are unsuccessful adjusters to old age.

Gradual withdrawal from society and relationships preserves social equilibrium and promotes self-reflection for elders who are freed from societal roles. It furnishes an orderly means for the transfer of knowledge, capital, and power from the older generation to the young. It makes it possible for society to continue functioning after valuable older members die.

===== Age stratification theory =====
According to this theory, older adults born during different time periods form cohorts that define "age strata". There are two differences among strata: chronological age and historical experience. This theory makes two arguments. 1. Age is a mechanism for regulating behavior and as a result determines access to positions of power. 2. Birth cohorts play an influential role in the process of social change.

===== Life course theory =====
According to this theory, which stems from the life course perspective aging occurs from birth to death. Aging involves social, psychological, and biological processes. Additionally, aging experiences are shaped by cohort and period effects.

Also reflecting the life course focus, consider the implications for how societies might function when age-based norms vanish—a consequence of the deinstitutionalization of the life course—and suggest that these implications pose new challenges for theorizing aging and the life course in postindustrial societies. Dramatic reductions in mortality, morbidity, and fertility over the past several decades have so shaken up the organization of the life course and the nature of educational, work, family, and leisure experiences that it is now possible for individuals to become old in new ways. The configurations and content of other life stages are being altered as well, especially for women. In consequence, theories of age and aging will need to be reconceptualized.

===== Cumulative advantage/disadvantage theory =====
According to this theory, which was developed beginning in the 1960s by Derek Price and Robert Merton and elaborated on by several researchers such as Dale Dannefer, inequalities have a tendency to become more pronounced throughout the aging process. A paradigm of this theory can be expressed in the adage "the rich get richer and the poor get poorer". Advantages and disadvantages in early life stages have a profound effect throughout the life span. However, advantages and disadvantages in middle adulthood have a direct influence on economic and health status in later life.

== See also ==
- Academic journals on gerontology
- Aging and memory
- Aging Portfolio
- Biological clock
- Bionics
- Clinical geropsychology
- Elderly care
- Financial gerontology
- Geriatrics
- Gerontotechnology
- Life extension
- List of life extension topics
- List of oldest people
- Narrative gerontology
- Old age
- Silver Alert
- Timeline of senescence research
