= Denham Harman Research Award =

The Denham Harman Research Award is a lifetime achievement award given by the American Aging Association to researchers who have given outstanding contributions to research on aging over the course of their careers.

== Past Recipients ==
Past recipients include Nathan Shock, Bruce Ames, Earl Stadtman, Caleb Finch, Arlan Richardson, Mark A. Smith, David Andrew Sinclair and George Perry.
