= Mark A. Smith =

American neuroscientist

Mark A. Smith FRCPath, FAAAS
- Born: August 15, 1965; Leicester, United Kingdom
- Died: December 19, 2010 (aged 45); Bainbridge Township, Geauga County, Ohio
- Citizenship: United States-British
- Education: Hatfield College, Durham University (B.Sc., 1986) and University of Nottingham (Ph.D., 1990)
- Known for: Discoveries concerning pathogenic mechanisms in Alzheimer's disease and other diseases
- Awards: Denham Harman Research Award, Fellow Royal College of Pathologists, Fellow American Aging Association, Fellow AAAS
- Scientific career
- Fields: Neurology, neuroscience, pathology
- Workplaces: Sandoz Forschungsinstitut (now Novartis), (1990–1992), Case Western Reserve University (1992–present)
- Doctoral advisor: Michael Landon, Ph.D
- Other academic advisors: George Perry, Ph.D.

Mark Anthony Smith (August 15, 1965 – December 19, 2010) was a professor of pathology at Case Western Reserve University in Cleveland, Ohio, where he also served as the director of basic science research at the University Memory and Aging Center. At the time of his death, he had been serving as executive director of the American Aging Association.

Smith served as editor-in-chief of Journal of Alzheimer's Disease and also sat on the editorial board of over 20 leading journals including Science Translational Medicine, Discovery Medicine, Journal of Neurochemistry, Journal of Pathology and The American Journal of Pathology. He is recognized in the field of Alzheimer's disease research particularly for his work on oxidative stress, mitochondria dysfunction and cell cycle re-entry and, with a h-index of 73 and over 800 peer-reviewed articles and reviews that have received over 21,000 citations, he was named as one of the top Alzheimer's disease researchers in the world, one of the top 100 most-cited scientists in Neuroscience & Behavior and one of the top 25 scientists in free radical research.

His many honors included the Jordi Folch-Pi Award from the American Society for Neurochemistry, the ASIP Outstanding Investigator Award from the American Society for Investigative Pathology and being elected as a Fellow of the Royal College of Pathologists, a Fellow of the American Aging Association, and a Fellow of American Association for the Advancement of Science, the world's largest scientific organization.

He had been awarded the Goudie Lecture & Medal of the Pathological Society but died before he could deliver the lecture.

== Biography ==
Mark A. Smith, son of John Smith (born 1936; underground coal miner Longwall mining) and Rita Joyce Smith (1935–2004; housewife), grew up in Wigston Magna, Leicester, where he attended Bushloe High School. After receiving a full scholarship (grant), he became the first in his family to attend university/college and, in 1986, received a B.Sc. with honors in Molecular Biology & Biochemistry from Durham University, and, in 1990, a Ph.D. in Biochemistry from the University of Nottingham. After a brief immersion in the pharmaceutical industry as a postdoctoral biochemist in the Division of Immunodermatology at Sandoz Forschungsinstitut (now Novartis) in Vienna, Austria, he began working in 1992 at Case Western Reserve University where he was one of the most prolific and the most cited faculty member on campus, numerically accounting for over 1% of publications and 4% of citations over the past years (data from Institute for Scientific Information).

Smith was struck by a motorist and killed on December 19, 2010.

== Research ==
The focus of the research undertaken by Smith's research involves investigating the pathological mechanism(s) underlying selective neuronal death in neurodegenerative diseases such as Alzheimer's disease. Further this research involves a variety of techniques including histology, state of the art molecular and cell biology and cellular and animal models of disease that are directed toward diagnostic, mechanistic, and therapeutic strategies. Current projects are directed towards 1) fundamental metabolic alterations; 2) homeostatic dysregulation of transition metals; 3) signal transduction alterations; and 4) inappropriate re-entry into the cell cycle.

Smith collaborated with and co-authored works with, amongst others, Drs. Rudolph J. Castellani Jr. and George Perry.

== Community service ==
Smith served on the professional advisory board of the Cleveland chapter of the Alzheimer's Association and was team captain of a group of local researchers ("A Cure From Cleveland") that participates in the annual fund raising Memory Walk for the Alzheimer's Association. In addition, Smith donated his time as a frequent guest speaker at local caregiver groups and at a variety of community events.
