= Dudley Lamming =

American pathologist specializing in aging

Dudley Lamming is an American pathologist and biomedical researcher. He is vice chair for biomedical research in the Department of Medicine at the University of Wisconsin-Madison and is co-director of the Wisconsin Nathan Shock Center of Excellence in the Basic Biology of Aging. He has served as the elected president of the American Aging Association and is an elected fellow of the AAA and the Gerontological Society of America

== Biography ==
Lamming attended the Massachusetts Institute of Technology in Cambridge, Massachusetts, where he received his bachelor's degree in nuclear engineering in 2000. From 2000-2002, he worked as an associate scientist at Enanta Pharmaceuticals. He then pursued a graduate degree in experimental pathology at Harvard University under the mentorship of David A. Sinclair, which he received in 2008. He continued until 2013 as a postdoc at the Whitehead Institute for Biomedical Research, working under David Sabatini, and established expertise in the regulation of metabolism and aging by the mTOR protein kinase. In 2014, Lamming joined the faculty of the University of Wisconsin-Madison in Madison, Wisconsin. In 2024, he was appointed vice chair for biomedical research in the Department of Medicine, and in 2025 co-founded the Wisconsin Nathan Shock Center with Professors Rozalyn Anderson and John Denu.

Lamming served from 2023-2024 as president of the American Aging Association, the largest scientific society devoted to the study of the biology of aging in the United States of America. He is an elected fellow of both the AAA and the Gerontological Society of America. From 2018-2025, Lamming served as associate editor of the Journals of Gerontology Biological Sciences, where he remains on the editorial board. In 2025, Lamming was elected as a member of the Academy for Health and Lifespan Research.
