= Matt Kaeberlein =

American biogerontologist

- Born: February 15, 1971 (age 55); Erie, Pennsylvania
- Education: Western Washington University; Massachusetts Institute of Technology
- Scientific career
- Workplaces: University of Washington
- Doctoral advisor: Leonard Guarente

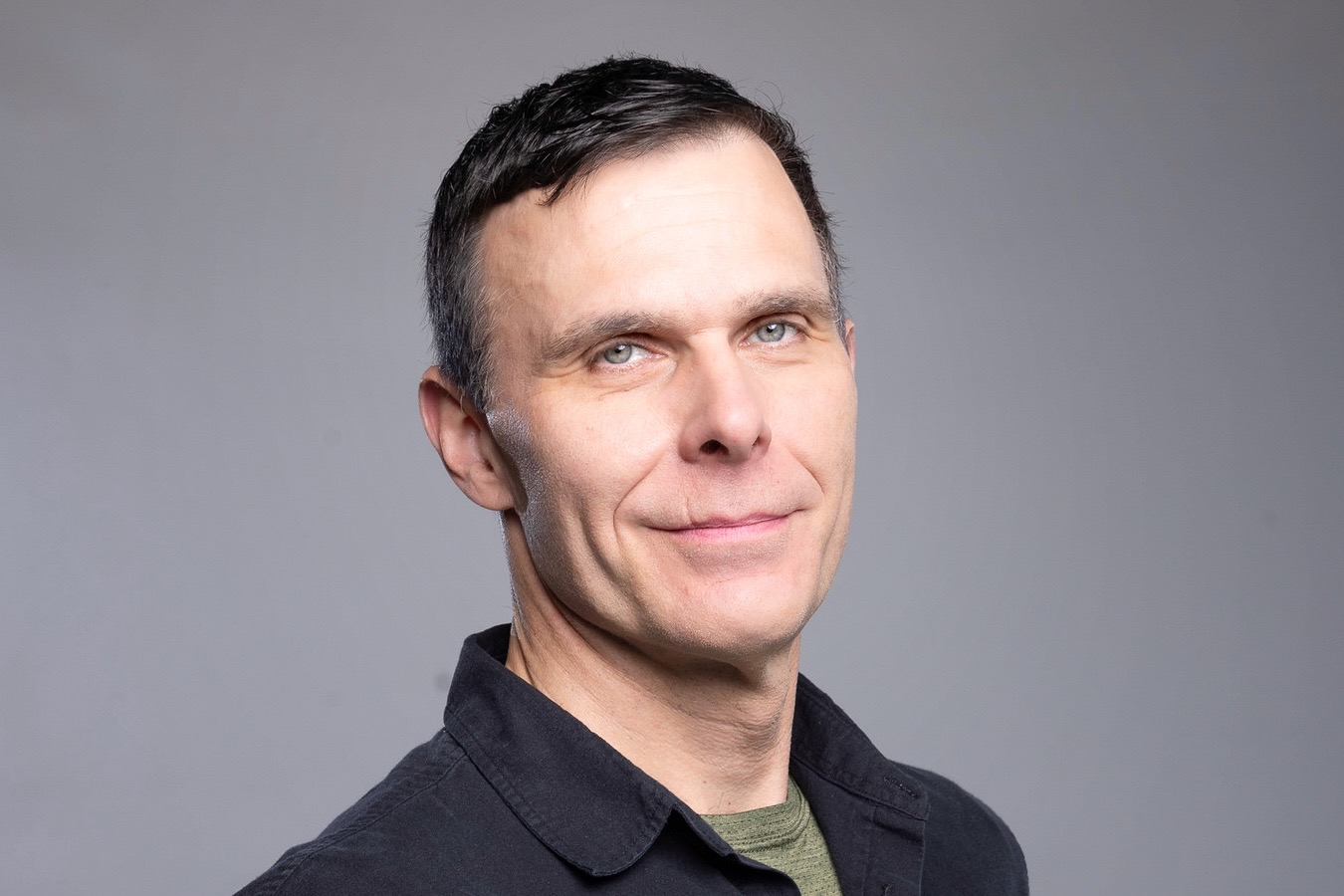
Matt Kaeberlein Headshot

Matt Kaeberlein (born 1971) is an American biologist and biogerontologist best known for his research on evolutionarily conserved mechanisms of aging. He is currently a professor of pathology at the University of Washington (UW) in Seattle.

== Education ==
Kaeberlein attended Western Washington University as an undergraduate and received a B.S. in biochemistry and a B.A. in mathematics in 1997. He received his Ph.D. in biology from MIT in 2002, advised by Leonard Guarente, and did his post-doctoral work with Stanley Fields in the Department of Genome Sciences at the University of Washington.

== Academic career ==
Kaeberlein became an assistant professor at UW in 2006, an associate professor in 2011, and a professor in 2015. He has received several awards for his work, including a Breakthroughs in Gerontology Award, an Alzheimer's Association New Investigator Award, and an Ellison Medical Foundation New Scholar in Aging Award. In 2011, he was named the Vincent Cristofalo Rising Star in Aging Research by the American Federation for Aging Research and appointed as a GSA Fellow. Kaeberlein was also recognized as an Undergraduate Research Mentor of the Year in 2010.

From 2009 - 2014, Kaeberlein was a distinguished visiting professor of biochemistry at the Aging Research Institute of Guangdong Medical College in Dongguan, China. He is also the co-director of the University of Washington Nathan Shock Center of Excellence in the Basic Biology of Aging, the director of SAGEWEB, and the founding director of the Healthy Aging and Longevity Research Institute at the University of Washington. He is also a co-director of the Dog Aging Project.

Kaeberlein has expressed the view that current advances in aging research could enable most people to potentially live to 100 or even 120 in good health.

== Honors and awards ==
- 2023 Puget Sound Business Journal, Healthcare Innovator of the Year
- 2020 Robert W. Kleemeier Award, Gerontological Society of America
- 2019 Nathan W. Shock Award, National Institute on Aging
- 2019 Parkin Award, Aging Mind and Brain Initiative, Iowa Neuroscience Institute
- 2019 Frontiers in Aging and Alzheimer’s Disease Pioneer Award
- 2017 Elected Fellow of the American Association for the Advancement of Science
- 2017 Elected Chair of the Biological Sciences Section of the Gerontological Society of America
- 2015 Elected President of the American Aging Association
- 2011 Selected as a Gerontological Society of America Fellow
- 2010 Vincent Cristofalo Rising Star in Aging Research Award
- 2010 Appointed co-director of the University of Washington Nathan Shock Center of Excellence in the Basic Biology of Aging
- 2009 Appointed distinguished visiting professor, Institute for Aging Research, Guangdong Medical College, Dongguan, China
- 2009 University of Washington Young Investigator Science in Medicine Lecture
- 2009 University of Washington Undergraduate Research Mentor Award
- 2008 New Scholar in Aging Award, The Ellison Medical Foundation
- 2008 Alzheimer's Association New Investigator Award
- 2007 Breakthroughs in Gerontology Award, American Federation for Aging Research and the Glenn Foundation
- 2006 American Federation for Aging Research Junior Faculty Research Award
