= Holly Brown-Borg =

American biologist and biogerontologist

Holly Brown-Borg is an American biologist and biogerontologist best known for her research on the regulation of lifespan by growth hormone. She is the Chester Fritz Distinguished Professor of Pharmacology, Physiology & Therapeutics at the University of North Dakota School of Medicine and Health Sciences.

== Education and training ==
Brown-Borg attended the University of Nebraska–Lincoln as an undergraduate, receiving a B.S. in agriculture and an M.S. in animal science. She performed her Ph.D. research at North Carolina State University, followed by postdoctoral research at the USDA Meat Animal Research Center and Southern Illinois University.

== Academic career ==
Brown-Borg joined the faculty of the University of North Dakota School of Medicine and Health Sciences in the Department of Pharmacology, Physiology & Therapeutics as an assistant professor in 1995 and was tenured as associate professor in 2002. In 2010, Brown-Borg was selected as a Chester Fritz Distinguished Professor, an endowed professorship established by Chester Fritz. She has received several awards for her work, including an Ellison Medical Foundation Senior Scholar Award and the Glenn Award for Research in Biological Mechanisms of Aging. Her contributions to the field of the biology of aging were recognized in 2013 by receipt of the Denham Harman Lifetime Achievement Research Award from the American Aging Association, the society's highest honor.

Brown-Borg is a leader in the field of aging. In 2010 served as president of the American Aging Association; she also has served as Chair of Biological Sciences section of Gerontological Society of America. Her contribution to aging and these societies have been recognized by her election as a Fellow of the Gerontological Society of America in 2006 and a Fellow of the American Aging Association in 2016.

In postdoctoral research completed by Brown-Borg in Andrzej Bartke's laboratory, Brown-Borg demonstrated that the Ames Dwarf mouse had a significant increase in lifespan. Brown-Borg's work has also linked growth hormone signaling to oxidative stress and methionine metabolism, and highlighted the role of growth hormone in the pro-longevity effects of methionine restriction.

== Honors and awards ==
- 2016 Elected Fellow of the American Aging Association
- 2013 American Aging Association Lifetime Achievement Denham Harman Research Award
- 2014 Chair, AFAR Research Grant for Junior Faculty Selection Committee
- 2013 Chair, AFAR Research Committee
- 2011 Chair of the Ellison/Postdoctoral Fellows Selection Committee
- 2011 Glenn Award for Research in Biological Mechanisms of Aging
- 2010-2011 President of the American Aging Association
- 2010 Appointed UND Chester Fritz Distinguished Professor
- 2009-2010 Chair of Biological Sciences section of Gerontological Society of America
- 2009 Senior Scholar Award, The Ellison Medical Foundation
- 2008 Glenn Award for Research in Biological Mechanisms of Aging
- 2006 Elected Fellow of the Gerontological Society of America

== Professional societies ==
- American Aging Association
- Gerontological Society of America
