= Heinrich Jasper (biologist) =

German-American biologist

Henri Jasper
- Heinrich Jasper
- Born: Germany
- Education: University of Tübingen
- Scientific career
- Fields: biology, aging, stem cells
- Workplaces: Buck Institute for Research on Aging
- Thesis: Analysis of signaling and cell differentiation events in Drosophila development by genome-wide expression profiling (2002)
- Doctoral advisor: Dr. Dirk Bohmann
- Website: www.buckinstitute.org/lab/jasper/

Heinrich "Henri" Jasper (born February 1, 1974) is a German-American biologist at Buck Institute for Research on Aging. He was formerly a professor of biology at The University of Rochester. He studies aging, stem cell function, and tissue regeneration.

== Biography ==
Jasper received his diploma in biochemistry sehr gut in December 1998 from the University of Tübingen, Germany. While there, he worked as a laboratory assistant in the laboratory of R.A.W. Rupp and wrote his diploma thesis on the 'Identification of target genes of the myogenic transcription factor MyoD in Xenopus laevis.' He was also a research student at the Max Planck Institutes of Biochemistry and Neurobiology in Munich, Germany. In October 2002, he received a PhD in Biology summa cum laude from the University of Heidelberg, Germany for his work at the European Molecular Biology Laboratory under Dr. Dirk Bohmann titled 'Analysis of signaling and cell differentiation events in Drosophila development by genome-wide expression profiling.'

After receiving his PhD, Jasper moved to the University of Rochester Medical Center, first as a researcher in the department of biomedical genetics, then as a tenured research professor at the department of biology. He has been at the Buck Institute since the summer of 2012 where he began a collaboration with the Kennedy and Kapahi labs to study the effects of stress, diet, and metabolic signaling on stem cell maintenance and regeneration.

From 2018-2019, Jasper served as President of the American Aging Association. He is a member of the Editorial Board for Current Biology.

== Honors and awards ==
- Glenn Foundation Award for Research in Biological Mechanisms of Aging (2010)
- Wilmot Assistant Professorship in Arts, Sciences and Engineering (2009)
- The Ellison Medical Foundation: Senior Scholar Award in Aging (2008)
