= Benjamin Miller (scientist) =

American gerontologist

Benjamin Miller is the Aging & Metabolism Research Program Chair at the Oklahoma Medical Research Foundation and holds the G.T. Blankenship Chair in Aging Research.

Miller attended the University of Wisconsin-Madison in Madison, Wisconsin, where he received his bachelor's and master's degrees in Kinesiology in 1995 and 1998, respectively. He then moved to the University of California Berkeley where he received his PhD in Integrative Biology in 2002. He continued as a postdoc at the University of Copenhagen, and in 2004 joined the faculty of the University of Auckland in New Zealand. Miller then moved to Colorado State University in 2007, where he eventually rose to full professorship and established expertise in measuring protein turnover using stable isotopes. In 2018, he moved to the Oklahoma Medical Research Foundation in Oklahoma City, Oklahoma. In 2025, he assumed the Chair of the Aging & Metabolism Research Program at the Oklahoma Medical Research Foundation.

Miller served from 2024 to 2025 as president of the American Aging Association, the largest scientific society devoted to the study of the biology of aging in the United States of America. Since 2020, Miller has served as associate editor of GeroScience, and from 2021-2024, Miller has served as associate editor of the Journals of Gerontology Biological Sciences, where he remains on the Editorial Board.

Miller's laboratory focuses on maintaining healthy skeletal muscle during aging, with a focus on protein turnover and mitochondria.
