= Peter Rheinstein =

American physician and lawyer (born 1943)

Peter Howard Rheinstein
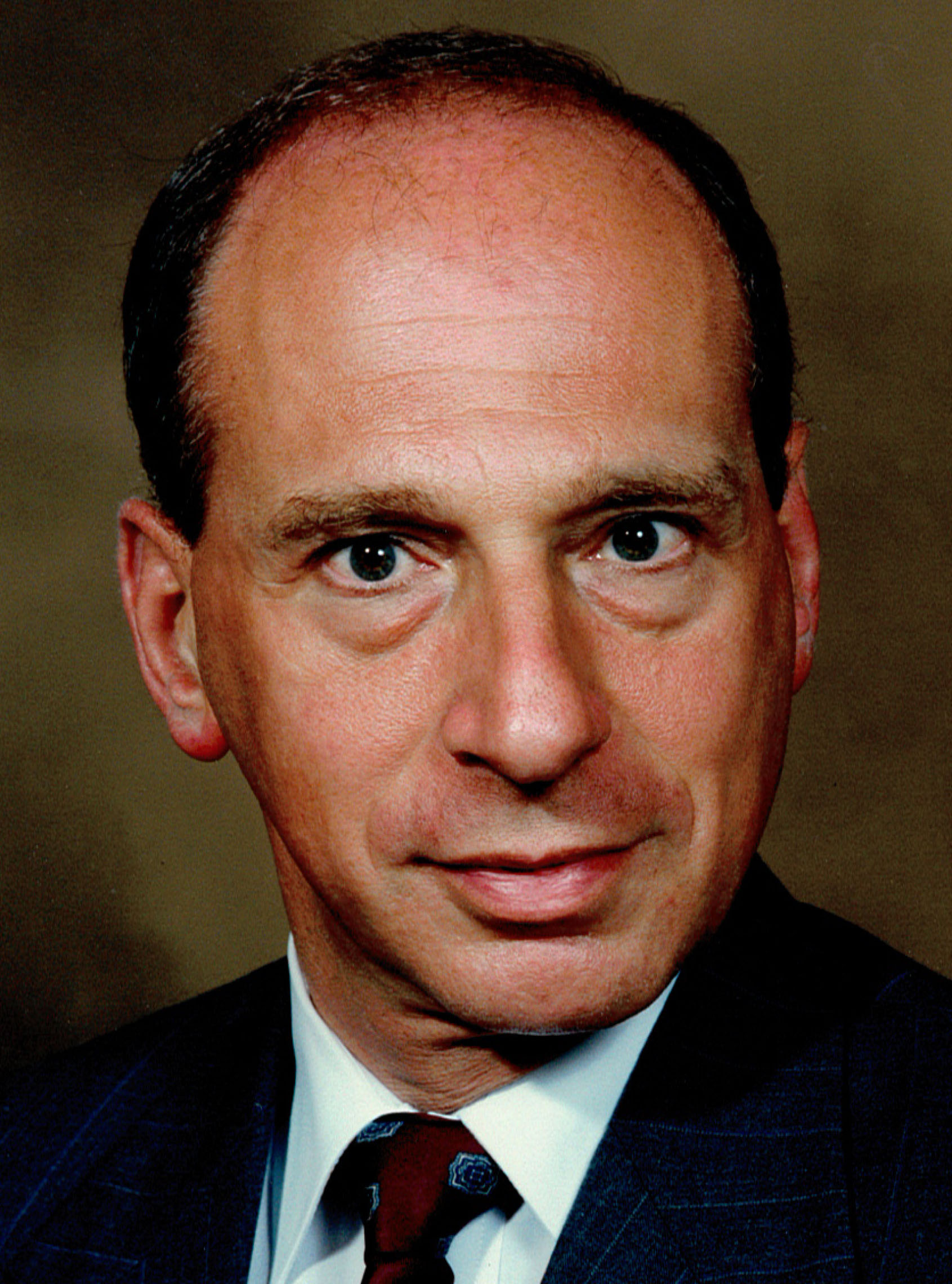
- Rheinstein in 1995
- Born: September 7, 1943 (age 82); Cleveland, Ohio, U.S.
- Education: Michigan State University (BA, MS); Johns Hopkins University (MD); University of Maryland School of Law (JD)
- Occupations: healthcare company executive, physician, lawyer
- Known for: regulation of prescription drug promotion
- Spouse: Miriam Rheinstein (m. 1969)
- Children: Jason Rheinstein
- Awards: Commendable Service award, Food and Drug Administration, 1981, Group award of merit, 1983, 1988, Group Commendable Service award, 1989, 1992—93, 1995, 1999, Commr.'s Special citation, 1993, American College of Legal Medicine Gold Medal (2003)

Peter Howard Rheinstein (born September 7, 1943) is an American physician, lawyer, author, and administrator (both private and governmental). He was an official of the Food and Drug Administration (FDA) from 1974 to 1999.

== Education ==
Rheinstein, a General Motors Scholar, received a B.A. with high honors from Michigan State University in 1963, an M.S. in mathematics from Michigan State University in 1964, an M.D. from Johns Hopkins University in 1967, and a J.D. from the University of Maryland School of Law in 1973. At Michigan State University, Rheinstein was noted for his facility in mathematics.

== Food and Drug Administration ==
Rheinstein was director of the Drug Advertising and Labeling Division, Food and Drug Administration, Rockville (1974-1982). He was acting deputy director Office of Drugs (1982–83), acting director Office of Drugs (1983–84), director Office of Drug Standards (1984–90), and director medicine staff Office Health Affairs (1990–99). While at the FDA, Rheinstein developed precedents for Food and Drug Administration regulation of prescription drug promotion, initiated FDA’s first patient medication information program, implemented the Drug Price Competition and Patent Term Restoration Act of 1984, and authored medication goals for Healthy People 2000 and 2010. Judy Woodruff interviewed Rheinstein about generic drug safety on the McNeil-Lehrer NewsHour on December 11, 1985. Stone Phillips interviewed Rheinstein about drug labeling on Dateline NBC on March 31, 1992.

== Later career ==
From 1999 to 2004, Rheinstein was senior vice president for medical and clinical affairs at Cell Works, Inc., in Baltimore. Among other projects, Cell Works wanted to develop a blood test for anthrax, similar to a system for cancer cells it produced. "It's something that companies like ours can incorporate into our diagnostic technology," Rheinstein told the Washington Times. Biodefense projects "create new technologies, the spin-offs of which can be commercialized into some pretty good things." In 2000 Rheinstein became president of Severn Health Solutions in Severna Park, Maryland. In 2010 Rheinstein was named president of the Academy of Physicians in Clinical Research and in 2011 was named chairman of the American Board of Legal Medicine. Rheinstein was named chairman of the United States Adopted Names Council in 2012. Rheinstein is a member of Phi Kappa Phi and vice president of the Intercultural Friends Foundation. Rheinstein is publisher of Discovery Medicine and chairman of MedData Foundation. He is past president of the Academy of Medicine of Washington, DC. Sarah Gonzalez interviewed Rheinstein for Planet Money, This Is Your Brain on Drug Ads, on September 8, 2021.

== Publications ==
- co-author of Human Organ Transplantation: Societal, Medical-Legal, Regulatory, and Reimbursement Issues. Health Administration Press, Ann Arbor, Michigan 1987.
- special editorial advisor, Good Housekeeping Guide to Medicines and Drugs, 1977–80
- member editorial board Legal Aspects Medical Practice, 1981–89
- member editorial board Drug Information Journal, 1982–86
- publisher of Discovery Medicine, 2001-
