= Gero (company) =

Biotechnology company applying physics and artificial intelligence to aging research

- Type: Private
- Industry: Biotechnology
- Founded: 2018
- Headquarters: Singapore
- Website: gero.ai

Gero is a privately held biotechnology company that develops a drug discovery platform combining artificial intelligence with a physics-based theory of aging originated and published by its co-founder, the physicist Peter Fedichev.

The platform identifies drug targets by analysing large-scale longitudinal human health data and distinguishing potentially reversible, disease-associated processes from the largely irreversible accumulation of damage associated with aging. The company has applied this approach both internally and in pharmaceutical collaborations, including those with Pfizer and Chugai Pharmaceutical, a member of the Roche Group.

In addition to the development of therapies against age-related diseases, the company proposed and pursues two new categories of interventions designed to slow aging processes themselves rather than reverse age-related damage. The company argues that such approaches may have a far greater impact on healthspan and lifespan than rejuvenation or cellular reprogramming strategies, which are more commonly pursued within the longevity field.

It was co-founded in 2018 by Fedichev and Max Kholin, and is based in Singapore with a San Francisco subsidiary. Gero operates at the preclinical research stage.

== History ==
Gero was founded in 2018 and emerged amid growing interest in the application of physics and AI to biomedical research and drug discovery. According to industry reporting, the company develops computational models intended to analyze aging-related disease processes using longitudinal human data rather than relying solely on traditional animal models.

In October 2023, Gero raised $6 million in a Series A extension funding round. Independent biotechnology industry publications reported that the funding was intended to support expansion of the company's AI platform and its research into aging and age-related diseases.

In July 2025, Gero appointed Brian K. Kennedy, a leading longevity researcher and former president of the Buck Institute for Research on Aging, to its board of directors.

On 17 June 2026, Gero announced $17 million in new financing, bringing the company's total equity funding to $34 million. The financing followed Gero's collaboration and licensing agreement with Chugai Pharmaceutical, a member of the Roche Group, which includes an upfront payment and up to $250 million in milestone payments in addition to royalties.

== Research and technology ==
Gero's research platform integrates ML, physics-informed modeling, and longitudinal human health datasets to study biological processes associated with aging and chronic disease.

The company's work focuses on identifying disease-associated biological pathways and potential therapeutic targets. As of the mid-2020s, Gero's research programs were reported to be in early discovery or preclinical stages.

According to the company, Gero's platform identifies drug targets by analysing large-scale longitudinal human data and distinguishing reversible, disease-associated processes from the largely irreversible accumulation of damage associated with aging. The company has cited this distinction as the basis for its 2023 target-discovery collaboration with Pfizer on fibrotic diseases and its 2025 research and license agreement with Chugai Pharmaceutical. Gero's published and preprint work argues that human aging reflects the accumulation of stochastic, thermodynamically irreversible changes, which the authors present as a fundamental constraint on rejuvenation and a rationale for stabilising rather than reversing aging.

In 2023, Gero reported using a quantum-computing device within a workflow for generating synthetically feasible, drug-like molecular structures.

In June 2025, Gero released ProtoBind-Diff, a diffusion-based machine-learning model that proposes candidate small-molecule binders for a protein target from its amino-acid sequence alone, without requiring an experimentally determined three-dimensional structure. The company reported training the model on more than one million protein–ligand pairs and released its model weights publicly. Gero researchers also described HARVEST, a multi-agent large language model pipeline built to extract structured bioactivity data from pharmaceutical patents; in a 2026 preprint the authors reported applying it to roughly 165,000 patents to generate millions of activity records, including protein targets absent from existing public databases.

== Collaborations ==
=== Pfizer collaboration ===
In January 2023, Gero entered into a research collaboration with Pfizer to apply its computational platform to the identification of potential therapeutic targets for fibrotic diseases.

=== Chugai Pharmaceutical (Roche Group) partnership ===
In July 2025, Gero entered into a joint research and license agreement with Chugai Pharmaceutical Co., Ltd., a Japanese pharmaceutical company majority owned by Roche. The agreement focused on the development of antibody-based therapies for age-related diseases and included potential milestone and royalty payments of up to $250 million.

== Reception ==
Gero has been covered by biotechnology and longevity-focused industry publications in the context of broader investment and research trends involving artificial intelligence and aging science. Commentators have cited the company's funding activity and pharmaceutical collaborations as examples of increasing interest in AI-assisted approaches to drug discovery for age-related conditions.

A 2021 study by Gero, led by co-founder Peter Fedichev and published in Nature Communications, attracted renewed attention in 2025 after a hot-microphone exchange in which Chinese leader Xi Jinping told Russian president Vladimir Putin that people might live to 150 this century. An analysis by the news outlet Meduza suggested Xi's remark likely traced to the paper, which it characterized as having become a common reference point for such forecasts, while noting that media coverage tended to drop the study's lower bound of 120 years.

In June 2026, Gero was named a World Economic Forum (WEF) Technology Pioneer, becoming part of the Forum's 2026 cohort of 100 companies recognized for developing technologies with the potential to significantly impact business and society. The company was recognized for its physics-based approach to aging research and AI-driven drug discovery platform, which combines large-scale human longitudinal data, machine learning, and principles from statistical physics to identify therapeutic targets for age-related diseases.
