= Ellen Idler =

American sociologist

Academic background
- Education: College of Wooster; Rutgers University; Yale University

Academic work
- Discipline: Sociology of health Sociology of religion Gerontology
- Institutions: Emory University; Rutgers University

Ellen L. Idler is an American sociologist. She is the Samuel Candler Dobbs Professor of Sociology at Emory University and director of Emory's Religion and Public Health Collaborative. She previously taught at Rutgers University, where she chaired the Department of Sociology.

Idler's 1997 article with Yael Benyamini, "Self-Rated Health and Mortality: A Review of Twenty-Seven Community Studies", reviewed longitudinal studies examining global self-ratings of health as predictors of mortality.

== Early life and education ==
Idler earned a B.A. with honors in sociology from the College of Wooster in 1974. From 1974 to 1975, she was a Rockefeller Brothers Fellow at Union Theological Seminary in New York.

She received an M.A. in sociology from Rutgers University in 1976, where she was advised by Peter L. Berger. She attended Yale University, earning an M.Phil. in 1982 and a Ph.D. in sociology in 1985.

== Career ==
Idler joined the faculty of Rutgers University in 1985 as an assistant professor of sociology and a core faculty member of the Institute for Health, Health Care Policy, and Aging Research. She was promoted to associate professor in 1991 and professor in 1998. She served as undergraduate director and chaired the Department of Sociology from 2000 to 2006. In 2007–2008, she was acting dean for Social and Behavioral Sciences in the School of Arts and Sciences. In 1999, she was a visiting professor at the Institute of Public Health at the University of Copenhagen.

In 2009, Idler joined Emory University as the Samuel Candler Dobbs Professor of Sociology and founding director of the Religion and Public Health Collaborative. At Emory, she has held affiliated appointments in the Department of Epidemiology at the Rollins School of Public Health, the Center for Ethics, and the Graduate Division of Religion. She served as director of graduate studies for the Department of Sociology from 2017 to 2022.

Idler has served on the editorial boards of the Journal of Health and Social Behavior, American Journal of Sociology, Journal of Gerontology: Social Sciences, and Journal of Aging and Health, and as an academic editor for PLOS ONE and PLOS Aging and Health.

She chaired the Aging and the Life Course section of the American Sociological Association from 2012 to 2015 and the Behavioral and Social Sciences Section of the Gerontological Society of America from 2007 to 2010.

== Research ==
Idler's research has addressed the relationship between health, aging, religion, and social relationships. Her work on self-rated health has examined whether individuals' assessments of their own health predict mortality and functional decline. Studies in this area have used longitudinal datasets including the Established Populations for Epidemiologic Studies of the Elderly (EPESE), National Health and Nutrition Examination Survey I Epidemiologic Follow-up Study (NHEFS), Panel Study of Income Dynamics (PSID), and National Health Interview Survey (NHIS).

In a 2017 study using the Health and Retirement Study, Idler and colleagues examined religious participation as a predictor of mortality alongside socioeconomic and health-related factors.

In 2014, Idler edited Religion as a Social Determinant of Public Health, published by Oxford University Press. The book examines the relationship between religious institutions and public health and considers religion within the broader social determinants of health framework.

In 2023, Idler, Mohamed F. Jalloh, James Cochrane, and John Blevins published an analysis in the BMJ examining religion as a social force in health and discussing the complexities and potentially contrasting effects of religious institutions and practices on health.

== Selected publications ==
=== Books ===
- Idler, Ellen L., ed. (2014). Religion as a Social Determinant of Public Health. New York: Oxford University Press.
- Idler, Ellen L. (1994). Cohesiveness and Coherence: Religion and the Health of the Elderly. New York: Garland.

=== Journal articles ===
- Idler, Ellen L., and Yael Benyamini (1997). "Self-Rated Health and Mortality: A Review of Twenty-Seven Community Studies." Journal of Health and Social Behavior 38 (1): 21–37.
- Idler, Ellen L., and Stanislav Kasl (1992). "Religion, Disability, Depression and the Timing of Death." American Journal of Sociology 97: 1052–1079.
- Idler, Ellen, John Blevins, Mimi Kiser, and Carol Hogue (2017). "Religion, a Social Determinant of Mortality? A 10-Year Follow-Up of the Health and Retirement Study." PLOS ONE 12 (12): e0189134.
- Idler, Ellen, Mohamed F. Jalloh, James Cochrane, and John Blevins (2023). "Religion as a Social Force in Health: Complexities and Contradictions." BMJ 382: e076817.

== Awards and honors ==
- Matilda White Riley Distinguished Scholar Award, American Sociological Association Section on Aging and the Life Course (2020)
- Samuel Candler Dobbs Chair in Sociology, Emory University (2013)
- Fellow of the Gerontological Society of America (2001)
- John Templeton Foundation Exemplary Papers Prize for Outstanding Paper in Religion and the Behavioral Sciences (1998)
- Member of the Sociological Research Association (2007)
