= Christian Sell =

American scientist

- Education: State University of New York at Binghampton
- Known for: aging
- Scientific career
- Workplaces: Drexel University College of Medicine and Albany Medical College
- Website: drexel.edu/medicine/faculty/profiles/christian-sell/

Christian Sell is an American scientist who works as an associate professor in the department of biochemistry and molecular biology at the Drexel University College of Medicine.

== Education and career ==
Sell attended the State University of New York at Binghampton, and received his bachelor's degree in biology in 1982. He then moved to Albany Medical College, where he received his PhD in pathology in 1990. He then continued his research career as a postdoctoral researcher, first at Temple University and then at Thomas Jefferson University. Finally, he joined the Medical College of Pennsylvania as an assistant professor in 1994. He moved to the Lankenau Institute for Medical Research as an associate investigator in 1998, and since 2005 has been a tenured associate professor at the Drexel University College of Medicine.

From 2017 to 2018 Sell served as president of the American Aging Association, the largest scientific society devoted to the study of the biology of aging in the United States of America. In 2018, he was elected as a Fellow of the Gerontological Society of America. Since 2019, Sell has served as an associate editor of GeroScience, and from 2016 to 2020 he served as Editor-in-chief of Frontiers in Endocrinology; Endocrinology of Aging.

== Research focus ==
Sell's laboratory focuses on the role of the mTOR protein kinase in cellular senescence, and in 2019 his research group showed that the mTOR inhibitor rapamycin can extend the lifespan of human cells and decrease the appearance of aged cells in human skin.
