= List of lifetime achievement awards =

Lifetime achievement awards are awarded by various organizations, to recognize contributions over the whole of a career, rather than or in addition to single contributions.

Such awards, and organizations presenting them, include:

== A ==
- A.C. Redfield Lifetime Achievement Award
- Academy Honorary Award
- Acharius Medal
- ACUM Award
- AFI Life Achievement Award
- Áillohaš Music Award
- American Society of Landscape Architects Medal
- Anisfield-Wolf Book Awards
- ANR National Award
- Asianet Film Awards

== B ==
- BBC Jazz Awards
- BBC Sports Personality of the Year Lifetime Achievement Award
- BBC Radio 2 Folk Awards
- BBC Sports Personality of the Year
- BET Awards
- Billboard Latin Music Lifetime Achievement Award
- Bram Stoker Award for Lifetime Achievement
- Brit Award for Outstanding Contribution to Music
- British Academy Television Awards
- British Comedy Awards
- Buck O'Neil Lifetime Achievement Award

== C ==
- Canadian Music Hall of Fame
- Carol Burnett Award for Achievement in Television
- Chicago International Film Festival
- Christopher Brennan Award
- C. K. Nayudu Lifetime Achievement Award
- Council of Fashion Designers of America
- Covenant Awards
- CTBUH Skyscraper Award
- Premio Cuervo Tradicional

== D ==
- Dadasaheb Phalke Award
- Daytime Emmy Award
- Dawn Breakers International Film Festival
- Denham Harman Research Award
- Detektor Master 456 squids
- Dhyan Chand Award for Lifetime Achievement in Sports and Games
- Disney Legend Award
- Donostia Award
- Down Beat Lifetime Achievement Award
- Dr. Rajkumar Award

== E ==
- Earle Grey Award
- Emmy Award
- Enrico Fermi Award

== F ==
- Filipino Academy of Movie Arts and Sciences Award
- Filmfare Lifetime Achievement Award
- Filmfare Lifetime Achievement Award (South)
- Folksbiene National Yiddish Theatre

== G ==
- GMA Canada
- GMA Canada Lifetime Achievement Award
- Gawad Urian Lifetime Achievement Award
- Game Developers Choice Awards
- General Administration of Sport of China | All-China Youth Federation
- Gershwin Prize
- Golden Globe Cecil B. DeMille Award
- Golden Lion for Lifetime Achievement
- Golden Pen Lifetime Achievement Award
- Governor General's Awards
- Grammy Lifetime Achievement Award
- Gumshoe Awards

== H ==
- Hong Kong Film Award for Lifetime Achievement
- Humboldt Prize

== I ==
- IIFA Lifetime Achievement Award
- Indspire Awards
- International Sculpture Center
- International Clarinet Association Honorary Membership
- International League Against Epilepsy
- International Primatological Society IPS Lifetime Achievement Award
- Internet Hall of Fame
- Israeli Artists' Association lifetime achievement award
- IEEE Lifetime achievement award
- IEEE Standards Association Lifetime achievement award

== J ==
- J. C. Daniel Award
- Jim Thorpe Lifetime Achievement Award
- John Bunn Award
- John Muir Lifetime Achievement Award

== K ==
- Kennedy Center Honors
- Kerala State Film Award for Lifetime Achievement
- Kluge Prize

== L ==
- Lannan Literary Awards
- Latin Grammy Lifetime Achievement Award
- Lemelson–MIT Prize
- Lifetime Achievement Emmy
- Leroy P. Steele Prize
- Lo Nuestro Excellence Award
- List of Israel Prize recipients
- List of Grammy Award categories
- List of National Hockey League awards
- Longford Lyell Award
- Lux Style Award

== M ==
- MAC Awards
- Margaret Collier Award
- MTV Movie Awards
- MTV Video Vanguard Award

== N ==
- NTR National Award
- NAACP Theatre Award – Lifetime Achievement Award
- National Air and Space Museum Trophy
- National Television Award for Special Recognition
- NBA Lifetime Achievement Award
- Nigar Awards
- Nuclear-Free Future Award

== O ==
- Oscar Hammerstein Award

== P ==
- Paul "Bear" Bryant Award
- PEN/ESPN Lifetime Achievement Award for Literary Sports Writing
- Pennsylvania NewsMedia Association#Awards
- PGA Tour Lifetime Achievement Award
- Photographic Society of America
- Pilgrim Award
- Positive Coaching Alliance
- Pride of Britain Awards
- PWI Stanley Weston Award

== R ==
- Raghupathi Venkaiah Award
- Retail Council of Canada

== S ==
- Sidney Kobre Award for Lifetime Achievement in Journalism History
- Slobodan Piva Ivković Award for Lifetime Achievement
- Society for Developmental Biology (SDB)
- Special Tony Award
- Sports Lifetime Achievement Award
- Star Awards for Special Achievement Award
- Star Screen Lifetime Achievement Award
- Stardust Award for Lifetime Achievement

== T ==
- Themed Entertainment Association
- Truman Capote Award for Literary Criticism

== U ==
- USENIX

== W ==
- Willie Nelson Lifetime Achievement Award
- World Fantasy Award for Life Achievement
- World Soundtrack Award – Lifetime Achievement

== Y ==
- Young Artist Former Child Star Lifetime Achievement Award

== Z ==
- Zee Cine Award for Lifetime Achievement
