= Stanley Fields =

Stanley Fields may refer to:

- Stanley Fields (actor) (1883–1941), American actor
- Stanley Fields (biologist) (born 1955), American biologist
- Stanley Fields (soldier) (born c. 1919), Canadian Second World War soldier made a knight of the Légion d'Honneur – see List of foreign recipients of the Légion d'Honneur by country
