= Holly Van Remmen =

American scientist

- Education: Eastern Illinois University and University of Texas Health Science Center, San Antonio
- Known for: aging
- Scientific career
- Workplaces: Oklahoma Medical Research Foundation and University of Texas Health Science Center, San Antonio
- Website: omrf.org/research-faculty/scientists/van-remmen-holly/

Holly Van Remmen is the Aging & Metabolism Research Program Chair at the Oklahoma Medical Research Foundation and holds the G.T. Blankenship Chair in Aging Research.

Van Remmen attended Eastern Illinois University in Charleston, Illinois, and received her bachelor's degree in zoology in 1983. She then moved to the University of Texas Health Science Center San Antonio where she received her Ph.D. in physiology in 1991. She continued as a postdoc at the University of Texas Health Science Center San Antonio under the mentorship of Arlan Richardson, and joined the faculty as an assistant professor in 1995. She earned tenure at the University of Texas Health Science Center San Antonio and was promoted to tenured full professor in 2011. In 2013, she moved to the Oklahoma Medical Research Foundation in Oklahoma City, Oklahoma. In 2016, she assumed the Chair of the Aging & Metabolism Research Program at the Oklahoma Medical Research Foundation.

Van Remmen has twice (2005-2006 and 2022-2023) served as President of the American Aging Association, the largest scientific society devoted to the study of the biology of aging in the United States of America. In 2021-2022, she served as President of the Society for Redox Biology and Medicine. From 2014-2019, she served as editor of the journal Redox Biology, and she remains on the editorial board. Since 2014, Van Remmen has served as associate editor of the Journals of Gerontology Biological Sciences.

Van Remmen's laboratory focuses on the role of oxidative stress in modulating the relationship between motor neurons and skeletal muscle in sarcopenia and on interventions to delay or reduce sarcopenia.
