= Stanley Fields (biologist) =

American biologist

Stan Fields
- Born: Stanley Fields
- Education: University of Cambridge
- Known for: Two-hybrid screening
- Scientific career
- Workplaces: Laboratory of Molecular Biology; Howard Hughes Medical Institute; University of Washington
- Thesis: Sequence analysis of influenza virus RNA (1981)
- Website: depts.washington.edu/sfields; www.gs.washington.edu/faculty/fields.htm; www.hhmi.org/research/investigators/fields.html

Stanley Fields is an American biologist best known for developing the yeast two hybrid method for identifying protein–protein interactions. He is currently a professor of Genome Sciences at the University of Washington and Howard Hughes Medical Institute Investigator, and previously served as chair of the Department of Genome Sciences.

== Education ==
Fields was educated at the University of Cambridge where he was awarded a Doctor of Philosophy in 1981 for research carried out in the Laboratory of Molecular Biology with Greg Winter and George Brownlee.

== Research ==
Fields developed the yeast two-hybrid system in 1989, which has been widely used by Fields and others to identify protein-protein interactions in various organisms and biological contexts.

Along with Matt Kaeberlein and Brian Kennedy, in later work Fields has carried out genome-wide screens for aging genes in yeast. Kaeberlein and co-workers have questioned the hypothesis that lifespan extension from caloric restriction is mediated by Sirtuins. Instead Kaeberlein, Fields, and Kennedy have proposed that caloric restriction increases lifespan by decreasing the activity of the Target of Rapamycin (TOR) kinase.

== Honors and awards ==
- 2003 Jacob Heskel Gabbay Award in Biotechnology and Medicine (jointly with Roger Brent)
