= George Perry (neuroscientist) =

American neuroscientist (born 1953)

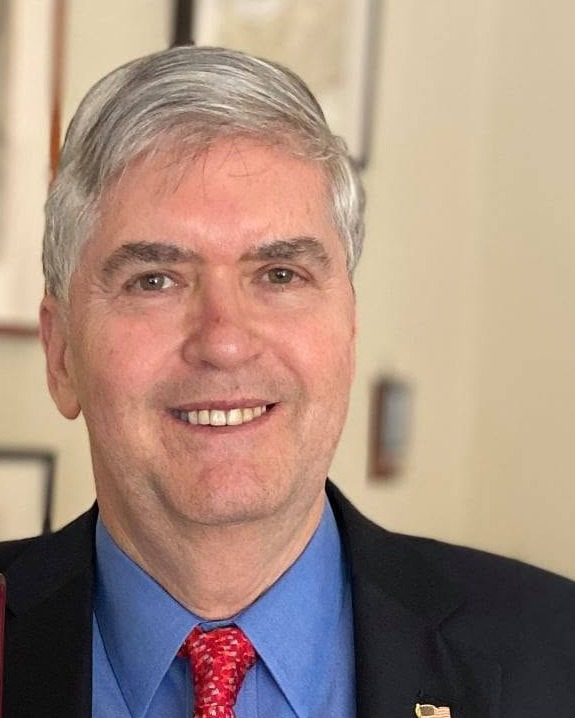
- Perry in 2021
- Born: April 12, 1953 (age 73); Lompoc, California, U.S.
- Education: Allan Hancock College; University of California, Santa Barbara (BA); Scripps Institution of Oceanography, University of California, San Diego (PhD)
- Known for: Oxidative stress research in Alzheimer's disease; RNA oxidation in neurodegeneration; amyloid-β protective hypothesis; founding editor-in-chief, Journal of Alzheimer's Disease
- Scientific career
- Fields: Neuroscience, neuropathology, cell biology, Alzheimer's disease
- Workplaces: Case Western Reserve University; University of Texas at San Antonio
- Doctoral advisor: David Epel

George Perry (born April 12, 1953) is an American neuroscientist known for research on oxidative stress in Alzheimer's disease and for proposing the amyloid-β protective hypothesis, an alternative to the amyloid cascade theory of the disease. Through a series of papers beginning in the 1990s, Perry and his collaborators reported that oxidative damage to vulnerable neurons precedes the deposition of amyloid plaques and neurofibrillary tangles, and on this basis he has argued that amyloid-β deposition is a downstream antioxidant response rather than the primary cause of the disease.

Perry has authored more than 1,000 peer-reviewed publications; as of 2026, Google Scholar records more than 140,000 citations to his work. He is the founding editor-in-chief of the Journal of Alzheimer's Disease (since 1998) and of its companion title Journal of Alzheimer's Disease Reports.

Perry holds the Semmes Foundation Distinguished University Chair in Neurobiology at the University of Texas at San Antonio (UTSA), where he is professor of biology, chemistry, and neuroscience, developmental and regenerative biology. He served as dean of the UTSA College of Sciences from 2006 to 2018; earlier he was a faculty member at Case Western Reserve University, which he joined in 1982 and where he retains an adjunct appointment. He is a Fellow of the American Association for the Advancement of Science and a foreign corresponding member of the Royal Spanish Academy of Sciences, the Mexican Academy of Sciences, and the Academy of Sciences of Lisbon.

== Early life and education ==
Perry was born on April 12, 1953, in Lompoc, California, and was raised on the Cojo Ranch at Point Conception in western Santa Barbara County until the age of eight, when the family moved to a home on Jalama Road. He has credited this coastal landscape, and his father's encouragement, with sparking his early interest in the natural sciences.

Perry is of Azorean Portuguese descent; his grandparents emigrated from the islands of Santa Maria and Pico, and the family's history is profiled in Untamed Dreams – Faces of America, a volume on the Portuguese community of California. He helped found the National Organization of Portuguese Americans, has served as a reviewer for Portugal's Foundation for Science and Technology, and since 2018 has served on the Council of the Portuguese Diaspora, coordinating its U.S. (West) regional group.

Perry graduated from Lompoc Senior High School in 1971, from Allan Hancock College in 1973, and earned a B.A. with high honors in zoology from the University of California, Santa Barbara in 1974. He married in 1983 and has two daughters.

== Doctoral and postdoctoral training ==
Perry received his Ph.D. in marine biology in 1979 from the Scripps Institution of Oceanography, University of California, San Diego, under the supervision of cell biologist David Epel, including two years of research at Stanford's Hopkins Marine Station and summer research at the Marine Biological Laboratory in Woods Hole. His doctoral work characterized a calcium-stimulated lipid peroxidizing system in the sea urchin egg, beginning a research interest in oxidative biology that he later carried into neurodegeneration. He was a Muscular Dystrophy Association postdoctoral fellow at Baylor College of Medicine in the laboratories of B. R. Brinkley and Joseph Bryan from 1979 to 1982, where he extended his work on the cytoskeleton.

== Academic career ==
Perry joined the faculty of Case Western Reserve University in Cleveland, Ohio, in 1982, where he became professor of pathology and neurosciences and served as interim chair of pathology. He retains an adjunct professorship at Case Western Reserve.

In 2006 he moved to UTSA as dean of the College of Sciences, a role he held until 2018. He has held the Semmes Foundation Endowed Chair in Neurobiology since 2013 (renamed Distinguished University Chair in 2015) and has been professor of neuroscience, developmental and regenerative biology at UTSA since 2021.

== Research ==
Perry's research has focused on the role of oxidative stress in Alzheimer's disease. Over three decades, he and his collaborators studied oxidative damage to neurons and its timing relative to the disease's classical lesions, work on which Perry based his proposal that amyloid-β deposition is an antioxidant response to the disease rather than its cause — a position he terms the amyloid-β protective hypothesis.

=== Oxidative stress in Alzheimer's disease ===
Beginning in the early 1990s, Perry, his longtime collaborator Mark A. Smith, and an international group of co-authors reported that vulnerable neurons in Alzheimer's disease show widespread oxidative damage to lipids, proteins, and nucleic acids. Their 1996 paper in Nature, "Oxidative damage in Alzheimer's," and a 1997 paper in the Journal of Neuroscience on widespread peroxynitrite-mediated damage helped establish oxidative stress as a feature of the disease. In 1999, the group reported that RNA, alongside DNA and protein, is a major target of oxidation in vulnerable neurons, with markedly elevated 8-hydroxyguanosine consistent with a mitochondrial source of reactive oxygen species; Perry and Akihiko Nunomura later extended this framework to oxidation of microRNAs.

A 2001 paper led by Nunomura with Perry as senior author, drawing on preclinical and Down-syndrome cases, argued that markers of oxidative damage precede the deposition of amyloid plaques and neurofibrillary tangles. Perry has cited this work, which he interprets as showing that oxidative damage is the earliest detectable abnormality in the disease, as the empirical basis for his subsequent reinterpretation of the role of amyloid.

=== The amyloid-β protective hypothesis ===
Perry and his collaborators reported that levels of neuronal oxidative damage are inversely correlated with amyloid-β burden in the same anatomical regions — across sporadic Alzheimer's, familial Alzheimer's, and Down syndrome — which Perry interprets as indicating that amyloid-β deposition accompanies a reduction in oxidative stress rather than causing the disease. Mechanistic studies reported that amyloid-β has a copper-binding site that blocks copper-catalyzed lipid peroxidation, and that magnetite particles within senile plaque cores represent sequestered redox-active iron. Together with studies of mitochondrial abnormalities, this work led Perry to propose the amyloid-β protective hypothesis: that amyloid-β deposition is a downstream antioxidant response to neuronal oxidative stress, rather than the primary cause of the disease.

Perry has cited as further support the conservation of amyloid-β across mammals with well-developed brains and the strict biochemical conservation of its sequence, arguing that biology would not maintain so widely conserved a response without adaptive value. He has also argued that the genetic evidence linking amyloid-β to Alzheimer's disease, including familial mutations and transgenic mouse models, is correlational rather than causal.

=== Clinical implications ===
The amyloid-β protective hypothesis predicts that therapies designed to remove amyloid-β from the brain will not arrest or reverse Alzheimer's disease — a prediction Perry has restated as the field's record of amyloid-removal trials has accumulated. He has argued that the repeated failure of these trials, and the limited clinical benefit of approved anti-amyloid therapies, are consistent with this view. Perry's research has been supported by the U.S. National Institutes of Health since the 1980s, the Alzheimer's Association, the Kleberg Foundation, and the Semmes Foundation.

=== Trainees and collaborators ===
Perry has trained and mentored researchers in Alzheimer's disease; in 2010 he received the Distinguished Research Mentor Award of the Society for Advancement of Chicanos/Hispanics and Native Americans in Science (SACNAS). Mark A. Smith (1965–2010) joined Perry's laboratory at Case Western Reserve University in 1992 and became professor of pathology at CWRU and co-editor-in-chief of the Journal of Alzheimer's Disease before his death in a hit-and-run accident in December 2010. Paula I. Moreira, who completed her doctoral training under Perry's mentorship at the University of Coimbra in 2007, is associate professor of physiology at the Faculty of Medicine, University of Coimbra, and in 2024 joined Perry as co-editor-in-chief of the Journal of Alzheimer's Disease. Long-term collaborators include Akihiko Nunomura, senior co-author on the 1999 RNA oxidation, 2001 "earliest event," and 2020 microRNA papers; Xiongwei Zhu and Lawrence M. Sayre of Case Western Reserve University; Hyoung-gon Lee of UTSA; and Rudolph J. Castellani of Northwestern University, co-author of Perry's 2014 textbook Molecular Pathology of Alzheimer's Disease and of published critiques of the amyloid cascade hypothesis.

== Scientific reception ==
The amyloid cascade hypothesis, articulated by John Hardy and Gerald Higgins in 1992, became the dominant framework for understanding Alzheimer's disease and the basis for most therapeutic development over the following three decades. Proponents of the cascade hypothesis have continued to defend it: in a 2016 review marking the hypothesis's 25th anniversary, Dennis Selkoe and John Hardy argued that an imbalance between the production and clearance of amyloid-β is an early, often initiating factor in Alzheimer's disease, and that amyloid-β remains the most extensively validated therapeutic target. Published reviews of the resulting debate have described Perry's amyloid-β protective hypothesis as among the alternatives proposed to the cascade view, and Perry himself as one of its sustained critics. In a 2018 Nature Outlook feature on alternatives to the amyloid hypothesis, Perry summarized his position by contrasting it with the prevailing view: where conventional research treated amyloid-β as harmful, he proposed that its accumulation is a protective response to age-related metabolic and oxidative stress. He has characterized Alzheimer's disease as multifactorial, arguing that the field has pursued a common pathogenesis when the observed pathology may instead reflect a common response. At the 2017 annual meeting of the American Academy of Neurology, Perry debated the amyloid-cascade proponent Reisa Sperling of Harvard Medical School on whether removing amyloid plaques could improve cognition; the moderator scored the debate in Perry's favor on an audience show of hands.

Skepticism toward the cascade hypothesis has grown alongside the clinical record of amyloid-removal therapies. Three anti-amyloid antibodies have received U.S. Food and Drug Administration approval — aducanumab (2021), lecanemab (2023), and donanemab (2024) — each reducing brain amyloid but producing modest cognitive benefits and carrying risks of amyloid-related imaging abnormalities, including brain swelling and hemorrhage. Aducanumab was widely rejected by clinicians and refused marketing authorization by the European Medicines Agency; the EMA also initially rejected lecanemab in 2024. Perry, quoted by KFF Health News on the lecanemab approval, argued that amyloid accumulation in aging brains plays a preserving rather than destructive role, and that the modest benefit and serious side-effect profile of amyloid-clearance therapies are consistent with his protective hypothesis. At the time of aducanumab's 2021 approval he voiced similar skepticism, telling the San Antonio Report that he would not advise a family member to take the drug, citing its risk–benefit ratio and the unproven premise that removing amyloid improves cognition.

In 2022, an investigation in Science raised concerns about apparent image manipulation in a 2006 Nature paper by Sylvain Lesné and Karen Ashe that had identified Aβ*56 as a toxic amyloid oligomer responsible for memory loss in mouse models; the paper, among the most-cited Alzheimer's papers of the 21st century, was retracted in 2024. Some Alzheimer's researchers stated in the wake of the investigation that they had long doubted the central role of amyloid in the disease, while others maintained that the cascade hypothesis remained viable. In a 2023 book-length history of Alzheimer's disease research, the biochemist Christian Behl situated Perry's work — including his and Mark Smith's proposals that the disease reflects disturbances of proteolysis and that amyloid-β deposits represent protective adaptations — within the longer history of substantive critiques of the amyloid cascade hypothesis. A 2026 World Report in The Lancet on the divergent regulatory decisions over anti-amyloid drugs presented Perry among researchers who question the amyloid hypothesis, quoting him that the disease remains poorly understood despite extensive research and that a cure will not be found without a better understanding of it; he also argued that the concentration of research funding on amyloid has crowded out alternative approaches. The same report quoted researchers who defend the therapies, including Randall Bateman, who maintained that the clinical benefits are significant and greater the earlier patients are treated, and Rudolph Tanzi, who attributed past trial failures to treating the disease too late. Charles Piller's 2025 book Doctored, an investigation into research-integrity problems in Alzheimer's science, profiles Perry as a prominent, long-standing critic of the amyloid hypothesis.

== Editorial work ==
Perry is the founding editor-in-chief of the Journal of Alzheimer's Disease (since 1998) and Journal of Alzheimer's Disease Reports. The journal presents the annual Mark A. Smith Alzheimer Award, named after Perry's longtime collaborator who died in 2010.

In his capacity as the journal's editor, Perry has been quoted commenting on research-integrity investigations into other Alzheimer's researchers. In Charles Piller's reporting on the work of neuropharmacologist Othman Ghribi — some of whose questioned papers had appeared in the Journal of Alzheimer's Disease — Perry said he had contacted Ghribi for more information and that the journal would assess the claims; the journal retracted one of the papers in 2024. Perry was also among several scientists who reviewed a dossier of questioned images compiled by image analysts and concurred that some of its findings posed serious questions warranting institutional review.

== Honors ==
Perry is a fellow of the American Association for the Advancement of Science (elected 1997) and a foreign corresponding member of the Royal Spanish Academy of Sciences (elected 2009), the Mexican Academy of Sciences, and the Academy of Sciences of Lisbon (elected 2011). Other recognitions include the Alzheimer's Association Temple Award (1999) and Zenith Fellowship (2007); the American Aging Association's Denham Harman Research Award (2008, shared with Mark A. Smith); the Distinguished Texas Scientist Award of the Texas Academy of Science (2020); the Rous-Whipple Award of the American Society for Investigative Pathology (2021); the Award for Meritorious Contributions to Neuropathology of the American Association of Neuropathologists (2026); and election to the UTSA Academy of Distinguished Researchers (2025). He serves on the advisory board of the Universal Scientific Education and Research Network (USERN) and in 2025 was elected the Neuroscience and Behavior representative on its Policy Making Council for the 2026–2028 term. The International Engineering and Technology Institute confers an award named in his honor, the IETI George Perry Award for Health and Neuroscience. In 2007, Universidad Arturo Prat in Chile conferred on him the degree of Doctor Honoris Causa.

== Service ==
Perry is a past president of the American Association of Neuropathologists (2009) and of the Southwestern and Rocky Mountain Division of the AAAS (2012–2013), and has served on the Medical, Scientific, and Memory Screening Advisory Board of the Alzheimer's Foundation of America. He is chief science officer of the Alzheimer's Research and Prevention Foundation. In 2012 he served as a Fulbright Specialist in public and global health, hosted by the University of Chile. His professional papers (1973–2014) are held in the UTSA Libraries Special Collections.

== Selected publications ==
- Smith, M. A.; Perry, G.; Richey, P. L.; et al. (1996). "Oxidative damage in Alzheimer's". Nature. 382: 120–121. doi:10.1038/382120b0. PMID 8700201.
- Smith, M. A.; Richey Harris, P. L.; Sayre, L. M.; Beckman, J. S.; Perry, G. (1997). "Widespread peroxynitrite-mediated damage in Alzheimer's disease". Journal of Neuroscience. 17: 2653–2657. PMID 9092586.
- Nunomura, A.; Perry, G.; Pappolla, M. A.; et al. (1999). "RNA oxidation is a prominent feature of vulnerable neurons in Alzheimer's disease". Journal of Neuroscience. 19: 1959–1964. PMID 10066249.
- Nunomura, A.; Perry, G.; Aliev, G.; et al. (2001). "Oxidative damage is the earliest event in Alzheimer disease". Journal of Neuropathology and Experimental Neurology. 60: 759–767. PMID 11487050.
- Hirai, K.; Aliev, G.; Nunomura, A.; et al. (2001). "Mitochondrial abnormalities in Alzheimer's disease". Journal of Neuroscience. 21: 3017–3023. PMID 11312286.
- Plascencia-Villa, G.; Ponce, A.; Collingwood, J. F.; et al. (2016). "High-resolution analytical imaging and electron holography of magnetite particles in amyloid cores of Alzheimer's disease". Scientific Reports. 6 24873. doi:10.1038/srep24873. PMC 4848473.
- Castellani, R. J.; Perry, G. (2014). Molecular Pathology of Alzheimer's Disease. San Rafael, California: Morgan & Claypool Life Sciences. ISBN 978-1-61504-638-6.
- Perry, G. (2020). "Biology of Alzheimer's disease". Texas Journal of Science. 72 (1). doi:10.32011/txjsci_72_1_TDS.
