= Arlan Richardson =

American biochemist and academic

Arlan G. Richardson
- Occupations: Biochemist and academic

Academic background
- Education: B.A., Chemistry and Biology; Ph.D., Chemistry
- Alma mater: Peru State College; Oklahoma State University

Arlan G. Richardson is an American biochemist and an academic. He is a professor of Biochemistry and Physiology and the Donald W. Reynolds Endowed Chair of Aging Research at the University of Oklahoma, as well as a senior career research scientist at the Oklahoma City VA Medical Center.

Richardson's work has focused on the molecular and cellular mechanisms of aging, focusing on gene expression, oxidative stress, inflammation, necroptosis, cell senescence, and mitochondrial haplotypes in aging and age-related diseases. His works have been published in academic journals, including Proceedings of the National Academy of Sciences and The Journal of Clinical Investigation.

== Education ==
Richardson completed his B.A. in Chemistry and Biology from Peru State College in 1963. In 1968, he obtained his Ph.D. in Chemistry (emphasis in Biochemistry) from Oklahoma State University in 1968. He completed a post-doctoral fellowship in Biochemistry at the University of Minnesota in 1971.

== Career ==
Richardson began his academic career in 1968 as an assistant professor in the Department of Chemistry at Fort Lewis College, a role he held until 1969. In 1971, he joined Illinois State University, where he served as an assistant professor in the Department of Chemistry from 1971 to 1974, an associate professor from 1974 to 1979, and a Professor from 1979 to 1990. Between 1986 and 1990, he also held the position of Distinguished Professor in the Board of Regents of the State of Illinois. In 1990, he joined the University of Texas Health Science Center at San Antonio. There, he served as a professor in the Department of Medicine from 1990 to 1995, a professor in the Department of Physiology from 1995 to 2003, and a professor in the Department of Cellular and Structural Biology from 2003 to 2013. Richardson also served as director of the San Antonio Nathan Shock Center of Excellence in Basic Biology of Aging from 1995 to 2012.

He joined the University of Oklahoma Health Sciences Center, where he served as a professor in the Department of Geriatric Medicine from 2013 to 2019. Since 2019, he has been a professor in the Department of Biochemistry and Physiology there. He also served as director of the Oklahoma Nathan Shock Center of Excellence in Basic Biology of Aging from 2015 to 2022.

Richardson served as president of both the Gerontological Society of America and the American Aging Association. From 1995 to 2013, he served as the director of the San Antonio Nathan Shock Center of Excellence in Basic Biology of Aging. Since 2013, he has held the Donald W. Reynolds Endowed Chair of Aging Research at the University of Oklahoma Health Sciences Center.

== Research ==
Richardson's research has explored the biology of aging, focusing on the roles of dietary restriction, oxidative stress, mitochondrial dysfunction, genetic regulation, and epigenetic modifications in the aging process and related diseases. His initial research studied the molecular pathways responsible for the anti-aging effects of dietary restriction. His laboratory was the first to show that dietary restriction altered gene expression through changes in the activity of transcription factors.

Richardson also examined age-associated oxidative DNA damage, showing that levels of 8-oxo-2-deoxyguanosine (oxo8dG), a marker of oxidative DNA damage, increase with age in nuclear and mitochondrial DNA across various tissues and species. His research also demonstrated that dietary restriction, known to extend lifespan, mitigates this oxidative damage, providing indirect support for the oxidative stress theory of aging. He studied the effect of oxidative damage/stress on aging using genetically engineered mouse models to alter the expression of antioxidant enzymes on aging. His first experiments on heterozygous manganese superoxide dismutase (MnSOD) knockout mice revealed that reduced MnSOD activity leads to increased oxidative damage, mitochondrial dysfunction, and an elevated incidence of cancer, though without accelerating aging. Subsequent studies, using both transgenic and knockout mice, found limited evidence that oxidative stress significantly influences lifespan, although it may contribute to age-related diseases such as cancer.

In his research on the molecular mechanisms of aging beyond oxidative stress, Richardson explored the role of the mammalian target of rapamycin (mTOR) pathway, showing that its inhibition by rapamycin extends lifespan in mice and ameliorates cognitive deficits and amyloid-beta pathology in Alzheimer's disease models. However, he also identified that rapamycin-induced longevity is independent of insulin sensitivity, implicating distinct pathways in the regulation of aging and metabolic health. In 2018, he studied the pathways responsible for chronic inflammation (inflammaging), which occurs with age. He was the first to show that the cell death pathway of necroptosis contributed to inflammaging and that necroptosis induces cell senescence.

With Steve Austad at the University of Alabama at Birmingham, Richardson developed a unique rat model (OKC-HET^{B/W}) model to study the impact of mitochondria-haplotype on aging.

== Awards and honors ==
- 1993 – Nathan W. Shock Award, Gerontology Research Center of the National Institute on Aging
- 1995 – Robert W. Kleemeier Award, Gerontological Society of America
- 2009 – President‘s Council Distinguished Excellence Award from the University of Texas Health Science Center at San Antonio
- 2001 – Harman Research Award, American Aging Association
- 2008 – Irving Wright Award, American Federation for Aging Research
- 2008 – Lord Cohen Medal, British Society for Research on Ageing
- 2022 – Exceptional Mentor in Aging Award from the American Aging Association
- 2023 – Elected to the Academy for Life and Healthspan Research
- 2025 – 2024 William S. Middleton Award for outstanding achievement in biomedical research from the Department of Veterans Affairs
- 2025 – Geroge M. Martin Lifetime Achievement in Mentoring Award from the American Federation for Aging Research
- 2025 – George Lynn Cross Research Professorship, University of Oklahoma Health Sciences

== Selected articles ==
- Richardson, A., Butler, J. A., Rutherford, M. S., Semsei, I., Gu, M. Z., Fernandes, G., & Cheung, W. H. (1987). Effect of age and dietary restriction on the expression of α2u-globulin. Journal of Biological Chemistry, 262(27), 12821–12825.
- Hamilton, M. L., Van Remmen, H., Drake, J. A., Yang, H., Guo, Z. M., Kewitt, K., ... & Richardson, A. (2001). Does oxidative damage to DNA increase with age? Proceedings of the National Academy of Sciences, 98(18), 10469–10474.
- Pérez, V. I., Bokov, A., Van Remmen, H., Mele, J., Ran, Q., Ikeno, Y., & Richardson, A. (2009). Is the oxidative stress theory of aging dead? Biochimica et Biophysica Acta (BBA) - General Subjects, 1790(10), 1005–1014.
- Caccamo, A., Majumder, S., Richardson, A., Strong, R., & Oddo, S. (2010). Molecular interplay between mammalian target of rapamycin (mTOR), amyloid-β, and Tau: Effects on cognitive impairments. Journal of Biological Chemistry, 285(17), 13107–13120.
- Richardson, A. (2013). Rapamycin, anti-aging, and avoiding the fate of Tithonus. Journal of Clinical Investigation, 123(8), 3204–3206.
- Deepa, S. S., Unnikrishnan, A., Matyi, S., Hadad, N., & Richardson, A. (2018). Necroptosis increases with age and is reduced by dietary restriction. Aging Cell, 17(2), e12770.
- Sathiaseelan, R., Ahn, B., Logan, S., Wanagat, J., Nguyen, H. V. M., Hord, N. G., Vandiver, A. R., Selvarani, R., Ranjit, R., Yarbrough, H., Masingale, A., Miller, B. F., Wolf, R. F., Stout, M. B., Austad, S. N., & Richardson, A. (2023). A genetically heterogeneous rat model with divergent mitochondrial genomes. The Journals of Gerontology: Series A, 78(5), 771–779.
