= United States Adopted Name =

Unique nonproprietary names assigned to pharmaceuticals marketed in the United States

A United States Adopted Name (USAN) is a unique nonproprietary name assigned to a medication marketed in the United States. Each name is assigned by the USAN Council, which is co-sponsored by the American Medical Association (AMA), the United States Pharmacopeial Convention (USP), and the American Pharmacists Association (APhA).

The USAN Program states that its goal is to select simple, informative, and unique nonproprietary names (also called generic names) for drugs by establishing logical nomenclature classifications based on pharmacological or chemical relationships. In addition to drugs, the USAN Council names agents for gene therapy and cell therapy, contact lens polymers, surgical materials, diagnostics, carriers, and substances used as an excipient. The USAN Council works in conjunction with the World Health Organization (WHO) international nonproprietary name (INN) Expert Committee and national nomenclature groups to standardize drug nomenclature and establish rules governing the classification of new substances.

== History ==
The USAN Council began in June 1961 after the AMA and the USP jointly formed the AMA-USP Nomenclature Committee. The American Pharmacists Association (APhA) became the third sponsoring organization in 1964, at which point the name of the committee was changed to the USAN Council, and United States Adopted Name became the official term to describe any nonproprietary name negotiated and formally adopted by the Council. In 1967, a liaison representative from the Food and Drug Administration (FDA) was appointed to serve on the USAN Council. The FDA announced in 1984 that it would discontinue adding drug names to its official list and use the USAN as the established name for labeling and advertising new single-entity drugs marketed in the United States. The AMA Council on Drugs no longer exists as a separate entity. The FDA now has a representative on the USAN Council, which has moved away from chemically derived names.

Currently, the USAN Council has five members, one from each sponsoring organization, one from the FDA, and a member-at-large. One member is nominated to the USAN Council annually by each sponsoring organization; the FDA nominates one liaison member annually. The member-at-large is selected by the sponsoring organizations from a list of candidates proposed by the AMA, APhA, and the USP. The five nominees to the Council must be approved annually by the board of trustees of the three sponsoring organizations.

=== USAN Council members ===
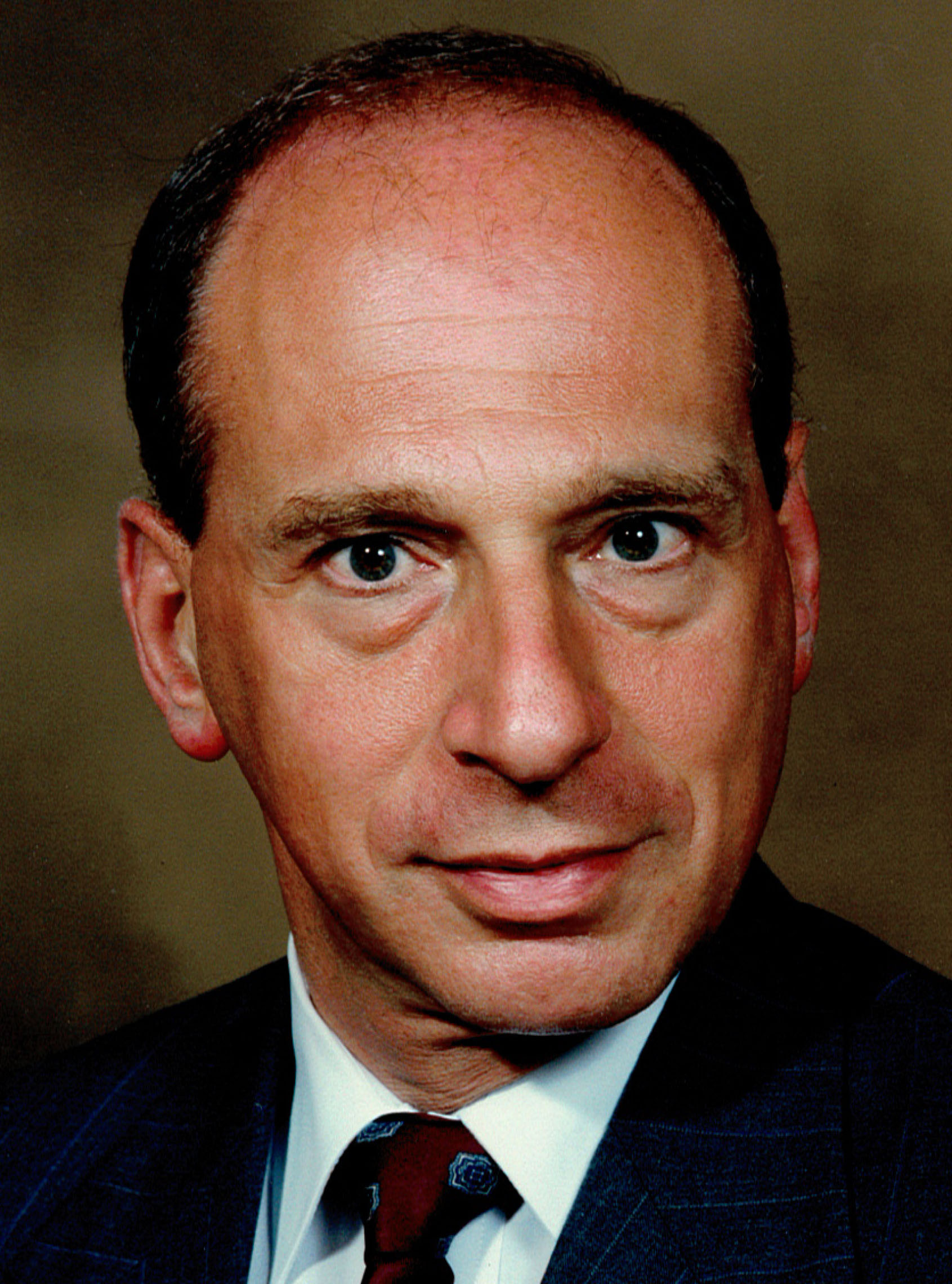
Peter Rheinstein, USAN Council Chairman, since 2012

- Gerry McEvoy, Pharm.D. (Member-at-Large)
- Thomas P. Reinders
- Rohit Kolhatkar, PhD
- Peter Rheinstein, Chair (since 2012)
- Armen Melikian

== Use ==
By definition, nonproprietary names are not subject to proprietary trademark rights but are entirely in the public domain. This distinguishes them from the trademarked names that have been registered for private use.

== Name assignment ==
Assignment of a USAN takes into account practical considerations, such as the existence of trademarks, international harmonization of drug nomenclature, the development of new classes of drugs, and the fact that the intended uses of substances for which names are being selected may change.

USANs assigned today reflect both present nomenclature practices and older methods used to name drug entities. Early drug nomenclature was based on the chemical structure. As newer drugs became chemically more complex and numerous, nonproprietary names based on chemistry became long and difficult to spell, pronounce, or remember. Additionally, chemically derived names provided little useful information to non-chemist health practitioners. Considering the needs of health professionals led to a system in which USANs reflect relationships between new entities and older drugs, and avoid names that might suggest non-existent relationships.

Current nomenclature practices involve the adoption of standardized syllables called "stems" that relate new chemical entities to existing drug families. Stems may be prefixes, suffixes, or interfixes in the nonproprietary name. Each stem can emphasize a specific chemical structure type, a pharmacologic property, or a combination of these attributes. The recommended list of USAN stems is updated regularly to keep pace to accommodate drugs with new chemical and pharmacologic properties.

As a general rule, the application for a USAN should be forwarded to the USAN Council after the Investigational New Drug (IND) is active and clinical trials have begun.

Many drug manufacturers seeking a USAN are multinational companies with subsidiaries in various parts of the world or contractual agreements with drug firms outside the United States. Therefore, it is highly desirable to the pharmaceutical company, the various nomenclature committees, and the medical community in general that a global name be established for each new single-entity compound introduced. Assigning a USAN and standardizing names internationally can take anywhere from several months to a few years.

When necessary to distinguish between biosimilars, the FDA mandates that a lowercase four-letter suffix "devoid of meaning" be added to the drug's core name — for example, at the end of letibotulinumtoxinA-wlbg (Letybo) or tarlatamab-dlle (Imdelltra).

== Differences between USAN and INN ==
Examples of drugs for which the USAN differs from the INN include:

INN	USAN
glibenclamide	glyburide
isoprenaline	isoproterenol
moracizine	moricizine
orciprenaline	metaproterenol
paracetamol	acetaminophen
pethidine	meperidine
rifampicin	rifampin
salbutamol	albuterol
torasemide	torsemide
retigabine	ezogabine

== See also ==
- British Approved Name
- International Nonproprietary Name
- Nomenclature of monoclonal antibodies
- United States Pharmacopeia
