= Leonard P. Guarente =

American biogerontologist

- Born: 1952 (age 73–74); Revere, Massachusetts, U.S.
- Education: Massachusetts Institute of Technology (BS, PhD)
- Scientific career
- Thesis: Genetics of Transcription Termination (1979)
- Doctoral students: Brian K. Kennedy; Matt Kaeberlein
- Website: web.mit.edu/biology/guarente/

Leonard Pershing Guarente (born 1952) is an American biologist best known for his research on life span extension in the budding yeast Saccharomyces cerevisiae, roundworms (Caenorhabditis elegans), and mice. He is a Novartis Professor of Biology at the Massachusetts Institute of Technology.

== Early life and education ==
Leonard Guarente was born and raised in Revere, Massachusetts and was the first person in his family to attend college, when he started his undergraduate work at MIT in 1970. He earned his Ph.D. at MIT, studying under Jon Beckwith and Mark Ptashne. He did a post doc at Harvard.

== Science ==
MIT hired Guarente and he opened his own lab in 1981; he earned tenure there in 1986. For the first nine years, his lab studied gene regulation in yeast.

In 1991 his lab started to study genes involved in aging. In 1993, Cynthia Kenyon's lab at UCSF discovered that a single-gene mutation in (Daf-2) could double the lifespan of C. elegans. That same year, David Sinclair joined the Guarente lab, and they developed the hypothesis that caloric restriction slows aging by activation of sirtuins. The Kenyon and Guarente labs came to lead the field studying the genetics of aging.

In 1995 the Guarente lab identified the gene SIR4 (Silent information regulator 4) as a longevity regulator. When SIR4 was mutated in a single cell organism S. cerevisiae longevity was extended. It was later determined that the complex of SIR2 and SIR4 are responsible for longevity phenotype, and that over-expression of SIR2 alone was sufficient to extend lifespan. Moreover, scientists in Guarente laboratory determined that SIR2 is necessary for longevity extension by calorie restriction.

In 1999, Guarente and Kenyon became co-founders of Elixir Pharmaceuticals, which aimed to develop drugs targeting sirtuin; Guarente left the company seven years later after he disagreed with venture capitalists who had gained control of the company about the focus of the company.

In 2000 the Guarente laboratory published work identifying SIR2's activity as a NAD+-dependent protein deacetylase. This NAD dependence explained how SIR2 could connect diet to physiology and suggested the mechanism by which calorie restriction could extend the lifespan of some organisms.

Guarente made the case that involvement of SIR2 in metabolism and lifespan is conserved in other organisms. In round worm, Guarente reported that Caenorhabditis elegans, expression of SIR2 (sir2.1) is sufficient to extend longevity and in the fruit fly, Drosophila melanogaster, overexpression of SIR2 was also reported to extended lifespan. However, other groups have disputed this finding and showed that SIR2-expression does not cause lifespan extension in worms or flies. Overexpression of SIRT1 (mammalian sir2 homolog) does not extend lifespan. Several of Guarente's high profile publications on SIRT1 have been retracted or corrected.

Guarente wrote an autobiography in 2003 titled Ageless Quest: One Scientist's Search for Genes That Prolong Youth.

Guarente's rivalry with Sinclair, which began in 2002 when Sinclair challenged Guarante's description of how sir2 might be involved in aging at a scientific meeting at Cold Spring Harbor Laboratory, was the subject of an article in Science in 2004.

In 2014 Guarente co-founded the dietary supplement company Elysium Health.
