= Veronica Galvan =

Biologist and Scholar on Aging

Veronica Galvan is a professor and the Donald W. Reynolds Endowed Chair of Aging Research in the Department of Biochemistry and Molecular Biology at the University of Oklahoma Health Sciences Center. Since December 2022, she has served as director of the Oklahoma Nathan Shock Center on Aging. She also serves as co-director of the Center for Geroscience and Healthy Brain Aging at the University of Oklahoma Health Sciences Center.

Galvan attended the Center for Advanced Studies in Exact Sciences University, Buenos Aires, Argentina, and received her master's degree in 1994. She then moved to the University of Chicago, where she received her Ph.D. in virology in 1999 under the mentorship of Dr. Bernard Roizman. She then moved to the Buck Institute for Research on Aging, where she completed postdoctoral research in neuroscience under the mentorship of Dr. Dale Bredesen. She joined the faculty of the University of Texas Health Science Center San Antonio in 1999 as an assistant professor, and was promoted to associate professor with tenure in 2016. In 2021 she moved to the University of Oklahoma Health Sciences Center, where she became a full professor.

Galvan is a Fellow of the American Aging Association, the largest scientific society devoted to the study of the biology of aging in the United States of America, and served as its president from 2021 to 2022. Since 2021, she has served as editor in chief of the journal GeroScience.

Galvan's laboratory focuses on the molecular biology of Alzheimer's disease and other tauopathies, with an emphasis on mTOR signaling and rapamycin.
