= Bob Knight (psychologist) =

Bob G. Knight (born October 18, 1950), is the former associate dean of the USC Davis School of Gerontology, the Merle H. Bensinger Professor of Gerontology and Psychology and the director of the Tingstad Older Adult Counseling Center. He is best known for research and theory development on cross-cultural issues in stress and coping during family caregiving for dementia and also for theory and scholarship on adapting psychotherapy for work with older adults.

Knight is also the editor of Journal of Gerontology: Psychological Sciences which is published on behalf of the Gerontological Society of America.

== Research ==
Knight has researched family caregiving stress and coping issues for more than 20 years. His research program has contributed to model development in stress and coping, especially with regard to cross-cultural differences with the sociocultural stress and coping model, which has been updated in the past year to reflect advances in understanding caregiving stress. The research has included studies of Caucasians, African-Americans, Latinos and Korean-Americans as well as caregivers in Korea and in Spain, and he has published extensively on these topics.

His key findings to date include the existence of a common core model linking behavior problems to appraised burden to poor physical and mental health outcomes. There is evidence for differences between ethnic and national groups in the influence of coping styles and social support in the model and for the influence of cultural values of familial obligation on poor health, usually acting through coping styles or through social support. The proposed project builds on his research by exploring caregivers’ own views of their personal adaptive systems and of the personal and cultural values motivating and sustaining caregiving.

His current research interests include cultural difference in stress and coping models used to understand family caregiving, age differences in the effects of emotion on cognition, and the assessment and facilitation of wisdom in older adults. Knight is also leading the interdisciplinary clinic GAP (Geriatric Assessment Program), now in its pilot stages on the USC campus and also provides counseling to older adults.

== Publications ==
Knight has published extensively in mental health and aging, including Psychotherapy with older adults (Sage, 3rd ed. 2004, available in French, Dutch, Japanese, and Chinese translations), Outreach with the elderly (NYU Press, 1989), Older adults in psychotherapy: Case histories (Sage, 1992). He is the senior editor, along with Linda Teri, Paul Wohlford, and John Santos, of Mental health services for older adults: Implications for training and practice (1995), and co-edited with Steven Zarit, A guide to psychotherapy and aging: Effective clinical interventions in a life-stage context (1996), both published by APA Books. He is also the co-editor with Sara Qualls of Psychotherapy with depression in older adults (2006), published by Wiley and with Ken Laidlaw of Handbook of emotional disorders in late life: Assessment and treatment (2008).

== Honors ==
- Marjorie Coote Memorial Lecturer, British Society of Gerontology, 1998
- USC Mellon Award for Excellence in Mentoring, 2005
- Distinguished Clinical Mentorship Award, Clinical Geropsychology Section (Section II of Division 12), American Psychological Association, 2005
- Australian Psychological Society International Visiting Fellow, Fall, 2005
- Honorary Fellow, School of Health in Social Science, University of Edinburgh, 2005-2008
- Honorary Professor in Psychology, University of Queensland, Australia. 2009-
- American Psychological Association's Committee on Aging Award for the Advancement of Psychology and Aging, 2009
