= Peter Fedichev =

Physicist and biotechnologist

- Born: Peter Olegovich Fedichev
- Education: Moscow Institute of Physics and Technology (M.S.); University of Amsterdam (Ph.D.)
- Occupations: Physicist, biotechnologist, entrepreneur
- Known for: Pioneering "gerophysics"; quantitative physical models of aging; AI-driven longevity drug discovery; early contributions to quantum simulation and analog gravity, co-founding Gero
- Scientific career
- Workplaces: Gero

Peter Fedichev is a physicist and biotechnologist. He worked on ultracold quantum systems before moving into computational drug design and later longevity research.

He is the co-founder and chief executive officer of Gero, a biotechnology company based in Singapore that applies physics-based and machine-learning methods to ageing and disease research.

== Education and early career ==
Fedichev received an M.Sc. in theoretical physics from the Moscow Institute of Physics and Technology while conducting research at the Kurchatov Institute. In 1994 he joined the University of Amsterdam and the AMOLF institute, completing a Ph.D. cum laude in theoretical physics. He later worked at the University of Innsbruck on condensed matter and quantum-gas systems.

== Research ==
=== Quantum physics research ===
Following his doctoral studies at the University of Amsterdam and AMOLF, Fedichev worked in the field of ultracold atomic gases, Bose-Einstein condensates, quantum information, and many-body quantum systems. During the late 1990s and early 2000s he collaborated with physicists including Peter Zoller, J. Ignacio Cirac, Jan von Delft, Uwe R. Fischer, and Andrew Daley on problems in quantum simulation, strongly correlated quantum matter, and analogue models of gravitational phenomena.

His research contributed to several areas of quantum physics, including anyonic excitations in ultracold gases, spin-charge separation, quantum information processing, and analogue gravity.

Several of these publications became highly cited within the quantum-gas and quantum-simulation communities. His paper "Influence of Nearly Resonant Light on the Scattering Length in Low-Temperature Atomic Gases" is among the early theoretical works on optical control of atomic interactions in ultracold gases.

Some of Fedichev's collaborators, including Peter Zoller and J. Ignacio Cirac, later received the 2022 Wolf Prize in Physics for foundational contributions to quantum information science and quantum simulation. Their work has frequently been discussed as laying foundations for modern quantum computing and quantum simulation technologies.

=== Computational drug discovery and molecular modeling ===
In the early 2000s, Fedichev moved from theoretical physics into computational chemistry and drug discovery and co-founded Quantum Pharmaceuticals, an early company exploring computational drug design. This work applied physics-based computational modeling to molecular simulation, biomolecular electrostatics, virtual screening, and structure-based drug design, including antiviral and metabolism-related drug discovery programs.

Fedichev and collaborators reported the discovery of small-molecule antiviral compounds targeting influenza A nucleoprotein and the HIV-1 matrix protein.

This work resulted in a series of intellectual property filings. Fedichev is listed as an inventor on U.S. Patent 9,610,264, "Compounds for the Treatment and Prevention of Retroviral Infections", granted in 2017. The patent covers a class of small-molecule compounds intended for the treatment and prevention of retroviral infections, including HIV infection.

Fedichev also co-authored studies on modulation of phosphofructokinase enzymes involved in glycolysis, work that later contributed to therapeutic programs targeting cancer metabolism, neurodegeneration, and aging-related diseases.

Fedichev's research also included the application of computational chemistry and structure-based drug design to antibacterial drug discovery. In collaboration with researchers at New York University, he participated in efforts to identify inhibitors of bacterial hydrogen sulfide (H₂S) biosynthesis, a pathway implicated in antibiotic resistance, antibiotic tolerance, persister-cell formation, and biofilm survival.

This work contributed to the identification of allosteric inhibitors of bacterial cystathionine γ-lyase (bCSE), an enzyme responsible for endogenous H₂S production in several pathogenic bacteria. The inhibitors were shown to potentiate multiple classes of bactericidal antibiotics, reduce bacterial persistence, disrupt biofilm formation, and improve antibiotic efficacy in animal infection models.

=== Aging research and drug discovery ===
Since 2015, Fedichev has led Gero.ai, whose studies use large health datasets and mathematical models to analyse ageing dynamics, and he has been the principal proponent of a physics-based, quantitative approach to aging that treats the organism as a dynamical system near a stability boundary and describes aging using concepts from statistical physics, [[non-equilibrium thermodynamics]], and the theory of stochastic processes. A central premise is that aging is a system-level process, the progressive loss of physiological resilience, rather than the sum of individual diseases; Fedichev has argued that targeting this upstream process could delay multiple age-related conditions at once.

As early as 2012, before his first formal publications in the area, Fedichev was publicly discussing a possible connection between phase transitions in [[gene regulatory network]]s and the dynamics of aging, suggesting in a blog post that the stability of such networks near a critical point might be related to slow or "negligible" aging. He developed these ideas into a formal model in 2015.

Key elements of the framework, developed by Fedichev and his collaborators at Gero with Fedichev as senior author, include:

- Mortality from network dynamics (2015). Fedichev and colleagues argued

analytically that the Gompertz mortality law can emerge from the critical dynamics of gene regulatory networks operating near a stability boundary, linking network-level dynamics to demographic mortality patterns without invoking programmed aging. It was among the earliest attempts to derive a demographic law of mortality from underlying system dynamics.

- Strehler–Mildvan correlation (2017). Fedichev and colleagues showed that

the long-cited Strehler–Mildvan correlation may arise as a degenerate artifact of fitting the Gompertz model rather than reflecting an independent biological mechanism, implying that some established empirical regularities in aging research may be statistical rather than causal.

- Resilience and a lifespan limit (2021). Analyzing longitudinal blood

biomarkers and wearable activity data, Fedichev and co-authors reported that physiological resilience (the rate of recovery from perturbation) declines approximately linearly with age, and extrapolated a loss of resilience at roughly 120–150 years as a model-based limit on human lifespan under current conditions. The study appeared in Nature Communications and was covered widely, including by Scientific American and Popular Mechanics. It was among the journal's 25 most-downloaded health sciences articles published in 2021. The authors argued that, because this limit reflects proximity to a dynamical critical point, it is unlikely to be raised by therapies aimed at individual chronic diseases or frailty alone, and that substantial life extension would instead require intervening in the aging process itself; they noted that no law of nature appears to forbid such an intervention.

- Dynamic and entropic components of aging. Fedichev and colleagues

proposed that aging can be separated into a reversible "dynamic" component, sensitive to interventions, and an "entropic" component reflecting the cumulative, approximately irreversible accumulation of stochastic molecular changes, reported as largely unaffected by interventions such as caloric restriction, rapamycin, parabiosis, and epigenetic reprogramming in the datasets examined. Fedichev has presented this as an argument that slowing or halting aging may be more tractable than fully reversing it, in contrast to research approaches centered on cellular reprogramming and rejuvenation.

- Thermodynamic control variables. Work led by Fedichev introduced a small

set of macroscopic control variables for aging, including an organism-level "effective temperature" governing the amplitude of biological fluctuations, and distinguished variables that affect healthspan from those that set maximum lifespan. The authors proposed effective temperature as a previously unrecognized and potentially druggable target distinct from those addressed by existing therapies.

- Classification of aging interventions. Fedichev and colleagues proposed

that anti-aging interventions can be grouped into three levels according to which physical variable they target and their predicted effect on healthspan versus maximum lifespan. Level 1 interventions act on the reversible "dynamic" component, improving current physiological state and lowering disease risk without changing the lifespan ceiling; the authors associate this level with most existing treatments and lifestyle measures. Level 2 interventions reduce organism-level fluctuations (the "effective temperature"), which the authors predict would compress late-life morbidity and allow more individuals to approach the species maximum lifespan, and which they put forward as the most immediately druggable level. Level 3 interventions would act on the rate of irreversible damage accumulation, the only level the framework predicts could raise maximum lifespan itself, and which the authors describe as the principal open challenge. The same body of work distinguishes a "stable" aging regime (humans and other long-lived mammals), in which slow damage accumulation is rate-limiting, from an "unstable" regime (short-lived model organisms such as mice, flies, and worms), a distinction also discussed in the broader gerophysics literature.

- Canine intervention study (2026). In a randomized, placebo-controlled

study of 99 aged sled dogs, Fedichev and colleagues reported that the reverse-transcriptase inhibitor lamivudine, given for about 30 months, produced transient, female-predominant slowing of a DNA methylation clock that reversed after treatment stopped, while the modeled biological-age trajectory was unchanged. The authors interpreted the results as identifying effective ("phenotypic") temperature as a control variable governing the kinetics of organism-level failure and an actionable target for extending healthspan rather than maximum lifespan. The work is a preprint and has not been peer reviewed.

Fedichev is one of the guest editors of the Gerophysics collection in the Nature Portfolio, an effort that frames the emerging field of physics-based aging research. Elements of the framework have been operationalized in Gero's digital-health products and applied in the company's pharmaceutical collaborations with Pfizer (2023) and Chugai Pharmaceutical of the Roche group (2025).

In May 2024, Fedichev debated biomedical gerontologist Aubrey de Grey at the Foresight Institute in a public discussion titled How to Defeat Aging, organized by Open Longevity. The debate contrasted de Grey's advocacy of rejuvenation therapies aimed at repairing age-related damage with Fedichev's view that aging is constrained by thermodynamic and stochastic processes, emphasizing interventions to slow or halt the accumulation of irreversible damage and achieve negligible senescence. The event highlighted differing approaches within longevity research regarding rejuvenation versus the prevention of aging-related decline.

=== Gero ===
Gero, co-founded in 2018 by Fedichev and Maxim Kholin in Singapore, develops physics-informed AI models trained on electronic medical records and molecular-level data to predict health trajectories and identify potential therapeutic targets for aging-related conditions. In January 2023 Gero entered a research collaboration with Pfizer to identify therapeutic targets for fibrotic diseases. In July 2025 Gero signed a joint research and license agreement with Chugai Pharmaceutical (a member of the Roche Group) to develop antibody therapies against targets identified by its AI models.

In June 2026, Gero was named a World Economic Forum (WEF) Technology Pioneer, becoming part of the Forum's 2026 cohort of 100 companies recognized for developing technologies with the potential to significantly impact business and society. The company was recognized for its physics-based approach to aging research and AI-driven drug discovery platform, which combines large-scale human longitudinal data, machine learning, and principles from statistical physics to identify therapeutic targets for age-related diseases.

== Selected publications ==
- Pyrkov T.V., Avchaciov K., Tarkhov A.E., Denisov K.A., & Fedichev P.O. (2021). "Longitudinal analysis of blood markers reveals progressive loss of resilience and predicts human lifespan limit." Nature Communications, 12 (2765).
- Cortassa S., Fedichev P.O., et al. (2022). "Inhibitors of bacterial H₂S biogenesis targeting antibiotic resistance and tolerance." Science.
- Tarkhov A.E., Denisov K.A., & Fedichev P.O. (2025). "Aging Clocks, Entropy, and the Challenge of Age Reversal." Aging Biology.
- Fedichev P.O., Gruber J., Denisov K.A. (2024). "Discovery of Thermodynamic Control Variables that Independently Regulate Healthspan and Maximum Lifespan." Aging Biology.
