= American Board of Legal Medicine =

- Logo of the American Board of Legal Medicine
- Type: Professional Society
- Headquarters: Severna Park, Maryland
- Location: United States
- Chairman: Peter Rheinstein
- Website: http://www.ablminc.org/

The American Board of Legal Medicine sets the standards for training and certifying competency in health care law for dual degreed physician attorneys, with the self-stated aim of promoting excellence in practice through its certification process. Candidates who have completed the requisite training may take an examination to become board-certified by ABLM.

== History ==
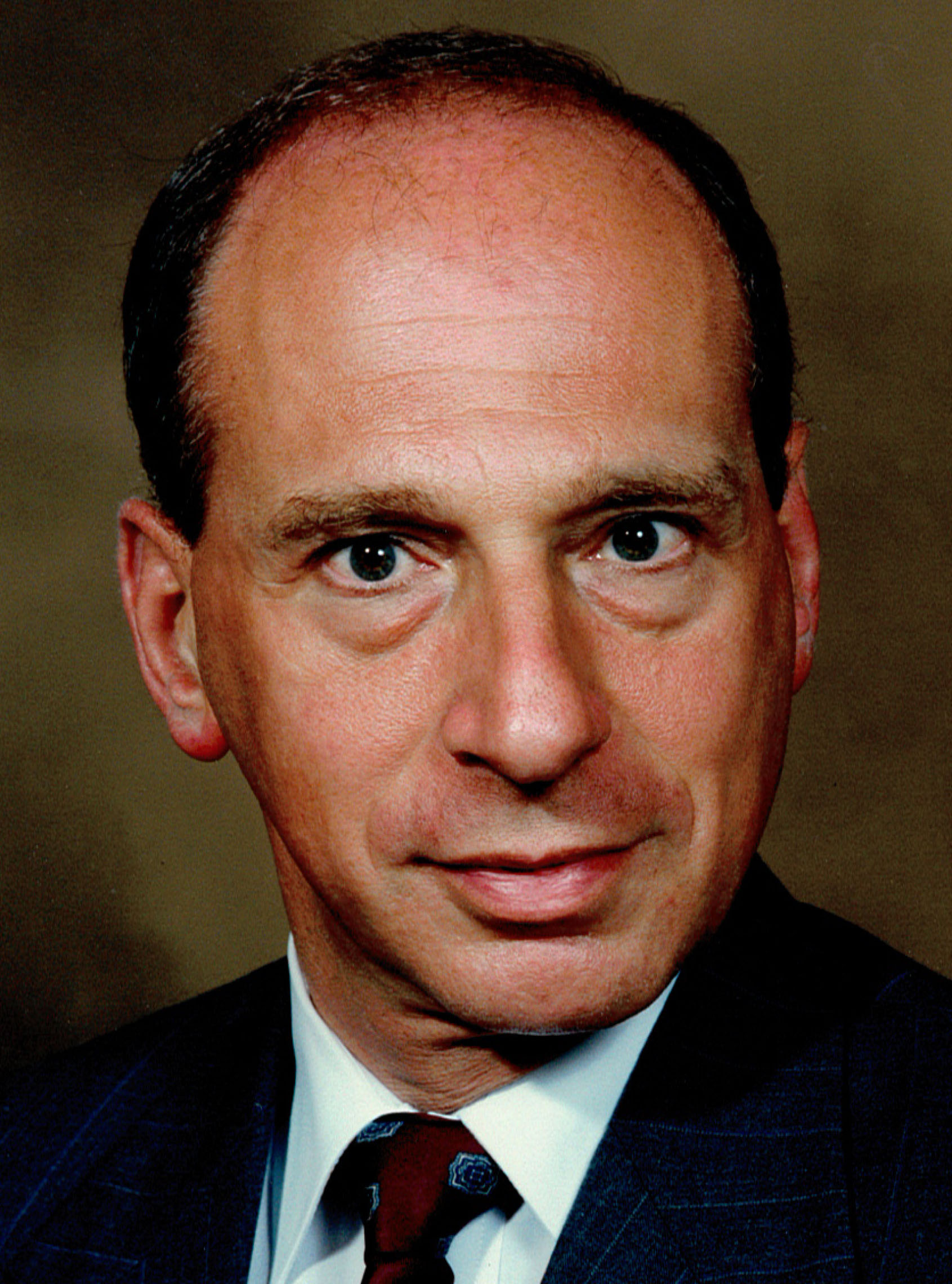
Peter Rheinstein, Chairman of the American Board of Legal Medicine

The current American Board of Legal Medicine is a nonprofit organization incorporated in 1951 in the state of Delaware. In 1980, the American Board of Law in Medicine, Inc. also was incorporated in the state of Delaware. To facilitate the recognition of Legal Medicine as a specialty, the two entities merged in 1987 with the surviving entity being the American Board of Legal Medicine, Inc.

== Organization ==
The ABLM is governed by a twelve-member board, who elect their own chairman, secretary, and treasurer.

== Examination process ==
ABLM administers examinations to individuals with both legal and medical degrees. The Board has certified approximately 300 MD/JDs in legal medicine by means of computer-based or paper based examinations. The ABLM also furnishes study materials and courses in Legal Medicine and Medical Malpractice.

== Legal Medicine, 8th edition ==
Authored by the two primary organizations in the field, American College of Legal Medicine & American Board of Legal Medicine, Legal Medicine: Health Care Law and Medical Ethics, 8th Edition provides up-to-date information on topics surrounding professional medical liability, the business aspects of medical practice, and medicolegal and ethical issues.

== Board members ==
- Peter Rheinstein, Chairman
- Matthias Okoye, Secretary
- John D. Busowski, Treasurer
- S. Sandy Sanbar, Executive Director
- Michael Brooks
- Marvin Firestone
- John K. Hall
- Weldon E. Havins
- Richard Kelly
- Joseph P. McMenamin
- Daniel L. Orr II

== Past Chairpersons ==
- Edgar Reed, 1980–84
- Lee Goldsmith, 1984–86
- Cyril Wecht, 1986–96
- Allan Gibofsky, 1996–2003
- Sal Fiscina, 2003–2007
- S. Sandy Sanbar, 2007–2011
