= The Journals of Gerontology =

- Discipline: Geriatrics, gerontology
- Language: English
- Edited by: Rafael de Cabo (Biological Sciences) Stephen Kritchevsky (Medical Sciences); Bob Knight (Psychological Sciences) Merril Silverstein (Social Sciences)

Publication details
- Former name: The Journal of Gerontology
- History: 1946-present
- Publisher: Oxford University Press on behalf of The Gerontological Society of America (United States)
- Frequency: Monthly (Series A), Bimonthly (Series B)
- Impact factor: Series A: 4.598 Series B: 2.615 (2011)

Standard abbreviations
- ISO 4: J. Gerontol.

Indexing
- Series A
- ISSN: 1079-5006 (print); 1758-535X (web)
- Series B
- ISSN: 1079-5014 (print); 1758-5368 (web)

Links
- The Journals of Gerontology, Series A; The Journals of Gerontology, Series B; The Journal of Gerontology & the Journals of Gerontology (1946–1994)

The Journals of Gerontology are the first scientific journals on aging published in the United States. The publication is separated into four separate peer-reviewed scientific journals, each with its own editor, and published in two series. The Journal of Gerontology: Biological Sciences and the Journal of Gerontology: Medical Sciences are housed within The Journals of Gerontology, Series A; the Journal of Gerontology: Psychological Sciences and the Journal of Gerontology: Social Sciences are housed within The Journals of Gerontology, Series B. The journals are published by Oxford University Press on behalf of The Gerontological Society of America.

== History ==
The journals were founded under the title Journal of Gerontology in 1946. In 1961, material dealing with social policy, program development, and service delivery was split into a new journal, The Gerontologist. In 1988 Journal of Gerontology was renamed Journals of Gerontology to reflect the fact that it represented a composite of four journals with four separate editors, and in 1995 it was split into two separate publications: the Journals of Gerontology: Biological Sciences and Medical Sciences and the Journals of Gerontology: Psychological Sciences and Social Sciences.

== Series A ==
=== Journal of Gerontology: Biological Sciences ===
Journal of Gerontology: Biological Sciences publishes articles relating to the biology of aging. Topics include biochemistry, cellular and molecular biology, genetics, neuroscience, comparative and evolutionary biology, biodemography, and biological underpinnings of late life diseases.

The editors-in-chief are Rozalyn Anderson and David Le Couteur.

=== Journal of Gerontology: Medical Sciences ===
Journal of Gerontology: Medical Sciences publishes material on a range of medical sciences relating to aging. Topics include basic medical science, clinical epidemiology, clinical research, and health services research.

The editor-in-chief is Anne B. Newman.

== Series B ==
=== Journal of Gerontology: Psychological Sciences ===
Journal of Gerontology: Psychological Sciences publishes articles relating to the psychology of aging. Topics include attitudes, cognition, perception, sensation, emotion, personality, health psychology, neuropsychology, and physiological psychology.

The editor-in-chief is Derek M. Isaacowitz.

=== Journal of Gerontology: Social Sciences ===
Journal of Gerontology: Social Sciences publishes material relating to aging from the field of social sciences. Topics include public health, epidemiology, social work, demography, anthropology, social history, political science, and economics.

The editor-in-chief is Deborah S. Carr.
