= Rozalyn Anderson =

Biochemist

- Education: Trinity College and University college, Dublin, Ireland
- Known for: Caloric restriction longevity studies in primates
- Scientific career
- Institutions: University of Wisconsin
- Website: andersonlab.medicine.wisc.edu

Rozalyn (Roz) Anderson is a professor at the University of Wisconsin School of Medicine and Public Health. She studies aging and caloric restriction in primates.

== Education ==
Anderson received her bachelor's degree from Trinity College, Dublin and her Ph.D. in biochemistry from University College Dublin. In 2000 she moved to Harvard Medical School, Boston, Massachusetts for a post-doctoral fellowship with David Sinclair, where she studied caloric restriction and aging in yeast. She began studying mammalian aging during a second post-doctoral fellowship with Richard Weindruch at the University of Wisconsin Institute on Aging and as an assistant scientist at the Wisconsin National Primate Research Center. She is currently a professor at the University of Wisconsin in the Department of Medicine in the Division of Geriatrics and Gerontology. Since 2014, Anderson has also been affiliated with the Division of Endocrinology, Diabetes and Metabolism.

== Research ==
In the Sinclair laboratory at Harvard Medical School, Anderson researched the regulation of the lifespan by calorie restriction in yeast, demonstrating that lifespan could be extended by genetic manipulation of the NAD^{+} salvage pathway, and that calorie restriction downregulates NAD^{+}.

Anderson worked as part of the University of Wisconsin team that demonstrated that caloric restriction has a beneficial effect in rhesus monkeys, improves survival, and lowers the incidence of diseases including diabetes, cancer, and cardiovascular disease over the course of nearly three decades. She continues to study caloric restriction, focusing on primate skeletal muscle, white adipose tissue, inflammation, mitochondrial dysfunction, and metabolic regulators of cancer growth.

In a 2014 interview discussing the different results of the National Institute of Aging and University of Wisconsin rhesus monkey caloric restriction studies, Anderson points out that due to the experimental setup, both the control and experimental groups were calorie restricted to some degree, which explains why no significant improvement was found in the experimental group. She also points out that the two studies are more informative due to their differing designs than if they had been performed identically.

In 2013, Anderson won the Nathan Shock New Investigator Award from the Gerontological Society of America.

From 2019-2021, Anderson served as the President of the American Aging Association.

Anderson is the co-editor-in-chief of The Journals of Gerontology Series A: Biological Sciences.
