= American Aging Association =

Non-profit organization

The American Aging Association is a non-profit, tax-exempt biogerontology organization of scientists and laypeople dedicated to biomedical aging studies and geroscience, with the goal of slowing the aging process to extend the healthy human lifespan while preserving and restoring functions typically lost to age-related degeneration. The abbreviation AGE is intended to be representative of the organization, even though it is not an acronym (this avoids possible confusion with the American Automobile Association, AAA).

== History and organization ==
AGE was founded in 1970 by Denham Harman, MD, PhD, who is often known as the "father" of the "free-radical theory of aging". Harman's goal was to form a lay-scientific organization patterned after the American Heart Association to promote biomedical aging research. Harman served as the first president of AGE, and was executive director of AGE for 20 years (1973 to 1993).

AGE has received research grants from the National Institutes of Health and the Ellison Medical Foundation. In 2016, AGE became a member of the Federation of American Societies for Experimental Biology.

The vice-presidency of AGE is to be a layperson position focused on promoting the scientific goals of AGE to the general public.

== Activities ==
The primary activities of AGE are to:

1. hold annual scientific conferences (every Spring/Summer)
2. give awards to researchers making significant contributions to the goals of AGE
3. promote interest among young scientists in the goals of AGE, aided by the AGE Trainee Chapter (AGE-TC).
4. publish newsletters and journals

The journal of AGE is GeroScience. Formerly called AGE, the journal name was officially changed at the beginning of 2017.

Conferences

- 37th annual conference of AGE was held May 30 – June 2, 2008 in Boulder, Colorado, organized by President Thomas Johnson.
- 38th annual conference of AGE was held May 29 – June 1, 2009 in Scottsdale, Arizona, organized by President S. Mitch Harman.
- 39th annual conference of AGE was held June 4 – June 7, 2010 in Portland, Oregon, organized by President Janko Nikolich-Zugich.
- 40th annual conference of AGE was held on June 3 – June 6, 2011 in Raleigh, North Carolina, organized by President Holly Brown-Borg.
- 41st annual conference of AGE was held on June 1 – June 4, 2012 in Fort Worth, Texas, organized by President Michael Forster.
- 42nd annual conference of AGE was held on May 31 – June 3, 2013 in Baltimore, Maryland, organized by President LaDora Thompson.
- 43rd annual conference of AGE was held on May 30 – June 2, 2014 in San Antonio, Texas, organized by President Rochelle Buffenstein.
- 44th annual conference of AGE was held on May 29 – June 1, 2015 in Marina del Rey, California, organized by President James Nelson.
- 45th annual conference of AGE was held on June 3–5, 2016 in Seattle, Washington, organized by President Matt Kaeberlein.
- 46th annual conference of AGE was held on June 9–12, 2017 in Brooklyn, New York.
- 47th annual conference of AGE was held on June 27 – July 1, 2018 in Philadelphia, Pennsylvania, organized by President Christian Sell.
- 48th annual conference of AGE was held on May 29 – June 2, 2019 in San Francisco, California, organized by President Heinrich Jasper.
- 49th annual conference of AGE was held on July 20–23, 2021 in Madison, Wisconsin, organized by President Rozalyn Anderson.
- 50th annual conference of AGE was held May 17-20, 2022 in San Antonio, Texas, organized by President Veronica Galvan.
- 51st annual conference of AGE was held June 8-11, 2023 in Oklahoma City, Oklahoma, organized by President Holly Van Remmen.
- 52nd annual conference of AGE was held June 2-5, 2024 in Madison, Wisconsin, organized by President Dudley Lamming.
- 53rd annual conference of AGE was held May 11-14, 2025 in Anchorage, Alaska, organized by President Benjamin Miller.

== See also ==
- Aging
- Senescence
- Biogerontology
