= Rafael de Cabo =

American scientist

Rafael de Cabo is a Spanish scientist and Branch Chief of the Translational Gerontology Branch at the National Institute on Aging, a division of the U.S. National Institutes of Health. Rafael de Cabo attended the University of Cordoba, Spain and Purdue University, where he obtained his Bachelors of Science and Masters from the University of Cordoba and his Ph.D. from Purdue University. His research on calorie restriction in rhesus macaques suggested that calorie restriction in monkeys have no significant effects on their lifespan. In 2011, his research on obese mice suggested that resveratrol mimetic helps extend longevity and his research on male mice suggested that metformin have a longevity effect.

== Awards ==
Rafael de Cabo was awarded both the American Federation for Aging Research Irving S. Wright Award of Distinction and the Denham Harman Award in 2023. He was also awarded with the AFAR's Vince Cristofalo Rising Star Award in 2014.
