= Reisa Sperling =

Neurologist

Reisa Sperling is a professor in neurology at Harvard Medical School, Director of the Center for Alzheimer Research and Treatment at Brigham and Women's Hospital, and Director of Neuroimaging for the Massachusetts Alzheimer's Disease Research Center at Massachusetts General Hospital.

Sperling attended Columbia University and Harvard Medical School.

In 2021, Sperling was elected a member of the National Academy of Medicine for "pioneering clinical research that revolutionized the concept of preclinical Alzheimer’s disease."
