= Nathan Shock =

Nathan W. Shock (1906–1989) was an American scientist who pioneered the field of gerontology.

Known in the American scientific community as the "father of gerontology," Shock led a 35-year career at the National Institutes of Health which included directorships of the Gerontology Research Center and the National Institute on Aging.

Shock was one of the first scientists to apply longitudinal study methods to human aging. He measured the rate at which different organs of the body age and showed that different individuals age at different rates.

He was the author of more than 300 journal articles and books, and detailed his research in Scientific American 206:100-10, 1962.

== Education ==
Shock earned his B.S. in chemistry in 1926 and his M.S. in organic chemistry in 1927, both from Purdue University. He earned his Ph.D. in psychology from the University of Chicago in 1930.
