= Elysium Health =

American manufacturer of dietary supplements

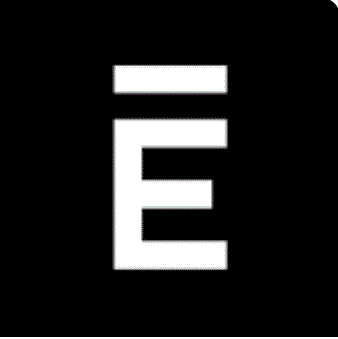
- Company type: Private
- Industry: Dietary supplements
- Founded: 2014; 12 years ago
- Founders: Leonard Guarente; Eric Marcotulli; Dan Alminana
- Headquarters: New York City, New York, U.S.
- Website: elysiumhealth.com

Elysium Health is an American manufacturer of dietary supplements based in New York City.

== History ==
Elysium Health was founded in 2014 by Leonard Guarente, Dan Alminana, and Eric Marcotulli. In 2015, Elysium introduced its first product, Basis, which contains nicotinamide riboside and pterostilbene.

In December 2016, Elysium received an investment of $20 million in Series B funding. In 2019, Elysium introduced a test called Index that uses epigenetic analysis on saliva samples to estimate biological age.

In June 2020, Elysium launched a supplement called Matter, which purports to maintain brain health and slow brain aging/atrophy. In October 2021, Elysium launched a supplement called Format, which is associated with anti-aging and immune system support.

In 2023, Elysium launched a daily supplement called Mosaic, which claims to prevent skin aging and protect collagen. In October 2024, Elysium introduced a daily supplement called Vision, to maintain macular health and promote eye longevity.

=== Litigation ===
Elysium originally bought the ingredients in Basis from ChromaDex, which as of December 2016, sold the two ingredients to other supplement companies that also marketed products containing them. The two companies had an agreement under which Elysium Health did not have to acknowledge ChromaDex as the source of the ingredients, but then after Elysium recruited the VP of business development from ChromaDex and reportedly stopped paying ChromaDex, ChromaDex sued Elysium and the information became public.

In September 2018, Dartmouth College and ChromaDex sued Elysium for infringing on patents for nicotinamide riboside. In August 2020, W.R. Grace and Company also sued Elysium for infringing on their patents for crystalline nicotinamide riboside. In September 2021, the claims by Dartmouth and ChromaDex were dismissed by a U.S. district judge, essentially invalidating their patents.

In February 2023, the United States Court of Appeals for the Federal Circuit affirmed the district court’s judgment that these patent infringement claims are invalid under 35 U.S.C. § 101.
