= Brian K. Kennedy =

American biologist

- Born: January 30, 1967 (age 59); Louisville, Kentucky, United States
- Education: Northwestern University; Massachusetts Institute of Technology
- Scientific career
- Workplaces: National University of Singapore; Buck Institute for Research on Aging; University of Washington; Guangdong Medical College
- Doctoral advisor: Leonard P. Guarente

Brian K. Kennedy is a scientist, performing research on the science of aging and healthy longevity. Since 2017, he has served as a Distinguished Professor in Biochemistry and Physiology at the Yong Loo Lin School of Medicine in the National University of Singapore, where he is currently the Director of the Healthy Longevity Translational Research Programme and the Asian Centre for Reproductive Longevity and Equality.

== Biography ==
Kennedy received his undergraduate degree at Northwestern University before completing a Ph.D. in biology at M.I.T. He initiated aging studies at this time and, working with Leonard Guarente and Nicanor Austriaco, published the first paper linking sirtuins to aging in yeast. After a postdoctoral fellowship at MGH Cancer Center, he became an Assistant and later associate professor in the Biochemistry Department at the University of Washington. During this window and working with Matt Kaeberlein, he was a co-author of a 2005 study reporting that components of the nutrient-responsive TOR pathway regulate replicative life span in yeast. In 2010, joined the Buck Institute for Research on Aging, serving as president and CEO until 2016 and remaining on the faculty until 2020. He has also directed a laboratory at Guangdong Medical College from 2006 to 2012 in China.

Kennedy has more recently focused efforts on extending the human lifespan and health span. His research is currently focused on developing and validating interventions to delay aging and generating better biomarkers of biological aging. Kennedy has argued that targeting aging directly could extend human healthspan by delaying multiple chronic diseases.
