= Journal of Alzheimer's Disease =

- Discipline: Alzheimer's disease
- Language: English
- Edited by: George Perry

Publication details
- History: 1998–present
- Publisher: IOS Press
- Frequency: 24/year
- Impact factor: 4.472 (2020)

Standard abbreviations
- ISO 4: J. Alzheimer's Dis.
- NLM: J Alzheimers Dis

Indexing
- CODEN: JADIF9
- ISSN: 1387-2877 (print); 1875-8908 (web)
- OCLC no.: 41219744

Links
- Journal homepage; Online access

The Journal of Alzheimer's Disease is a peer-reviewed medical journal published by IOS Press covering the etiology, pathogenesis, epidemiology, genetics, treatment, and psychology of Alzheimer's disease. The journal publishes research reports, reviews, short communications, hypotheses, ethics reviews, book reviews, and letters-to-the-editor. The editor-in-chief is George Perry of the University of Texas at San Antonio. According to the Journal Citation Reports, the journal has a 2020 impact factor of 4.472.

== Alzheimer Award ==
Each year, the Associate Editors of the journal select the best article from the previous year's volume. The awardee is presented the Alzheimer Medal, a 3" bronze medal with the likeness of Alois Alzheimer. This yearly award is sponsored by IOS Press and the winner of the Alzheimer Award receives a US$7,500 cash prize.
