= Guangdong Medical University =

Provincial public university in Zhanjiang, Guangdong, China

Coordinates: 23.132869°N 113.255465°E

- 广东医科大学 (Chinese)
- Motto: 立志立德、求真求精
- Motto in English: Virtue-cultivating, Ambition-inspiring, Truth-seeking, Excellence-achieving
- Type: Public university
- Established: 1958; 68 years ago
- Location: Zhanjiang, Guangdong, China
- Website: GDMU English Website; GDMU Chinese Website

Chinese name
- Simplified Chinese: 广东医科大学
- Traditional Chinese: 廣東醫科大學
Transcriptions
Standard Mandarin
- Hanyu Pinyin: Guǎngdōng Yīkēdàxué
Yue: Cantonese
- Jyutping: gwong2 dung1 ji1 fo1 daai6 hok6

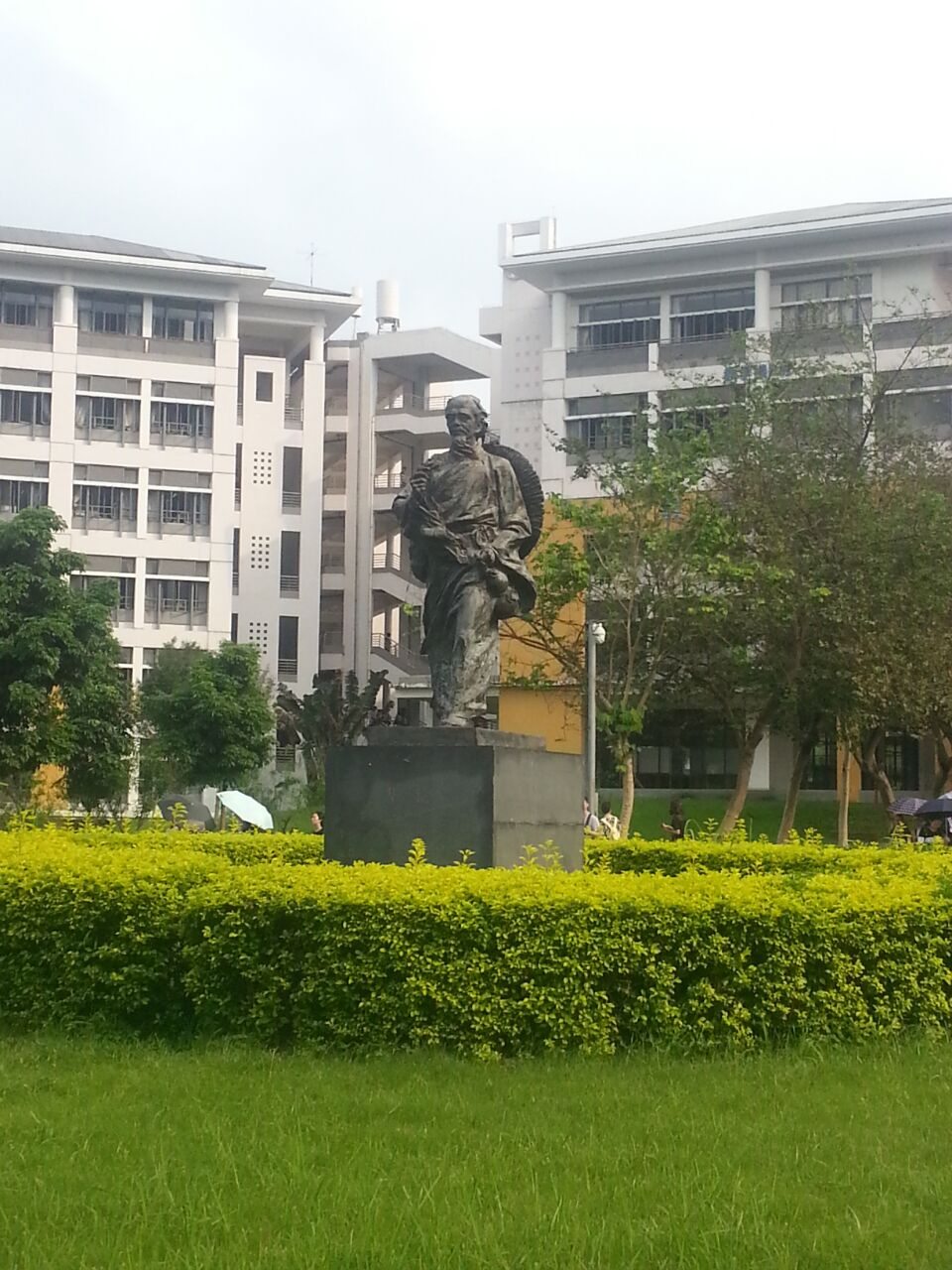
A statue of ancient Chinese physician Hua Tuo at the Dongguan campus.

Guangdong Medical University (广东医科大学) is a provincial public medical school in Zhanjiang, Guangdong, China. The school is affiliated with the Province of Guangdong.

== History ==
Guangdong Medical College, the former Zhanjiang Branch of the Sun Yatsen Medical College, was established on May 23, 1958. In February 1964, the college was renamed Zhanjiang Medical College, then in September 1992, with the approval of the Provincial Government of Guangdong, it was renamed Guangdong Medical College.

In March 2016, Guangdong Medical College was renamed Guangdong Medical University by the Ministry of Education of China.

== Location ==
GDMU has two campuses. The Zhanjiang campus is located in the seaport city of Zhanjiang. The Dongguan campus, which admitted its first students in 2003, is located in the scenic Songshan Lake Science and Technology and Industry Park in southern Dongguan.
