= GeroScience =

- Discipline: Aging
- Language: English
- Edited by: Zoltan Ungvari, MD, PhD, Veronica Galvan, PhD

Publication details
- Former names: Age, Journal of the American Aging Association
- History: 1978–present
- Publisher: Springer (Netherlands)
- Frequency: Monthly
- Impact factor: 4.9 (2024)

Standard abbreviations
- ISO 4: GeroScience

Indexing
- ISSN: 0161-9152 (print); 1574-4647 (web)

Links
- Journal homepage

GeroScience (formerly Age; Journal of the American Aging Association) is a scientific journal focused on the biology of aging and on mechanistic studies using clinically relevant models of aging and chronic age-related diseases. The journal also publishes articles on health-related aspects of human aging, including biomarkers of aging, multisystem physiology of aging and pathophysiology of age-related diseases.

== Topics ==
GeroScience covers topics like chronic low-grade inflammation, cellular senescence, macromolecular damage, oxidative-nitrative stress, maladaptation to cellular and molecular stresses, impaired stem cell function and regeneration, alterations in proteostasis, epigenetic dysregulation, impaired mitochondrial function and cellular metabolism; strategies to improve cardiovascular, neurocognitive, and musculoskeletal health-span; studies using a variety of experimental approaches, including in vivo studies and investigations using isolated tissue preparations and cultured cells; the molecular and cellular mechanisms underlying aging processes; evolutionary biology, biophysics, genetics, genomics, proteomics, molecular biology, cell biology, biochemistry, alternative and complementary medicine (including studies on natural compounds in the context of aging research), gerontology and geriatrics, endocrinology, immunology, physiology, pharmacology, neuroscience, and veterinary sciences (including veterinary pathology). GeroScience also publishes articles in areas of public health and epidemiology relevant for healthy aging. Additionally, GeroScience is a prime outlet for COVID-19 clinical, pathophysiological, immunological and public health-relevant research. GeroScience is currently ranked #4/99 in Geriatrics and Gerontology, #1/86 in Complementary and Alternative Medicine, #5/35 in Biochemistry, Genetics and Molecular Biology/Aging, #1/16 in Veterinary medicine and #21/317 in Cardiology and Cardiovascular Medicine. The 2020 CiteScore value of GeroScience is 9.5 (Elsevier/Scopus). The 2024 Impact Factor of GeroScience is 4.9 (Clarivate Analytics).

== Management ==
It is published by Springer Science+Business Media. The editors-in-chief are Zoltan Ungvari and Veronica Galvan.
