= Discovery Medicine =

Discovery Medicine is an open-access medical journal established in 2001. It is abstracted and indexed in MEDLINE/PubMed. The editor-in-chief is Jun-Li Liu (Research Institute of McGill University Health Center). According to the Journal Citation Reports, the journal has a 2022 impact factor of 1.4.
