= Ellison Medical Foundation =

Charity of philanthropist Larry Ellison

- Formation: 1997
- Founded at: Bethesda, Maryland
- Type: Private
- Purpose: Medical research
- Website: ellisonfoundation.org

The Ellison Medical Foundation, a 501(c)(3) Private Nonoperating Foundation, was founded in 1997 and is located in Bethesda, Maryland. The foundation supported research in the following discipline areas: biomedical research on aging, age-related diseases and disabilities. Its major financial support came from Oracle's CEO Larry Ellison. As of 2007, the foundation owned 1.3 million shares of Oracle Corporation.

The foundation is classified as NTEE T99—Other Philanthropy, Voluntarism, and Grantmaking Foundations N.E.C.

Since 1998 the Ellison Medical Foundation has spent hundreds of millions of dollars funding fundamental research on the biology of ageing. Forty million dollars per year was given to 25 Senior Scholars and 25 New Scholars. The Senior Scholars received $1 million each and the New Scholars received $400,000 each for four years of research.

In late summer/early fall 2013 the Ellison Medical Foundation announced that it "will no longer be accepting new applications for New and Senior Scholar awards in Aging, Neuroscience, or other biomedical research topics. All currently funded awards will continue ... but no new applications or letters of intent will be accepted for these or other grant programs."
