= Gerontological Society of America =

Multidisciplinary organization

- Abbreviation: GSA
- Formation: 1945
- Founded at: New York City
- Type: Multidisciplinary organization
- Purpose: Research and education of gerontology: medical biological psychological social
- Main organ: The Journals of Gerontology

The Gerontological Society of America (GSA) is a multidisciplinary organization devoted to research and education in all aspects of gerontology: medical, biological, psychological and social.

== History and organization ==
The Gerontological Society of America (GSA) was incorporated in New York City in 1945 as an outgrowth of a group of scientists and physicians who had been calling themselves "the Club for Research on Ageing" since the 1930s. GSA has been holding scientific conferences since 1946.

In 1969, GSA moved its main office from St. Louis, Missouri to Washington, D.C. The Gerontological Society of America, along with the American Geriatrics Society advocated for the formation of a National Gerontological Institute. These efforts bore fruit in 1974 when President Richard Nixon signed legislation to create the National Institute on Aging (NIA).

In 1946, GSA began publishing Journal of Gerontology.

In 1961, material in Journal of Gerontology dealing with GSA organization and activities was moved to a new journal called The Gerontologist.

In 1988, Journal of Gerontology was renamed Journals of Gerontology to reflect the fact that it was a composite of four journals having four separate editors.

In 1995, the four journals being published under one cover were split into two magazines ("two covers"): (1) the Journals of Gerontology: Biological Sciences and Medical Sciences and (2) the Journals of Gerontology: Psychological Sciences and Social Sciences. Also in 1995 GSA began publishing The Public Policy and Aging Report to deal specifically with policy issues, and directed to those outside as well as within the academic community.

== Activities ==
The primary activities of GSA are to:

1. Publish peer-reviewed journals
2. Publish special books and papers
3. Organize congressional briefings
4. Promote gerontology in higher education
5. Promote gerontology in public policy
6. Organize an Annual Scientific Meeting
7. Provide continuing education in gerontology

== Special units ==
The Gerontological Society of America is also home to two special units: the Association for Gerontology in Higher Education, and the National Academy on an Aging Society.

== Member sections ==
GSA is also home to six member-focused sections:

- Academy for Gerontology in Higher Education
- Behavioral and Social Sciences
- Biological Sciences
- Emerging Scholar and Professional Organization
- Health Sciences
- Social Research, Policy, and Practice

Each section has its own bylaws, officers, and activities.

Student members, in addition to joining the Society and an appropriate section, also join the Emerging Scholar and Professional Organization (ESPO).

The highest status of membership in the GSA is that of "fellow"; a title of honor with the post-nominals of "FGSA" is conferred after an election through one of the focused sections, based on the scholar's exemplary body of work and achievements.

== See also ==
- Ageing
- American Aging Association
- Geriatrics
- Gerontology
- Senescence
