= Melanie Ott =

German virologist (born 1964)

- Born: 1964 (age 61–62); Frankfurt, Germany
- Education: University of Frankfurt/Main; Picower Graduate School Of Molecular Medicine
- Scientific career
- Workplaces: Gladstone Institutes, University of California, San Francisco
- Doctoral advisor: Eric M. Verdin
- Website: ottlab.gladstone.org

Melanie Ott is a German virologist who is a senior investigator of The Ott Lab, Director the Gladstone Institute of Virology, and Senior Vice President of Gladstone Institutes. She is also a Professor of Medicine at the University of California, San Francisco.

== Education and early career ==
Ott was born and raised in Frankfurt, Germany. She received her Doctor of Medicine degree in 1991 from the University of Frankfurt/Main. From 1991 to 1994, she led the ICU unit at Goethe University Hospital. There, 90 percent of the patients were HIV positive and all died without any treatments available. While she was originally trained as a neurologist, her experience during the HIV/AIDS crisis drew her to virology with the hopes that she could contribute to better treatments—and eventually a cure.

In 1994, Ott moved to New York to pursue her Doctorate in Molecular Medicine from the Picower Graduate School Of Molecular Medicine, now known as the Elmezzi Graduate School of Molecular Medicine. There, she worked in the laboratory of Eric M. Verdin where she studied gene regulation and epigenetic related to HIV infection. After she graduated in 1997, Ott became a Junior Investigator at the German Cancer Research Center in Heidelberg, Germany where she remained until 2002.

== Research ==
In 2002, Ott joined the Gladstone Institutes, an independent research center affiliated with University of California, San Francisco. Her research group, The Ott Lab, focuses on understanding how viruses interact with and hijack the host cells they infect, studying HIV, the Hepatitis C virus, and Zika virus. In light of the COVID-19 pandemic, her research group has also taken on studying COVID-19 (SARS-CoV-2).

=== HIV research ===
Ott has worked to understand HIV transcription and viral latency within host cells as targets to eradicate the spread of the virus. HIV inserts its genome into its host cell's DNA; in this form, the virus is known as a provirus. While antiretrovial drugs are able to prevent the spread of actively transcribed and replicating HIV, they cannot target HIV provirus that is laying dormant in the host genome. Eliminating latent provirus is therefore essential for eradicating the virus. Ott and her team have worked on developing a "shock and kill" strategy to reactivate and flush out latent HIV provirus so that the immune system and antiretroviral drug therapies can kill off dormant viruses. Her laboratory has been exploring repurposing cancer drug therapies that target epigenetic machinery to reactivate latent HIV provirus. They have studied both the effect of inhibiting the function of deacetylases to loosen the host's heterochromatin structures to restart HIV transcription and of activating the viral transcription protein Tat. In a 2017 study, they targeted the human enzyme SMPD2, which allows HIV to remain latent. They were able to reactivate latent provirus in about one-quarter of human cells donated by HIV patients.

=== COVID-19 research ===
Ott is a member of UCSF's Quantitative Biosciences Institute's COVID-19 consortium. In the wake of the COVID-19 pandemic, Ott and her team of collaborators worked to reequip and recertify an unused biosafety level 3 (BSL-3) research laboratory at University of California, San Francisco in order to study SARS-CoV-2, the virus responsible for COVID-19. A BSL-3 laboratory allows researchers to study infectious agents, such as novel coronaviruses, which can cause serious diseases in humans. Her team also received training in how to work with the virus without risking infection, though Ott has commented to the press that the limited stock of personal protective equipment is a cause for concern as they proceed with their research.

Ott and her team began working to understand how COVID-19 reproduce in a host in order to understand how to disrupt the virus's life cycle using drugs. They began infecting lung organoids with the virus to both understand its pathogenesis, as well as identify potential drugs to stop its spread. She is also collaborating with Jennifer Doudna at University of California, Berkeley to develop a rapid CRISPR-based diagnostic test for the virus that would show results within 30 minutes.

== Selected publications ==
- "Metabolic reprogramming of human CD8+ memory T cells through loss of SIRT1." Journal of Experimental Medicine. 2018 Jan 2;215(1):51-62. doi:10.1084/jem.20161066
- "The Short Isoform of BRD4 Promotes HIV-1 Latency by Engaging Repressive SWI/SNF Chromatin-Remodeling Complexes." Molecular Cell 2017 Sep 21;67(6):1001-1012.e6. doi:10.1016/j.molcel.2017.07.025
- "A combined proteomics/genomics approach links hepatitis C virus infection with nonsense-mediated mRNA decay." Molecular Cell 2015 Jan 22;57(2):329-340. doi:10.1016/j.molcel.2014.12.028
- "Acetylation of RNA Polymerase II Regulates Growth-Factor-Induced Gene Transcription in Mammalian Cells." Molecular Cell 2013 Nov 7;52(3):314-24. doi:10.1016/j.molcel.2013.10.009
- "Efficient hepatitis C virus particle formation requires diacylglycerol acyltransferase-1." Nature Medicine 2010 Nov;16(11):1295-8. doi:10.1038/nm.2238

== Awards and honors ==
- Young Researcher Award, European Conference on Experimental AIDS Research, 1999–2000
- F. Warren Hellman Award, University of California, San Francisco, 2006–2007
- Chancellor's Award for Public Service, University of California, San Francisco, 2008
- Avant-Garde Awardee, National Institute on Drug Abuse, 2014
- Fellow, American Academy of Microbiology, 2017
