= List of Sigma Xi chapters =

Sigma Xi is an international scientific research honor society. In addition to collegiate chapters, the society maintains area and company-based chapters. Following is a list of Sigma Xi chapters, with active chapters indicated in bold and inactive chapters or institutions are in italics.

Chapter	Charter date and range	Institution or area	Location	Status	Ref.
**Cornell**	November 1886	Cornell University	Ithaca, New York	Active	
**R.P.I.**	1887	Rensselaer Polytechnic Institute	Troy, New York	Active	
**Union**	1887	Union College	Schenectady, New York	Active	
**Kansas**	1890	University of Kansas	Lawrence, Kansas	Active	
**Yale**	1895	Yale University	New Haven, Connecticut	Active	
**Minnesota**	1896	University of Minnesota	Minneapolis, Minnesota	Active	
**Nebraska**	1897	University of Nebraska–Lincoln	Lincoln, Nebraska	Active	
**Ohio State**	1898	Ohio State University	Columbus, Ohio	Active	
**Penn**	1899	University of Pennsylvania	Philadelphia, Pennsylvania	Active	
**Brown**	1900	Brown University	Providence, Rhode Island	Active	
**Iowa**	1900	University of Iowa	Iowa City, Iowa	Active	
**Stanford**	1901	Stanford University	Stanford, California	Active	
**California**	1902	University of California, Berkeley	Berkeley, California	Active	
**Columbia**	1902	Columbia University	New York City, New York	Active	
**Chicago**	1903	University of Chicago	Chicago, Illinois	Active	
**Michigan**	1903	University of Michigan	Ann Arbor, Michigan	Active	
**Case Western Reserve**	1904	Case Western Reserve University	Cleveland, Ohio	Active	(Note: Chapter formed at Case Institute of Technology. It consolidated with the Western Reserve chapter when the two colleges merged to form Case Western Reserve University.)
**Indiana**	1904	Indiana University Bloomington	Bloomington, Indiana	Active	
**Colorado**	1905	University of Colorado Boulder	Boulder, Colorado	Active	
**Missouri**	1905	University of Missouri	Columbia, Missouri	Active	
**Northwestern**	1906	Northwestern University	Evanston, Illinois	Active	
**Syracuse**	1906	Syracuse area	Syracuse, New York	Active	(Note: Chapter was formed at Syracuse University but is now an area chapter.)
**Washington**	1907	University of Washington	Seattle, Washington	Active	
**Wisconsin, Madison**	1907	University of Wisconsin–Madison	Madison, Wisconsin	Active	
**Worcester Tech**	1908	Worcester Polytechnic Institute	Worcester, Massachusetts	Active	
**Purdue**	1909	Purdue University	West Lafayette, Indiana	Active	
**Washington (MO)**	1910	Washington University in St. Louis	St. Louis, Missouri	Active	
**District of Columbia**	1915	District of Columbia area	Washington, D.C.	Active	(Note: The District of Columbia chapter is an area chapter serving members in the District of Columbia, Maryland, and Virginia metro area.)
**Texas**	1915	University of Texas at Austin	Austin, Texas	Active	
**Mayo Foundation**	1920	Mayo Clinic	Rochester, Minnesota	Active	
**North Carolina**	1920	University of North Carolina at Chapel Hill	Chapel Hill, North Carolina	Active	
**North Dakota**	1920	University of North Dakota	Grand Forks, North Dakota	Active	
**Iowa State**	1921	Iowa State University	Ames, Iowa	Active	
**Idaho**	1922	University of Idaho	Moscow, Idaho	Active	
**Kentucky**	1922	University of Kentucky	Lexington, Kentucky	Active	
**McGill**	1922	McGill community	Montreal, Quebec, Canada	Active	(Note: Chapter was originally associated with McGill University but is now a community chapter.)
**Rutgers**	1922	Rutgers University–New Brunswick	Piscataway, New Jersey	Active	
**Oregon**	1923	University of Oregon	Eugene, Oregon	Active	
**Swarthmore**	1923	Swarthmore College	Swarthmore, Pennsylvania	Active	
**Caltech**	1924	California Institute of Technology	Pasadena, California	Active	
**Johns Hopkins**	1924	Johns Hopkins University	Baltimore, Maryland	Active	
**Virginia**	1924	University of Virginia	Charlottesville, Virginia	Active	
**Cincinnati**	1926	University of Cincinnati	Cincinnati, Ohio	Active	
**NYU**	1926	New York University	New York City, New York	Active	
**Michigan State**	1927	Michigan State University	East Lansing, Michigan	Active	
**Arizona**	1928	University of Arizona	Tucson, Arizona	Active	
**Duke**	1928	Duke University	Durham, North Carolina	Active	
Illinois, Chicago Medicine	1928–19xx ?	University of Illinois College of Medicine	Chicago, Illinois	Inactive	
**Kansas State**	1928	Kansas State University	Manhattan, Kansas	Active	
**Lehigh**	1928	Lehigh University	Bethlehem, Pennsylvania	Active	
**Maryland**	1928	University of Maryland, College Park	College Park, Maryland	Active	
**Oklahoma**	1930	University of Oklahoma	Norman, Oklahoma	Active	
**Penn State**	1930	Pennsylvania State University	University Park, Pennsylvania	Active	
**Rochester**	1930	University of Rochester	Rochester, New York	Active	
**Washington State**	1930	Washington State University	Pullman, Washington	Active	
**Wyoming**	1930	Wyoming statewide	Laramie, Wyoming	Active	(Note: Chapter formed at the University of Wyoming but is now a statewide chapter.)
**Harvard**	1931	Harvard University	Cambridge, Massachusetts	Active	
**Pitt**	1931	University of Pittsburgh	Pittsburgh, Pennsylvania	Active	
**Princeton**	1932	Princeton University	Princeton, New Jersey	Active	
Western Reserve	1932	Western Reserve University	Cleveland, Ohio	Consolidated	(Note: Chapter consolidated with the Case Institute of Technology chapter to form the Case Western Reserve chapter when the two colleges merged.)
**UCLA**	1933	University of California, Los Angeles	Los Angeles, California	Active	
**MIT**	1934	Massachusetts Institute of Technology	Cambridge, Massachusetts	Active	
**Greater New Orleans**	1934	Greater New Orleans	New Orleans, Louisiana	Active	(Note: Chapter formed at Tulane University but now includes the Great New Orleans area.)
**Carleton**	1935	Carleton College	Northfield, Minnesota	Active	
**Smith**	1935	Smith College	Northampton, Massachusetts	Active	
**Wesleyan**	1935	Wesleyan University	Middletown, Connecticut	Active	
**SUNY Buffalo**	1936	University at Buffalo	Buffalo, New York	Active	
**Carnegie Mellon**	1937	Carnegie Mellon University	Pittsburgh, Pennsylvania	Active	(Note: Chapter formed at Carnegie Tech, now Carnegie Mellon University.)
**George Washington**	1937	George Washington University	Washington, D.C.	Active	
**Oregon State**	1937	Oregon State University	Corvallis, Oregon	Active	
**Utah**	1937	University of Utah	Salt Lake City, Utah	Active	
**Florida**	1938	University of Florida	Gainesville, Florida	Active	
**Massachusetts**	1938	University of Massachusetts Amherst	Amherst, Massachusetts	Active	
**Rice**	1938	Rice University Texas Medical Center	Houston, Texas	Active	
**Wellesley**	1938	Wellesley College	Wellesley, Massachusetts	Active	
**Alabama**	1939	University of Alabama	Tuscaloosa, Alabama	Active	
**West Virginia**	1939	West Virginia University	Morgantown, West Virginia	Active	
**USC**	1940	University of Southern California	Los Angeles, California	Active	
**Virginia Tech**	1940	Virginia Tech	Blacksburg, Virginia	Active	
**Bryn Mawr**	1941	Bryn Mawr College	Bryn Mawr, Pennsylvania	Active	
**Oberlin**	1941	Oberlin College	Cleveland, Ohio	Active	
**Illinois State/Illinois Wesleyan**	1942	Illinois State University and Illinois Wesleyan University	Normal, Illinois	Active	
**Illinois Tech**	1942	Illinois Institute of Technology	Chicago, Illinois	Active	
**LSU**	1942	Louisiana State University	Baton Rouge, Louisiana	Active	
**Utah State**	1942	Utah State University	Logan, Utah	Active	
**Polytechnic/SUNY Old Westbury**	1943	New York Institute of Technology	Old Westbury, New York	Active	(Note: This chapter originated in 1943 at the Brooklyn-based New York Technical Institute, and was called the Brooklyn Tech chapter. After school mergers, it is now located at Old Westbury on Long Island and called the Polytechnic/SUNY Old Westbury chapter.)
Radcliffe	1943–19xx ?	Radcliffe College	Cambridge, Massachusetts	Inactive	
**Tufts**	1943	Tufts University	Medford, Massachusetts	Active	
**Emory**	1944	Emory University	Atlanta, Georgia	Active	
**NC State**	1944	North Carolina State University	Raleigh, North Carolina	Active	
**St. Louis University**	1944	Saint Louis University	St. Louis, Missouri	Active	
**Vanderbilt**	1944	Vanderbilt University	Nashville, Tennessee	Active	
**Wayne State**	1944	Wayne State University	Detroit, Michigan	Active	
**Catholic**	1945	Catholic University of America	Washington, D.C.	Active	
**Connecticut**	1945	University of Connecticut	Storrs, Connecticut	Active	
**Texas Southwestern Medical Center**	1945	University of Texas Southwestern Medical Center	Dallas, Texas	Active	
**Georgia**	1946	University of Georgia	Athens, Georgia	Active	
State University of West Georgia	1946–c. 1986	State University of West Georgia	Carrollton, Georgia	Inactive	
**Vermont**	1946	Vermont statewide	Northfield, Vermont	Active	(Note: Chapter formed at the University of Vermont but is now a statewide chapter.)
**California Davis**	1947	University of California, Davis	Davis, California	Active	
**Hawaii**	1947	University of Hawaiʻi at Mānoa	Manoa, Hawaii	Active	
**Rockford**	1947	Rockford University	Rockford, Illinois	Active	
**Maine**	1948	University of Maine	Orono, Maine	Active	
**San Diego**	1948	San Diego area	San Diego, California	Active	
**Frederick**	1949	Frederick and Rockville area	Rockville, Maryland	Active	
**Oklahoma State**	1949	Oklahoma State University–Stillwater	Stillwater, Oklahoma	Active	
**Temple**	1949	Temple University	Philadelphia, Pennsylvania	Active	
**Amherst**	1950	Amherst College	Amherst, Massachusetts	Active	
**Auburn**	1950	Auburn University	Auburn, Alabama	Active	
**Brigham Young**	1950	Brigham Young University	Provo, Utah	Active	
**CDC**	1950	Centers for Disease Control and Prevention	Atlanta, Georgia	Active	
**Denver**	1950	University of Denver	Denver, Colorado	Active	
**Montana State**	1950	Montana State University	Bozeman, Montana	Active	
**Naval Research Laboratory-Edison**	1950	United States Naval Research Laboratory - Edison	Washington, D.C.	Active	
**Tennessee**	1950	University of Tennessee	Knoxville, Tennessee	Active	
**NYU Dentistry**	1951	New York University College of Dentistry	New York City, New York	Active	
**Texas A&M**	July 1, 1951	Texas A&M University	College Station, Texas	Active	
**Alfred**	1952	Alfred University	Alfred, New York	Active	
**Argonne**	1952	Argonne National Laboratory	Argonne, Illinois	Active	
**Boston**	1952	Boston University	Boston, Massachusetts	Active	
**Notre Dame**	1952	University of Notre Dame	Notre Dame, Indiana	Active	
**Columbia-Willamette**	1952	Columbia River and Willamette River area	Portland, Oregon	Active	(Note: Originally chartered as the Oregon Medical and Dental area chapter.)
**Kansas City**	1952	Kansas City area	Kansas City, Missouri	Active	
**Triple Cities New York**	1952	Binghamton area	Binghamton, New York	Active	
**Alamo**	1953	San Antonio area	San Antonio, Texas	Active	
**Arconic**	1953	New Kensington area	New Kensington, Pennsylvania	Active	(Note: Chapter was formed at the Alcoa Technical Center, now called Arconic Technology Center.)
**Arkansas**	1953	University of Arkansas	Fayetteville, Arkansas	Active	
**Colorado State**	1953	Colorado State University	Fort Collins, Colorado	Active	
**Georgia Institute of Technology**	1953	Georgia Tech	Atlanta, Georgia	Active	
**Rhode Island**	1953	University of Rhode Island	Kingston, Rhode Island	Active	
**Rollins College**	1953	Rollins College	Winter Park, Florida	Active	
**Tuskegee University**	1953	Tuskegee University	Tuskegee, Alabama	Active	
**Brooklyn**	1954	Brooklyn College	Brooklyn, New York	Active	
**Franklin and Marshall**	1954	Franklin & Marshall College	Lancaster, Pennsylvania	Active	
**Lamar**	1954	Lamar University	Beaumont, Texas	Active	
**Missouri S&T**	1954	Missouri University of Science and Technology	Rolla, Missouri	Active	(Note: Chapter formed at the Missouri School of Mines and Metallurgy, now called Missouri University of Science and Technology.)
**New Hampshire**	1954	University of New Hampshire	Durham, New Hampshire	Active	
**New Mexico**	1954	University of New Mexico	Albuquerque, New Mexico	Active	
**Stevens Tech**	1954	Stevens Institute of Technology	Hoboken, New Jersey	Active	
**Texas, Medical**	1954	University of Texas Medical Branch	Galveston, Texas	Active	
**Florida State**	1955	Florida State University	Tallahassee, Florida	Active	
**Louisville**	1955	Louisville area	Louisville, Kentucky	Active	(Note: The chapter formed at the University of Louisville but is now an area chapter.)
**Loyola, Chicago**	1955	Loyola University Chicago	Chicago, Illinois	Active	
Tennessee, Medical	1956		Tennessee	Inactive	
**Texas Woman's University**	1956	Texas Woman's University	Denton, Texas	Active	
**Chesapeake**	1957	Aberdeen Proving Ground	Aberdeen, Maryland	Active	
**Alabama, Birmingham**	1957	University of Alabama at Birmingham	Birmingham, Alabama	Active	
**Army Research Laboratory**	1957	United States Army Research Laboratory	Adelphi, Maryland	Active	
**Denison**	1957	Denison University	Granville, Ohio	Active	
**Howard**	1957	Howard University	Washington, D.C.	Active	
**Natick**	1957	Natick area	Natick, Massachusetts	Active	
**New Mexico State**	1957	New Mexico State University	Las Cruces, New Mexico	Active	
**Ohio Wesleyan**	1957	Ohio Wesleyan University	Delaware, Ohio	Active	
**South Dakota**	1957	University of South Dakota	Vermillion, South Dakota	Active	
**Fordham**	1958	Fordham University	The Bronx, New York	Active	
**Louisiana Tech**	1958	Louisiana Tech University	Ruston, Louisiana	Active	
**Naval Postgraduate School**	1958	Naval Postgraduate School	Monterey, California	Active	
**Rockefeller**	1958	Rockefeller University	New York City, New York	Active	
**South Carolina**	1958	University of South Carolina	Columbia, South Carolina	Active	
**Tahoma**	1958	Tahoma area	Puyallup, Washington	Active	
**Andrews-Whirlpool**	1959	Andrews University and Whirlpool Corporation	Berrien Springs, Michigan	Active	
**Delaware**	1959	University of Delaware	Newark, Delaware	Active	
**Knox**	1959	Knox College	Galesburg, Illinois	Active	
**Vassar**	1959	Vassar College	Poughkeepsie, New York	Active	
**Albion**	1960	Albion College	Albion, Michigan	Active	
**Claremont Colleges**	1960	Claremont McKenna College, Harvey Mudd College, and Pomona College	Claremont, California	Active	
**Jacksonville**	1960	Jacksonville area	Jacksonville, Florida	Active	
**Marquette**	1960	Marquette University	Milwaukee, Wisconsin	Active	
**New Mexico Highlands**	1960	New Mexico Highlands University	Las Vegas, New Mexico	Active	
**San Francisco State**	1960	San Francisco State University	San Francisco, California	Active	
**Texas Tech**	1960	Texas Tech University	Lubbock, Texas	Active	
**University of Massachusetts Lowell**	1960	University of Massachusetts Lowell	Lowell, Massachusetts	Active	
**Eckerd**	1961	Eckerd College	St. Petersburg, Florida	Active	
**Ohio**	1961	Ohio University	Athens, Ohio	Active	
**Puerto Rico at Mayaguez**	1961	University of Puerto Rico at Mayagüez	Mayagüez, Puerto Rico	Active	
**South Dakota State**	1961	South Dakota State University	Brookings, South Dakota	Active	
**Ball State**	1962	Ball State University	Muncie, Indiana	Active	
Chicago Medical	1962		Chicago, Illinois	Inactive	
**SUNY Stony Brook**	1962	Stony Brook University	Stony Brook, New York	Active	
**Tidewater Virginia**	1962	Tidewater	Newport News, Virginia	Active	(Note: This chapter serves Newport University, Eastern Virginia Medical School, Hampton University, Norfolk State University, Old Dominion University, and the surrounding area.)
**Whitman College-Walla Walla University**	1962	Whitman College and Walla Walla University	Walla Walla, Washington	Active	
**Central Arkansas**	1963	Central Arkansas area	Little Rock, Arkansas	Active	
**California Riverside**	1963	University of California, Riverside	Riverside, California	Active	
**VCU**	1963	Virginia Commonwealth University	Richmond, Virginia	Active	(Note: This chapter was formed at Virginia Medical School which merged to form VCU.)
**North Dakota State**	1963	North Dakota State University	Fargo, North Dakota	Active	
**American University**	1964	American University	Washington, D.C.	Active	
**Montana**	1964	University of Montana	Missoula, Montana	Active	
**Wichita State**	1964	Wichita State University	Wichita, Kansas	Active	
**Arizona State**	1965	Arizona State University	Phoenix, Arizona	Active	
**Black Hills Regional**	1965	Black Hills region	Rapid City, South Dakota	Active	
**Cincinnati Federal Environmental**	1965	United States Environmental Protection Agency Cincinnati	Cincinnati, Ohio	Active	
**Colorado Mines**	1965	Colorado School of Mines	Golden, Colorado	Active	
**Hamilton**	1965	Hamilton College	Clinton, New York	Active	
**Marshall**	1965	Marshall University	Huntington, West Virginia	Active	
**Merrimack**	1965	Merrimack College	North Andover, Massachusetts	Active	
**Northeastern**	1965	Northeastern University	Boston, Massachusetts	Active	
**Orange County**	1965	Orange County	San Clemente, California	Active	
South Dakota Mines	1965	South Dakota School of Mines and Technology	Rapid City, South Dakota	Inactive	
**SUNY Plattsburgh**	1965	State University of New York at Plattsburgh	Plattsburgh, New York	Active	
**Tulsa**	1965	Tulsa area	Tulsa, Oklahoma	Active	
**Wake Forest**	1965	Wake Forest University	Winston-Salem, North Carolina	Active	
**Wisconsin-Oshkosh**	1965	University of Wisconsin–Oshkosh	Oshkosh, Wisconsin	Active	
Boston College	1966	Boston College	Chestnut Hill, Massachusetts	Inactive	
**Charlotte**	1966	Charlotte area	Charlotte, North Carolina	Active	
**Clemson**	1966	Clemson University	Clemson, South Carolina	Active	
**Fairleigh Dickinson**	1966	Fairleigh Dickinson University	Teaneck, New Jersey	Active	
**Greensboro**	1966	Greensboro area	Greensboro, North Carolina	Active	
**Houston**	1966	University of Houston	Houston, Texas	Active	
**Idaho State**	1966	Idaho State University	Pocatello, Idaho	Active	
**Ithaca**	1966	Ithaca College	Ithaca, New York	Active	
**KU Med**	1966	University of Kansas Medical Center	Kansas City, Kansas	Active	
Minnesota State, Mankato	1966–1968	Minnesota State University, Mankato	Mankato, Minnesota	Inactive	
**Mississippi State**	1966	Mississippi State University	Starkville, Mississippi	Active	
**Montana Tech**	1966	Montana Technological University	Butte, Montana	Active	
**Southern Illinois Carbondale**	1966	Southern Illinois University Carbondale	Carbondale, Illinois	Active	
**SUNY Fredonia**	1966	State University of New York at Fredonia	Fredonia, New York	Active	
**Tennessee Tech**	1966	Tennessee Tech	Cookeville, Tennessee	Active	
**Ursinus**	1966	Ursinus College	Collegeville, Pennsylvania	Active	
**Weber State University**	1966	Weber State University	Ogden, Utah	Active	
**Eastern Kentucky University**	1967	Eastern Kentucky University	Richmond, Kentucky	Active	
**Eastern New Mexico University**	1967	Eastern New Mexico University	Portales, New Mexico	Active	
**Eastern Washington University Spokane**	1967	Eastern Washington University Spokane	Spokane, Washington	Active	
**Georgetown**	1967	Georgetown University	Washington, D.C.	Active	
**John Deere**	1967	John Deere	Rock Island, Illinois	Active	(Note: Chapter serves Davenport, Iowa; Bettendorf, Iowa; Rock Island, Illinois; and Moline, Illinois.)
**Kent**	1967	Kent State University	Kent, Ohio	Active	
**Loyola Marymount**	1967	Loyola Marymount University	Los Angeles, California	Active	
**Mississippi Medical**	1967	University of Mississippi Medical Center	Jackson, Mississippi	Active	
**Mount Holyoke**	1967	Mount Holyoke College	South Hadley, Massachusetts	Active	
**Northern Arizona**	1967	Northern Arizona	Flagstaff, Arizona	Active	
**Ohio Northern**	1967	Ohio Northern University	Ada, Ohio	Active	
**Puerto Rico at San Juan**	1967	University of Puerto Rico, Río Piedras Campus	San Juan, Puerto Rico	Active	
**Santa Clara**	1967	Santa Clara University	Santa Clara, California	Active	
**Sonoma State**	1967	Sonoma State University	Rohnert Park, California	Active	
**Southern Mississippi**	1967	University of Southern Mississippi	Hattiesburg, Mississippi	Active	
**Texas Christian**	1967	Texas Christian University	Fort Worth, Texas	Active	
**Thomas Jefferson**	1967	Thomas Jefferson University	Philadelphia, Pennsylvania	Active	
**Tri-Cities Washington**	1967	Richland, Kennewick, and Pasco area	Richland, Washington	Active	
**U.S. Naval Academy**	1967	United States Naval Academy	Annapolis, Maryland	Active	
**Western Kentucky**	1967	Western Kentucky University	Bowling Green, Kentucky	Active	
**Baylor**	1968	Baylor University	Waco, Texas	Active	
**Dartmouth**	1968	Dartmouth College	Hanover, New Hampshire	Active	
**Gustavus Adolphus**	1968	Gustavus Adolphus College	St. Peter, Minnesota	Active	
**Manhattan College**	1968	Manhattan College	The Bronx, New York	Active	(Note: This school was originally situated six miles south, in Manhattan.)
**Manitoba**	1968	University of Manitoba	Winnipeg, Manitoba, Canada	Active	
**Middle Tennessee State**	1968	Middle Tennessee State University	Murfreesboro, Tennessee	Active	
**Northern Michigan**	1968	Northern Michigan University	Marquette, Michigan	Active	
**Queens College**	1968	Queens College, City University of New York	Queens, New York	Active	
**Scranton**	1968	University of Scranton	Scranton, Pennsylvania	Active	
**Tifton**	1968	Tifton area	Tifton, Georgia	Active	
**Western Carolina**	1968	Western Carolina University	Cullowhee, North Carolina	Active	
**Wisconsin–La Crosse**	1968	University of Wisconsin–La Crosse	La Crosse, Wisconsin	Active	
**Appalachian State**	1969	Appalachian State University	Boone, North Carolina	Active	
**Central Florida**	1969	University of Central Florida	Orlando, Florida	Active	
**Delta**	1969	Boston area	Boston, Massachusetts	Active	
Hunter	1969	Hunter College	New York City, New York	Inactive	
**Indiana, Indianapolis Medical**	1969	Indiana University School of Medicine	Indianapolis, Indiana	Active	
**Indiana University**	1969	Indiana University of Pennsylvania	Indiana, Pennsylvania	Active	
**Miami**	1969	University of Miami	Coral Gables, Florida	Active	
**Northern Illinois**	1969	Northern Illinois University	DeKalb, Illinois	Active	
**Southern Illinois Edwardsville**	1969	Southern Illinois University Edwardsville	Edwardsville, Illinois	Active	
**SUNY Health Science Center**	April 8, 1969	SUNY Downstate Medical Center	Brooklyn, New York	Active	
**Akron**	1969	University of Akron	Akron, Ohio	Active	
**Nevada**	1969	University of Nevada, Reno	Reno, Nevada	Active	
**Rider**	1969	Rider University	Lawrence Township, New Jersey	Active	
**Williams**	1969	Williams College	Williamstown, Massachusetts	Active	
**Wright State**	1969	Wright State University	Fairborn, Ohio	Active	
**Albany, New York**	1970	Albanay area	Albany, New York	Active	(Note: Chapter originally served the University at Albany, SUNY, but is now a communitywide chapter.)
**California Santa Barbara**	1970	University of California, Santa Barbara	Santa Barbara County, California	Active	
**Central Oklahoma**	1970	University of Central Oklahoma	Edmond, Oklahoma	Active	
**Hartford**	1970	University of Hartford	West Hartford, Connecticut	Active	
**Massachusetts Dartmouth**	1970	University of Massachusetts Dartmouth	North Dartmouth, Massachusetts	Active	
**SUNY Oswego**	1970	State University of New York at Oswego	Oswego, New York	Active	
**Tennessee at Martin**	1970	University of Tennessee at Martin	Martin, Tennessee	Active	
**Youngstown State**	1970	Youngstown State University	Youngstown, Ohio	Active	
**Clarkson**	1971	Clarkson University	Potsdam, New York	Active	
**CUNY**	1971	City University of New York	New York City, New York	Active	
**East Stroudsburg**	1971	East Stroudsburg University of Pennsylvania	East Stroudsburg, Pennsylvania	Active	
**Food and Drug Administration**	1971	Food and Drug Administration	Washington, D.C.	Active	
**George Mason**	1971	George Mason University	Fairfax, Virginia	Active	
**Hampden Sydney/Longwood**	1971	Hampden–Sydney College and Longwood University	Hampden Sydney, Virginia	Active	
**Michigan Tech**	1971	Michigan Technological University	Houghton, Michigan	Active	
**Montclair State**	1971	Montclair State University	Montclair, New Jersey	Active	
**National Institute of Standards and Technology**	1971	National Institute of Standards and Technology	Gaithersburg, Maryland	Active	
**Saint Joseph's**	1971	Saint Joseph's University	Philadelphia, Pennsylvania	Active	
**Alaska**	1972	Alaska statewide	Fairbanks, Alaska	Active	
**Drexel**	1972	Drexel University	Philadelphia, Pennsylvania	Active	
**Miami (OH)**	1972	Miami University	Oxford, Ohio	Active	
**Texas, Arlington**	1972	University of Texas at Arlington	Arlington, Texas	Active	
**Mississippi**	1972	University of Mississippi	University, Mississippi	Active	
**Avalon**	1973	St. John's area	St. John's, Newfoundland and Labrador, Canada	Active	
**California State Northridge**	1973	California State University, Northridge	Northridge, Los Angeles, California	Active	
**General Motors R&D Center**	1973	General Motors Technical Center	Warren, Michigan	Active	
**Newark**	1973	Rutgers University–Newark	Newark, New Jersey	Active	
**Rush**	1973	Rush University	Chicago, Illinois	Active	
**Wisconsin-Milwaukee**	1973	University of Wisconsin–Milwaukee	Milwaukee, Wisconsin	Active	
**East Carolina**	1974	East Carolina University	Greenville, North Carolina	Active	
**Pace**	1974	Pace University	Pleasantville, New York	Active	
**Pikes Peak**	1974	Colorado College and University of Colorado Colorado Springs	Colorado Springs, Colorado	Active	
**Portland State**	1974	Portland State University	Portland, Oregon	Active	
**Boise State University**	1975	Boise State University	Boise, Idaho	Active	
**Bowling Green**	1975	Bowling Green State University	Bowling Green, Ohio	Active	
**Chattanooga**	1975	University of Tennessee at Chattanooga	Chattanooga, Tennessee	Active	
Georgia Medical	1975	Medical College of Georgia	Augusta, Georgia	Inactive	
**Hawaii Hilo**	1975	University of Hawaiʻi at Hilo	Hilo, Hawaii	Active	
**Lehman**	1975	Lehman College	New York City, New York	Active	
Oakland	1975–19xx ?	Oakland area	Oakland, California	Inactive	
**Omaha**	1975	Omaha area	Omaha, Nebraska	Active	
**Texas, El Paso**	1975	University of Texas at El Paso	El Paso, Texas	Active	
**Dayton**	1975	University of Dayton	Dayton, Ohio	Active	
**Oakland**	1975	Oakland University	Rochester, Michigan	Active	
**Ramapo**	1975	Ramapo College	Mahwah, New Jersey	Active	
**South Alabama**	1975	University of South Alabama	Mobile, Alabama	Active	
**Loma Linda**	1976	Loma Linda University	Loma Linda, California	Active	
**New Jersey Tech**	1976	New Jersey Institute of Technology	Newark, New Jersey	Active	
**Oklahoma Health Science Center**	1976	University of Oklahoma Health Sciences Center	Oklahoma City, Oklahoma	Active	
**Southern Methodist**	1976	Southern Methodist University	University Park, Texas	Active	
**Toledo**	1976	University of Toledo	Toledo, Ohio	Active	
**Abbott Laboratories**	1977	Abbott Laboratories	Green Oaks, Illinois	Active	
**Guelph**	1977	University of Guelph	Guelph, Ontario, Canada	Active	
**Murray State**	1978	Murray State University	Murray, Kentucky	Active	
**Western Connecticut State**	1979	Western Connecticut State University	Danbury, Connecticut	Active	
**Calgary**	1980	University of Calgary	Calgary, Alberta, Canada	Active	
**Quinnipiac**	1980	Quinnipiac area	Hamden, Connecticut	Active	(Note: Chapter was originally affiliated with Quinnipiac University but is now a community based chapter.)
**Ottawa**	1983	Ottawa area	Ottawa, Ontario, Canada	Active	
**Texas at Dallas**	1983	University of Texas at Dallas	Richardson, Texas	Active	
**University of Toronto**	1983	University of Toronto	Toronto, Ontario, Canada	Active	
**Philadelphia College**	1984	Philadelphia College of Osteopathic Medicine	Philadelphia, Pennsylvania	Active	
**Purdue Fort Wayne**	1984	Purdue University Fort Wayne	Fort Wayne, Indiana	Active	(Note: Chapter was established at Indiana University-Purdue University at Ft. Wayne which split into two institutions in June 2018.)
**Greenbrier Valley**	1985	Greenbrier Valley area	Lewisburg, West Virginia	Active	
**Northwestern Pennsylvania**	1985	Northwestern Pennsylvania	Erie, Pennsylvania	Active	
**Rhode Island College**	1985	Rhode Island College	Providence, Rhode Island	Active	
**Asheville**	1986	University of North Carolina at Asheville	Asheville, North Carolina	Active	
**Australian**	1986	Australia nationwide	Murdoch, Western Australia, Australia	Active	
**Nebraska at Kearney**	1986	University of Nebraska at Kearney	Kearney, Nebraska	Active	
**Wilmington**	1986	University of North Carolina Wilmington	Wilmington, North Carolina	Active	
**Villanova**	1989	Villanova University	Villanova, Pennsylvania	Active	
**Woods Hole**	1989	Woods Hole Oceanographic Institution	Woods Hole, Massachusetts	Active	
**Southern Maine**	1990	University of Southern Maine	Lewiston, Maine	Active	
**Charleston**	1991	Charleston area	Charleston, South Carolina	Active	
**Research Triangle Park**	1991	Research Triangle Park	Research Triangle Park, North Carolina	Active	
**Shenandoah Valley**	1991	Harrisonburg area	Harrisonburg, Virginia	Active	
**California Irvine**	1991	University of California, Irvine	Irvine, California	Active	
**South Florida Water Management District**	1992	South Florida Water Management District	West Palm Beach, Florida	Active	
**Swiss**	1992	Switzerland nationwide	Bern, Switzerland	Active	
**Southern Oregon**	1993	Southern Oregon	Ashland, Oregon	Active	
**University of Alberta**	1993	University of Alberta	Edmonton, Alberta, Canada	Active	
**SUNY Purchase**	1996	State University of New York at Purchase	Purchase, New York	Active	
**Eastern Illinois**	1997	Eastern Illinois University	Charleston, Illinois	Active	
**Barry University**	1998	Barry University	Miami Shores, Florida	Active	
**Grove City**	1998	Grove City College	Grove City, Pennsylvania	Active	
**South Texas**	1999	South Texas	Corpus Christi, Texas	Active	
**Fairfield University**	2000	Fairfield University	Fairfield, Connecticut	Active	
**Carthage**	2001	Carthage College	Kenosha, Wisconsin	Active	
**Washington College**	2001	Washington College	Chestertown, Maryland	Active	
**Tarleton State**	2003	Tarleton State University	Stephenville, Texas	Active	
**Mercer**	2005	Mercer University	Macon, Georgia	Active	
**Missouri–St. Louis**	2006	University of Missouri–St. Louis	St. Louis, Missouri	Active	
**California, Merced**	2007	University of California, Merced	Merced, California	Active	
**Florida International**	2007	Florida International University	University Park, Florida	Active	
**Providence College**	2008	Providence College	Providence, Rhode Island	Active	
**Mount Saint Vincent**	2009	University of Mount Saint Vincent	Riverdale, Bronx, New York	Active	
**Nordic**	2009	Norway, Sweden, Finland, and Iceland	Espoo, Finland	Active	
**North Shore**	2009	Salem, Wenham, and Beverly communities	Salem, Massachusetts	Active	
**Findlay**	2010	University of Findlay	Findlay, Ohio	Active	
**Purdue Calumet**	2012	Purdue University Northwest	Hammond, Indiana	Active	
**Radford**	2014	Radford University	Radford, Virginia	Active	
**West Chester**	April 12, 2016	West Chester University	West Chester, Pennsylvania	Active	
**South Florida**	2018	University of South Florida	Tampa, Florida	Active	
**Austin College**	March 7, 2019	Austin College	Sherman, Texas	Active	
**Nova Southeastern**	September 19, 2019	Nova Southeastern University	Fort Lauderdale, Florida	Active	
**Midwestern University**	May 18, 2021	Midwestern University	Glendale, Arizona	Active	
**Whitworth**	May 2021	Whitworth University	Spokane, Washington	Active	
**Elmezzi Graduate School**	March 30, 2023	Elmezzi Graduate School of Molecular Medicine	Manhasset, New York	Active	
**Air Force Dayton**		Wright-Patterson Air Force Base	Dayton, Ohio	Active	
**Albany**		Albany area	Albany, Oregon	Active	
**American University of Beirut**		American University of Beirut	Beirut, Lebanon	Active	
**Arkansas State**		Arkansas State University	State University, Arkansas	Active	
**Atlanta University Center**		Atlanta University Center	Atlanta, Georgia	Active	(Note: AUC Consortium is a collaboration between four historically black colleges and universities: Clark Atlanta University, Spelman College, Morehouse College, and Morehouse School of Medicine.)
**Bangkok**		Bangkok area	Bangkok, Thailand	Active	
Baylor College of Dentistry		Baylor College of Dentistry	Dallas, Texas	Inactive	
**Berry College**		Berry College	Mount Berry, Georgia	Active	
**Boeing North America**		Boeing	Seal Beach, California	Active	
**BP America**		BP America	New York	Active	
**Bridgeport**		University of Bridgeport	Bridgeport, Connecticut	Active	
**British Columbia**		University of British Columbia	Vancouver, British Columbia, Canada	Active	
**Bucknell**		Bucknell University	Lewisburg, Pennsylvania	Active	
**Butler-Indianapolis**		Butler University	Indianapolis, Indiana	Active	
C. W. Post		C. W. Post College	Brookville, New York	Inactive	
**Cal Poly**		California Polytechnic State University, San Luis Obispo	San Luis Obispo, California	Active	
**Cal Poly Pomona**		California State Polytechnic University, Pomona	Pomona, California	Active	
**California State Bakersfield**		California State University, Bakersfield	Bakersfield, California	Active	
**California State Chico**		California State University, Chico	Chico, California	Active	
**California State Dominguez Hills**		California State University, Dominguez Hills	Carson, California	Active	
**California Santa Cruz**		University of California, Santa Cruz	Santa Cruz, California	Active	
California State Fresno		California State University, Fresno	Fresno, California	Inactive	
California State Hayward		California State University, Hayward	Hayward, California	Inactive	
**California State Long Beach**		California State University, Long Beach	Long Beach, California	Active	
**California State Sacramento**		California State University, Sacramento	Sacramento, California	Active	
**California State San Bernardino**		California State University, San Bernardino	San Bernardino, California	Active	
**Calspan**		Calspan	Buffalo, New York	Active	
**Center for Naval Analyses**		Center for Naval Analyses	Alexandria, Virginia	Active	
**Central Michigan**		Central Michigan University	Mount Pleasant, Michigan	Active	
Central Missouri		University of Central Missouri	Warrensburg, Missouri	Inactive	
**Central Savannah River Area**		Central Savannah River Area	Aiken, South Carolina	Active	
Central Texas Research Society		Central Texas Research Society	Temple, Texas	Inactive	
**China Lake**		Naval Air Weapons Station China Lake	Ridgecrest, California	Active	
**CINVESTAV**		CINVESTAV	Mexico City, Mexico	Active	
**City College of New York**		City College of New York	New York City, New York	Active	
**Clear Lake**		Clear Lake	Houston, Texas	Active	
College of the Holy Cross		College of the Holy Cross	Worcester, Massachusetts	Inactive	
Colorado State University Pueblo		Colorado State University Pueblo	Pueblo, Colorado	Inactive	
**Corning**		Corning Incorporated	Corning, New York	Active	
**David W. Taylor**		Carderock Division of the Naval Surface Warfare Center	Bethesda, Maryland	Active	(Note: Chapter formed at the David W. Taylor Naval Ship Research and Development Center which became the Carderock Division of the Naval Surface Warfare Center in 1992.)
**Depauw-Wabash**		Depauw University and Wabash College	Crawfordsville, Indiana	Active	
**DOE/NRC**		United States Department of Energy and Nuclear Regulatory Commission	Rockville, Maryland	Active	
Dubuque		University of Dubuque	Dubuque, Iowa	Inactive	
**DuPont**		DuPont Experimental Station	Wilmington, Delaware	Active	
Duquesne		Duquesne University	Pittsburgh, Pennsylvania	Inactive	
**Eastern Michigan**		Eastern Michigan University	Ypsilanti, Michigan	Active	
Eastern Oregon University		Eastern Oregon University	La Grande, Oregon	Inactive	
Emporia State		Emporia State University	Emporia, Kansas	Inactive	
Ferris State		Ferris State University	Big Rapids, Michigan	Inactive	
**Florida A&M**		Florida A&M University	Tallahassee, Florida	Active	
**Florida Atlantic**		Florida Atlantic University	Boca Raton, Florida	Active	
Florida Institute of Technology		Florida Institute of Technology	Melbourne, Florida	Inactive	
**Ford Motor Company**		Ford Motor Company	Dearborn, Michigan	Active	
**Fort Hays**		Fort Hays State University	Hays, Kansas	Active	
**Four Corners**		Multi-campus collegiate	Durango, Colorado	Active	
**Georgia Southern**		Georgia Southern University	Statesboro, Georgia	Active	
**Grand Valley**		Grand Valley State University	Allendale, Michigan	Active	
**Greater Des Moines**		Greater Des Moines	Des Moines, Iowa	Active	
GTE Laboratories		GTE Laboratories	Waltham, Massachusetts	Inactive	(Note: GTE (General Telephone & Electronics Corporation) ceased operations in 1982.)
**Gulf Coast**		Gulf Coast	Stennis Space Center, Mississippi	Active	
**Hartford**		Hartford area	Hartford, Connecticut	Active	
**Hollins**		Hollins University	Roanoke, Virginia	Active	
**Hope College**		Hope College	Holland, Michigan	Active	
Hughes Laboratories		Hughes Research Laboratories	Malibu, California	Inactive	
Humboldt State University		Humboldt State University	Arcata, California	Inactive	
**Hungarian**		Hungary nationwide	Budapest, Hungary	Active	
Huntsville	19xx ?–19xx ?	University of Alabama in Huntsville	Huntsville, Alabama	Inactive	
**Iberian**		Iberian Peninsula	Spain	Active	
**Johnson & Johnson**		Johnson & Johnson	Spring House, Pennsylvania	Active	
**Kalamazoo**		Kalamazoo area	Kalamazoo, Michigan	Active	
Kennesaw State		Kennesaw State University	Kennesaw, Georgia	Inactive	
**Kirksville**		Kirksville area	Kirksville, Missouri	Active	
**Lafayette**		Lafayette College	Easton, Pennsylvania	Active	
Lake Forest		Lake Forest College	Lake Forest, Illinois	Inactive	
**LLNL**		Lawrence Livermore National Laboratory	Livermore, California	Active	
Lynchburg		University of Lynchburg	Lynchburg, Virginia	Inactive	
M. W. Kellogg		M.W. Kellogg	Houston, Texas	Inactive	
**Magic Valley**		Magic Valley area	Kimberly, Idaho	Active	
Mesa State College		Colorado Mesa University	Grand Junction, Colorado	Inactive	
McDaniel		McDaniel College	Westminster, Maryland	Inactive	
**McMaster**		McMaster University	Hamilton, Ontario, Canada	Active	
**Memphis**		University of Memphis	Memphis, Tennessee	Active	
**Minnesota Duluth**		University of Minnesota Duluth	Duluth, Minnesota	Active	
**Minot State**		Minot State University	Minot, North Dakota	Active	
**Missouri State**		Missouri State University	Springfield, Missouri	Active	
**Monterrey Institute**		Monterrey Institute of Technology and Higher Education	Monterrey, Nuevo Leon, Mexico	Active	
Mount Sinai		Mount Sinai School of Medicine	New York City, New York	Inactive	
**Muskingum**		Muskingum University	New Concord, Ohio	Active	
**Nalco Chemical**		Nalco Chemical Company	Naperville, Illinois	Active	
**Naval Air Warfare Center Training Systems**		Naval Air Warfare Center Training Systems Division	Orlando, Florida	Active	
**New Mexico Tech**		New Mexico Institute of Mining and Technology	Socorro, New Mexico	Active	
**New Zealand**		New Zealand countrywide	Wellington, New Zealand	Active	
**North Carolina Central**		North Carolina Central University	Durham, North Carolina	Active	
North Texas		University of North Texas	Denton, Texas	Inactive	
Northeastern State		Northeastern State University	Tahlequah, Oklahoma	Inactive	(Note: Chapter formed at Northeastern Oklahoma State University, now called Northeastern State University.)
Northern Colorado		University of Northern Colorado	Greeley, Colorado	Inactive	
**Northern Iowa**		University of Northern Iowa	Cedar Falls, Iowa	Active	
Northern Kentucky		Northern Kentucky University	Highland Heights, Kentucky	Inactive	
**Northern Westchester**		Northern Westchester area	Westchester County, New York	Active	
**Northwest Indiana**		Northwest Indiana	Gary, Indiana	Active	
Northwestern State		Northwestern State University	Natchitoches, Louisiana	Inactive	
**Olin**		Olin Corporation	Cheshire, Connecticut	Active	
**Oneonta**		Oneonta area	Oneonta, New York	Active	
**Panama City**		Panama City area	Panama City, Florida	Active	
**Peoria**		Peoria area	Peoria, Illinois	Active	
**Picatinny**		Picatinny Arsenal	Mendham Borough, New Jersey	Active	
**Prague Institute of Advanced Studies**		Prague Institute of Advanced Studies	Prague, Czech Republic	Active	
**Prairie View**		Prairie View A&M University	Prairie View, Texas	Active	
Regis College		Regis College	Weston, Massachusetts	Inactive	
Richmond		University of Richmond	Richmond, Virginia	Inactive	
Roanoke College		Roanoke College	Salem, Virginia	Inactive	
**Roche Research**		Roche Research	Nutley, New Jersey	Active	
Rosalind Franklin		Rosalind Franklin University of Medicine and Science	North Chicago, Illinois	Inactive	
Saint Bonaventure		St. Bonaventure University	St. Bonaventure, New York	Inactive	
**St. Cloud State**		St. Cloud State University	St. Cloud, Minnesota	Active	
**Saint Mary's College of California**		Saint Mary's College of California	Moraga, California	Active	
**Sam Houston State**		Sam Houston State University	Huntsville, Texas	Active	
**San Joaquin Valley**		San Joaquin Valley	Stockton, California	Active	
**San Jose State**		San Jose State University	San Jose, California	Active	
Sangamon State		Sangamon State University	Springfield, Illinois	Inactive	
**Savannah**		Savannah area	Savannah, Georgia	Active	
**Seton Hall**		Seton Hall University	South Orange, New Jersey	Active	
**Shreveport**		Shreveport area	Shreveport, Louisiana	Active	
**Sigma Xi Georgia**		Georgia nationwide	Tbilisi, Georgia	Active	
**Sigma Xi Moscow**		Moscow area	Moscow, Russia	Active	
**Sigma Xi Romania**		Romania nationwide	Bucharest, Romania	Active	
**Slippery Rock**		Slippery Rock University	Slippery Rock, Pennsylvania	Active	
**Southcentral Pennsylvania**		South Central Pennsylvania	Waynesboro, Pennsylvania	Active	
Southeast Missouri State		Southeast Missouri State University	Cape Girardeau, Missouri	Inactive	
**Southern Appalachian**		Southern Appalachian area	Johnson City, Tennessee	Active	
**Southern Indiana**		Southern Indiana	Evansville, Indiana	Active	
Southern University		Southern University	Baton Rouge, Louisiana	Inactive	
State University College at Buffalo		State University College at Buffalo	Buffalo, New York	Inactive	
State University College at New Paltz		State University College at New Paltz	New Paltz, New York	Inactive	
Stephen F. Austin		Stephen F. Austin State University	Nacogdoches, Texas	Inactive	
SUNY Brockport		State University College at Brockport	Brockport, New York	Inactive	
**SUNY Cortland**		State University of New York at Cortland	Cortland, New York	Active	
**Tampa Bay**		Tampa Bay area	Tampa, Florida	Active	
**Tennessee A&I Fisk-Meharry**		Tennessee State University, Fisk University, and Meharry Medical College	Nashville, Tennessee	Active	
Texas A&M– Commerce		Texas A&M University–Commerce	Commerce, Texas	Inactive	
Texas Rio Grande Valley		University of Texas Rio Grande Valley	Brownsville, Texas	Inactive	
**Towson**		Towson University	Baltimore, Maryland	Active	
Tri-State		Tri-State University	Angola, Indiana	Inactive	
UL Lafayette		University of Louisiana at Lafayette	Lafayette, Louisiana	Inactive	
UL Monroe		University of Louisiana at Monroe	Monroe, Louisiana	Inactive	
**UNAM**		National Autonomous University of Mexico	Mexico City, Mexico	Active	
University of Connecticut Health Center		UConn Health	Farmington, Connecticut	Inactive	
University of Illinois		University of Illinois Urbana-Champaign	Champaign, Illinois	Inactive	
University of Illinois Chicago		University of Illinois Chicago	Chicago, Illinois	Inactive	
University of the South		University of the South	Sewanee, Tennessee	Inactive	
**UNLV**		University of Nevada, Las Vegas	Las Vegas, Nevada	Active	
USciences		University of the Sciences	Philadelphia, Pennsylvania	Inactive	(Note: University of the Sciences merged into Saint Joseph's University on June 1, 2022.)
**UT Health Science Center**		University of Tennessee Health Science Center	Memphis, Tennessee	Active	(Note: The chapter was formed at the University of Tennessee Memphis, now called the University of Tennessee Health Science Center.)
**Ventura County**		Ventura County	Ventura, California	Active	
Virginia State		Virginia State University	Petersburg, Virginia	Inactive	
**Wabash Valley**		Wabash Valley area	Terre Haute, Indiana	Active	
**Waterways Experiment Station**		Waterways Experiment Station	Vicksburg, Mississippi	Active	
**Westchester**		Westchester County	New York	Active	
Western Illinois		Western Illinois University	Macomb, Illinois	Inactive	
**Western Pennsylvania**		Western Pennsylvania	Pennsylvania	Active	
**Western Washington**		Western Washington University	Bellingham, Washington	Active	
Wilkes		Wilkes University	Wilkes-Barre, Pennsylvania	Inactive	
William Paterson		William Paterson University	Wayne, New Jersey	Inactive	
Wisconsin-Eau Claire/Stout		University of Wisconsin–Eau Claire and University of Wisconsin–Stout	Eau Claire, Wisconsin	Inactive	
**Wisconsin-Green Bay**		University of Wisconsin–Green Bay	Green Bay, Wisconsin	Active	
Wisconsin-Stevens Point		University of Wisconsin–Stevens Point	Stevens Point, Wisconsin	Inactive	
Wittenberg		Wittenberg University	Springfield, Ohio	Inactive	
WSU Vancouver		Washington State University Vancouver	Vancouver, Washington	Inactive	
**Wooster**		Wooster area	Wooster, Ohio	Active	
