= Lisa Seitz-Gruwell =

American charity fundraising executive

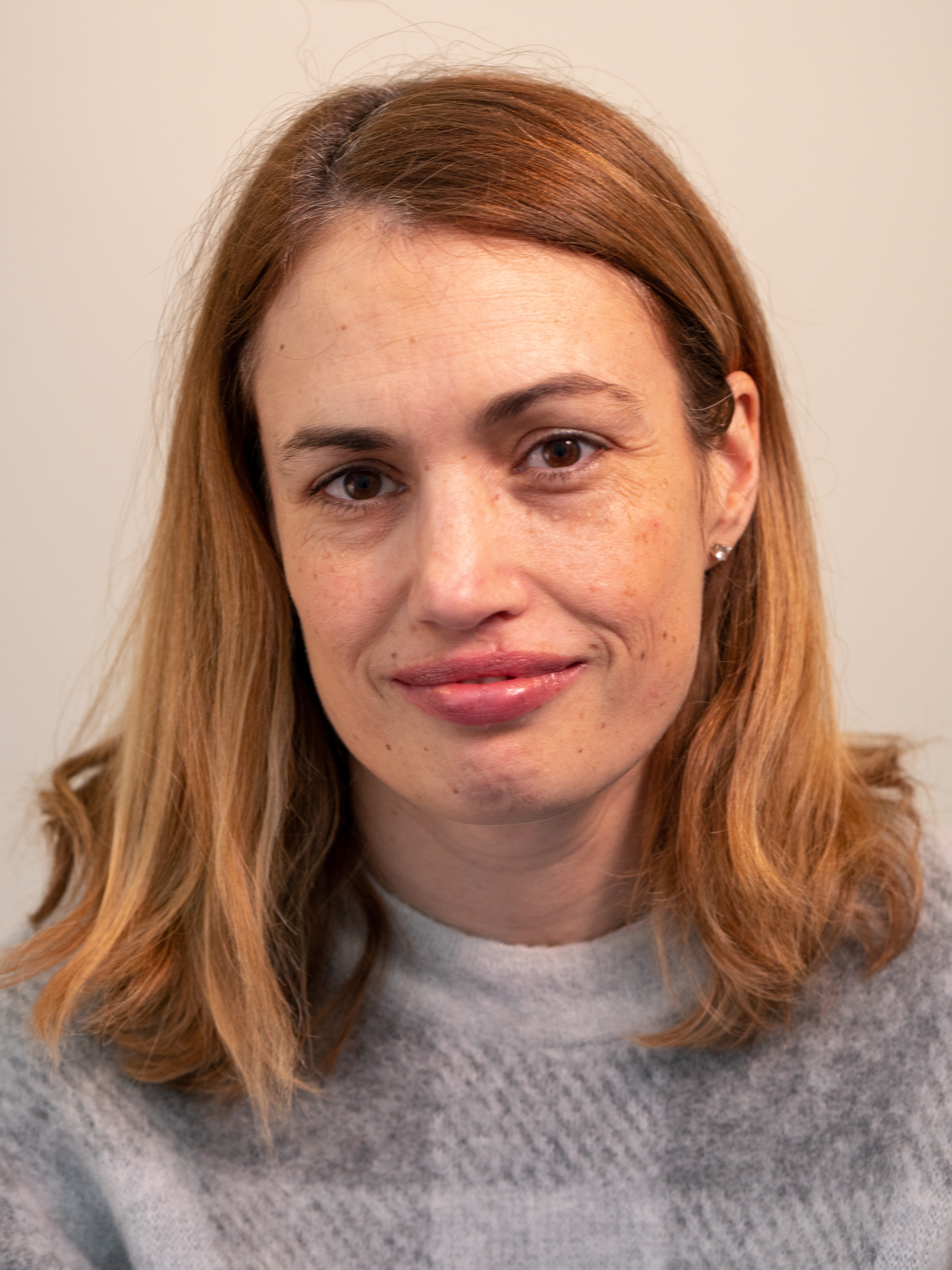
- Seitz-Gruwell at Wikimedia Summit 2019
- Born: Lisa Seitz; Great Falls, Montana
- Education: Carroll College
- Occupations: Chief Advancement Officer, Buck Institute for Research on Aging
- Spouse: Stephen "Chris" Gruwell

Lisa Seitz-Gruwell is an American charity fundraising executive, who currently serves as Chief Advancement Officer for the Buck Institute for Research on Aging.

Earlier in her career, Seitz-Gruwell worked as a political media consultant, while also holding various roles in public relations and public policy. She then served as Chief Operating Officer for Skyline Public Works and the Rappaport Family Foundation, as Director of Communications and Public Affairs with the San Francisco Recreation & Parks Department and as a San Francisco civil service commissioner.

From 2011 to 2026, she served as President of the Wikimedia Endowment, and Chief Advancement Officer and Deputy Chief Executive Officer of the Wikimedia Foundation.

== Early life and education ==
Lisa Seitz was born and raised in Great Falls, Montana. She earned a bachelor's degree in public relations and political science from Carroll College in Helena, Montana. She also studied as a Coro Fellow and at the Stanford Graduate School of Business Center for Social Innovation's Executive Program for Philanthropy Leaders.

== Career ==
Following her graduation from Carroll College she worked in Montana legislative politics in the late 1990s before moving to California.

After her move to the San Francisco Bay Area she worked as a public relations executive for IPG's Weber Group (now part of Weber Shandwick), and in 2001 she served as California Assembly Majority Leader Kevin Shelley's District Director and Press Secretary.

In 2002–2003, Seitz-Gruwell was a political media consultant for San Francisco-based Storefront Political Media, a communications firm known for its multi-channel advertising campaigns. She developed campaign strategy, wrote media plans and messages for candidates for public office at all levels of government including Gavin Newsom for mayor of San Francisco; wrote and produced political television, radio, Internet and print advertising; created fundraising plans and developed and managed multi-million dollar campaign budgets; and secured media coverage and briefed candidates prior to interviews and editorial board meetings.

From 2003 to 2007 Seitz-Gruwell served as the Chief Operating Officer for Skyline Public Works (SPW), an investment advisory firm led by Andrew S. Rappaport and his wife Deborah which blended venture capital with political philanthropy and provided administrative and grant making support to the Rappaport Family Foundation, a private foundation founded by the Rappaports in 2002. At Skyline Public Works, Gruwell directed political and philanthropic giving for Andy Rappaport, totaling $5 to $7 million a year. She managed all communications and media relations for the foundation; helped set the strategic direction for the political fund and the Rappaport Family Foundation; and managed the staff, operations and programs of both entities. Skyline Public Works functioned as a venture-capital-style business incubator, in which groups that the political donors funded got office space, business advice, and capital. The Rappaports placed bets on untested organizations in the hope that eventually one of them would become the new thing that nudged America leftward.

From 2008 to 2011 Seitz-Gruwell worked as a consultant with Gruwell and Associates, a management consultant group whose clients included Democracy Alliance, Rappaport Family Foundation and Skyline Public Works, Current TV, and the Wikimedia Foundation.

Seitz-Gruwell was Director of Communications and Public Affairs with the San Francisco Recreation & Parks Department from November 2008 to January 2010. She was appointed by mayor Gavin Newsom to San Francisco's civil service commission on August 3, 2010, a seat she held until August 30, 2011.

Seitz-Gruwell joined the Wikimedia Foundation in September 2011 as the Development Director in the Community Department led by Zack Exley, tasked with developing sustainable support for the Foundation by driving high-dollar fundraising efforts. In July 2013, after Exley transitioned from Chief Revenue Officer to part-time consultant, she was promoted by then-CEO Sue Gardner to the position of Chief Revenue Officer. In March 2015, she was named Chief Advancement Officer, leading the newly created Advancement Department. In September 2022, Wikimedia CEO Maryana Iskander added the role of Deputy to the CEO to her responsibilities. In July 2026, she announced that she would step down from all of her roles at both the WMF and Wikimedia Endowment; the news were later confirmed by the Endowment Board Meeting held later the same month.

In August 2026, Seitz-Gruwell was officially appointed as Chief Advancement Officer for the Buck Institute for Research on Aging.

== Views ==
Seitz-Gruwell supported the progressive movement while working at SPW and directed it to fund organizations related to the cause. In a 2006 interview, she expressed concern that conservatives had built infrastructure like think tanks and other organizations while Democrats had not.

When the Wikimedia Endowment was announced at Wikipedia's 15th birthday party in January 2015, Seitz-Gruwell said "We have a great fundraising model right now, but things on the Internet change so it's not something we can count on forever. Wikipedia is a pretty rare thing, and the endowment is there to ensure this cultural treasure will never go away."

In 2018 Seitz-Gruwell told TechCrunch that while Wikipedia's content is free to use by all, some companies were exploiting the organization by not reciprocating. In October 2021, the Wikimedia Foundation launched Wikimedia Enterprise, a new commercial product for large-scale reusers and distributors of Wikimedia content. Gruwell said "As people and companies increasingly seek to leverage its value, we created Wikimedia Enterprise to address the growing number of ways people encounter Wikipedia content outside of our sites and further support our free knowledge mission. The product meets the growing needs of commercial content reusers, making it easier for people to discover, find, and share content from our sites, while also providing commercial companies an avenue to support and invest in the future of Wikimedia's knowledge ecosystem."

== Personal life ==
Seitz-Gruwell is married to Chris Gruwell, a longtime San Francisco lobbyist and political fundraiser who in April 2022 was appointed by California governor Gavin Newsom to the California State Athletic Commission. They live in San Francisco.

== See also ==
- List of Wikipedia people
