= Eric Verdin =

Belgian business executive

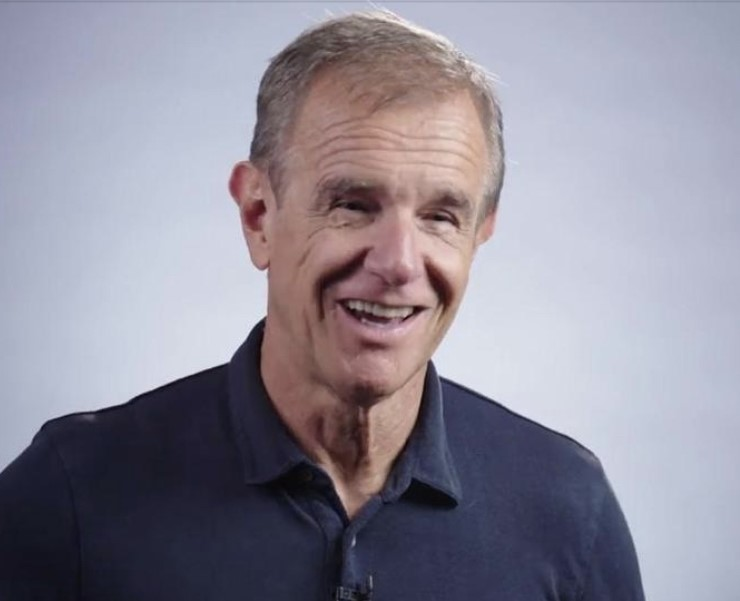
- Born: April 27, 1957 (age 69); Liege, Belgium
- Education: University of Liege; Harvard University
- Scientific career
- Fields: Geroscientist
- Workplaces: The Buck Institute for Research on Aging

Eric M. Verdin is a Belgian geroscientist, researcher, and professor who has served as president and chief executive officer of the Buck Institute for Research on Aging since 2016. Verdin’s research focuses on metabolism, diet, and the different proteins and molecules that affect the aging process and its associated diseases. He has published more than 210 papers and has more than 15 patents.

== Life and career ==
Eric M. Verdin was born in Belgium. He has a BS in Medical Sciences and doctorate of medicine from the University of Liege.

After graduating from university, Verdin trained at Harvard Medical School. In 1997, he joined the Gladstone Institute for Virology and Immunology, where he worked for twenty years. He ended his time there as associate director and senior investigator in the virology and immunology unit.

He is also a professor of medicine at the University of California, San Francisco. He previously held faculty positions at the National Institutes of Health and at Picower Institute for Medical Research. He is on the scientific advisory board of Amazentis and previously served on the National Scientific Advisory Council of the American Federation for Aging Research. He was a consultant to Calico, an aging-research company founded by Google. He is an inventor on at least 15 published patents.

Verdin recreationally races race cars and trains for mental and physical endurance in LMP, Formula Atlantic and Formula 1 cars.

=== The Buck Institute for Research on Aging ===
In November 2016, Verdin became president and CEO of the Buck Institute for Research on Aging. The Buck Institute is the first independent research center focused solely on aging. As of 2022, it had an operating budget of $65 million a year and around 300 employees. The Buck's first human clinical trial, Buck Institute Ketone Ester (BIKE), was announced in 2023.

In 2025, Verdin was named a scientific ambassador for Alliance for Longevity Science, Arts & Entertainment (ALSAE), a partner organization of the Buck Institute.

=== Research focus areas ===
Verdin’s research has seen him focus on:

- Epigenetic regulation: His research career began with a focus on epigenetic regulation, and for many years he worked primarily on the biology of HIV, with a particular emphasis on transcriptional regulation and the role of chromatin
- Sirtuins: a family of proteins that influence the aging process by inhibiting histone deacetylases (HDACs) through epigenetics
- Ketone bodies: created from fatty acids by the liver and used as an energy source during periods when carbs are not available
- BHB: beta-hydroxybutyrate, the ketone body present in the highest amounts in the human body when in ketosis; butyrate is an HDAC-inhibiting molecule that could help extend lifespans
- NAD: nicotinamide adenine dinucleotide (NAD), a molecule that is critical for helping mitochondria produce energy; as people age, their cells start to lose NAD
- NAD+: the oxidized form of NAD

At Gladstone, Verdin researched the role of metabolism and diet in aging and on chronic diseases of aging, including Alzheimer’s. His research was particularly focused on the role of caloric restriction in increased health and lifespan.

His research focus at the Buck is on nutrition and how diet affects “the levels of key metabolites in the body, and how these in turn influence the immune response - especially the chronic inflammation associated with aging.” A few startups have been founded based on his work, including Napa Therapeutics, BHB Therapeutics, and Selah Therapeutics.

== Selected publications ==
Verdin has an h-index of 103 and has published more than 210 scientific papers including:

- Verdin, Eric (2015-12-04). "NAD+ in aging, metabolism, and neurodegeneration". Science. 350 (6265): 1208–1213. Bibcode:2015Sci...350.1208V. doi:10.1126/science.aac4854. ISSN 0036-8075. PMID 26785480. S2CID 27313960.
- Verdin, Eric; Ott, Melanie (2015). "50 years of protein acetylation: from gene regulation to epigenetics, metabolism and beyond". Nature Reviews Molecular Cell Biology. 16 (4): 258–264. doi:10.1038/nrm3931. ISSN 1471-0080. PMID 25549891. S2CID 10192177.
- Gut, Philipp; Verdin, Eric (2013-10-24). "The nexus of chromatin regulation and intermediary metabolism". Nature. 502 (7472): 489–498. Bibcode:2013Natur.502..489G. doi:10.1038/nature12752. ISSN 1476-4687. PMID 24153302. S2CID 4471359.
- Shimazu, Tadahiro; Hirschey, Matthew D.; Newman, John; He, Wenjuan; Shirakawa, Kotaro; Le Moan, Natacha; Grueter, Carrie A.; Lim, Hyungwook; Saunders, Laura R. (2013-01-11). "Suppression of Oxidative Stress by β-Hydroxybutyrate, an Endogenous Histone Deacetylase Inhibitor". Science. 339 (6116): 211–214. Bibcode:2013Sci...339..211S. doi:10.1126/science.1227166. ISSN 0036-8075. PMC 3735349. PMID 23223453.
- Hirschey, Matthew D.; Shimazu, Tadahiro; Jing, Enxuan; Grueter, Carrie A.; Collins, Amy M.; Aouizerat, Bradley; Stančáková, Alena; Goetzman, Eric; Lam, Maggie M. (2011-10-21). "SIRT3 deficiency and mitochondrial protein hyperacetylation accelerate the development of the metabolic syndrome". Molecular Cell. 44 (2): 177–190. doi:10.1016/j.molcel.2011.07.019. ISSN 1097-4164. PMC 3563434. PMID 21856199.
- Hirschey, Matthew D.; Shimazu, Tadahiro; Goetzman, Eric; Jing, Enxuan; Schwer, Bjoern; Lombard, David B.; Grueter, Carrie A.; Harris, Charles; Biddinger, Sudha (2010-03-04). "SIRT3 regulates mitochondrial fatty-acid oxidation by reversible enzyme deacetylation". Nature. 464 (7285): 121–125. Bibcode:2010Natur.464..121H. doi:10.1038/nature08778. ISSN 1476-4687. PMC 2841477. PMID 20203611.
