= David G. Nicholls =

David Nicholls FRS
- Born: David G. Nicholls
- Education: University of Cambridge (MA); University of Bristol (PhD)
- Scientific career
- Fields: Brown fat Mitochondria; Bioenergetics; Neurodegeneration
- Workplaces: University of Dundee; Buck Institute for Research on Aging; Lund University

David G. Nicholls is Professor Emeritus of Mitochondrial Physiology at the Buck Institute for Research on Aging in Novato, California. His research focuses on chemiosmosis proposed by Peter D. Mitchell to couple the electron transport chain to ATP synthase. His explanation of chemiosmotic theory in the textbook Bioenergetics has become the standard text in the field. He was elected a Fellow of the Royal Society (FRS) in 2019 for "substantial contribution to the improvement of natural knowledge".
