= Buck Institute for Research on Aging =

US biomedical research institute

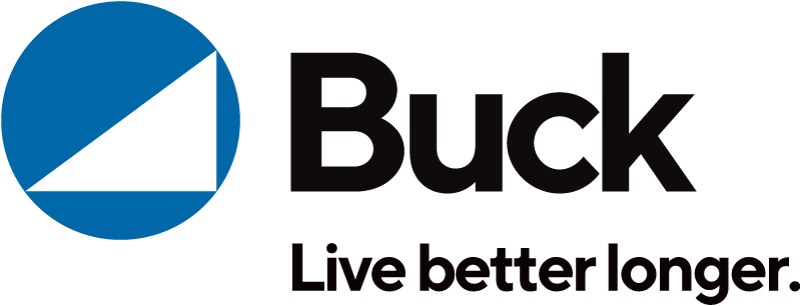
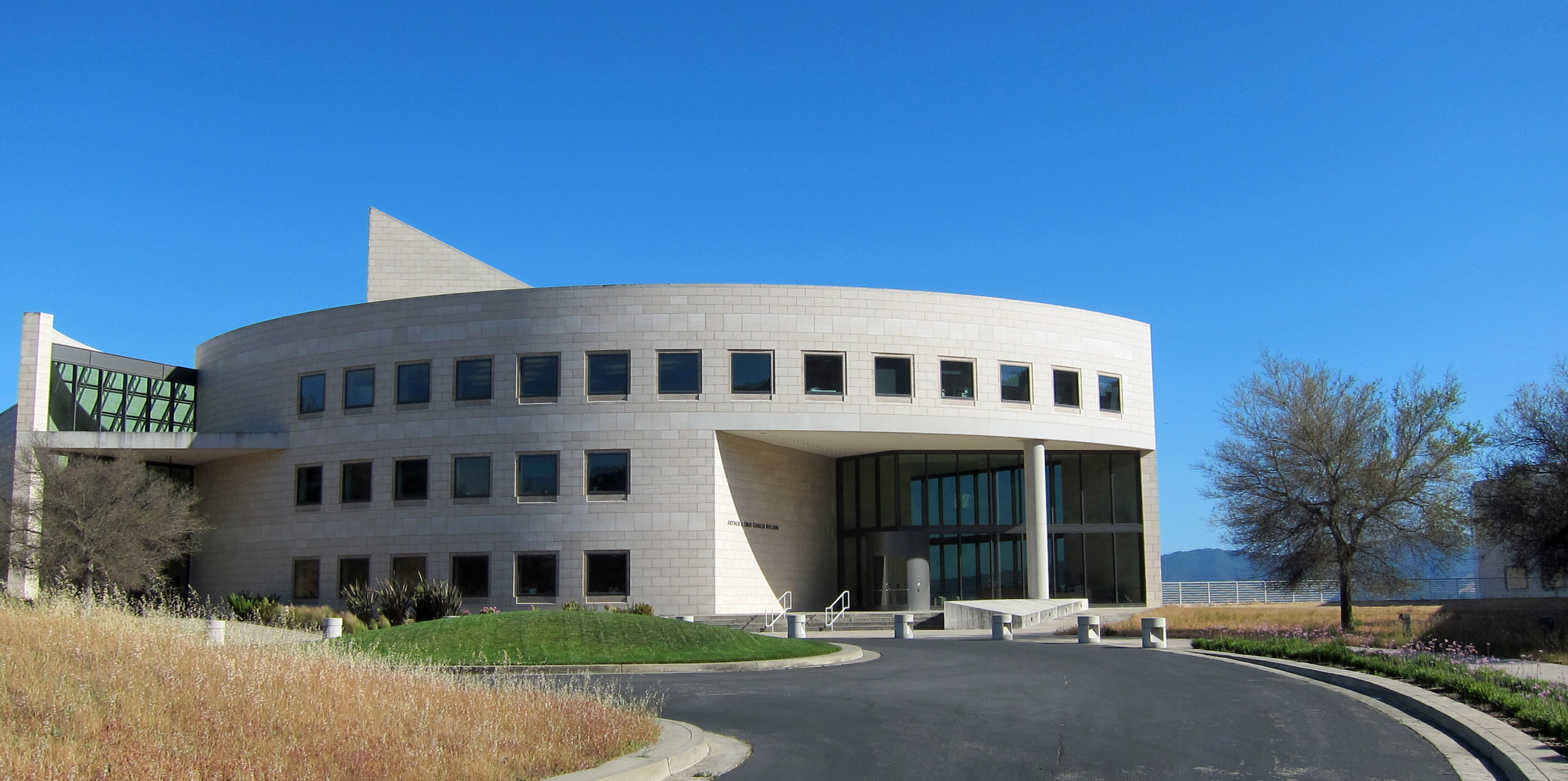
- Buck Institute logo and main campus
- Founder: Beryl Hamilton Buck
- Established: 30 Sep 1999
- Focus: Aging medical research
- President: Eric M. Verdin
- Budget: $37 million
- Formerly called: Buck Institute for Age Research
- Address: 8001 Redwood Blvd. Novato, CA 94945-1400
- Location: Novato, California, United States
- Coordinates: 38.133939°N 122.570432°W
- Interactive map of Buck Institute for Research on Aging
- Website: buckinstitute.org

The Buck Institute for Research on Aging is an independent nonprofit biomedical research institute located in Novato, California. It is dedicated to researching aging and age-related disease and is one of nine centers for aging research of the Glenn Foundation for Medical Research.

The Buck Institute was founded in 1999 as the world's first institute devoted to the study of intervention in the aging process. It is named for Marin County philanthropists Leonard and Beryl Hamilton Buck, whose estate funded the endowment that helped establish the institute, and the Buck Trust currently contributes approximately $6 million annually to support the institute's work. The campus of the Buck Institute was designed by architect I. M. Pei.

In May 2007, the institute established a cooperative agreement with the University of California's Davis and Merced campuses to coordinate stem cell research.

== History ==
The Buck Foundation Trust was created by Beryl Hamilton Buck after the death in 1953 of her husband, pathologist Leonard W. Buck. Leonard's father, Frank Buck, was one of the founders of Belridge Oil. When Beryl Buck died in 1975, the bulk of the estate became part of the San Francisco Foundation, about $7.6 million dedicated to "charitable purposes in Marin County" including, "extending help to the problems of aging." The Belridge Oil stock in the trust was bought in 1979 by Shell Oil for $253 million, increasing the trust's value substantially.

Attempts by the San Francisco Foundation to use the cy pres doctrine to spend outside of Marin County resulted in litigation which the SF Foundation lost. As part of a 1986 court settlement, the Marin Community Foundation was established to administer the trust, valued in 2013 at approximately $1 billion. The settlement required that 80% of the trust's annual earnings be distributed to causes specific to Marin County. The remaining 20% is to be distributed among three Marin County organizations:

- The Buck Institute for Research on Aging
- The Buck Institute for Education
- Alcohol Justice, formerly named The Marin Institute, which deals with alcohol-related problems.

In 2016, the institute began talks with the Gladstone Institutes, a San Francisco-based foundation, regarding a possible research alliance or merger. That discussion ended in October 2016.

In December 2022, the institute hosted The Longevity Summit, a two-day conference on ageing, the emerging new biotech companies in the field, and their innovations.

== Facilities ==
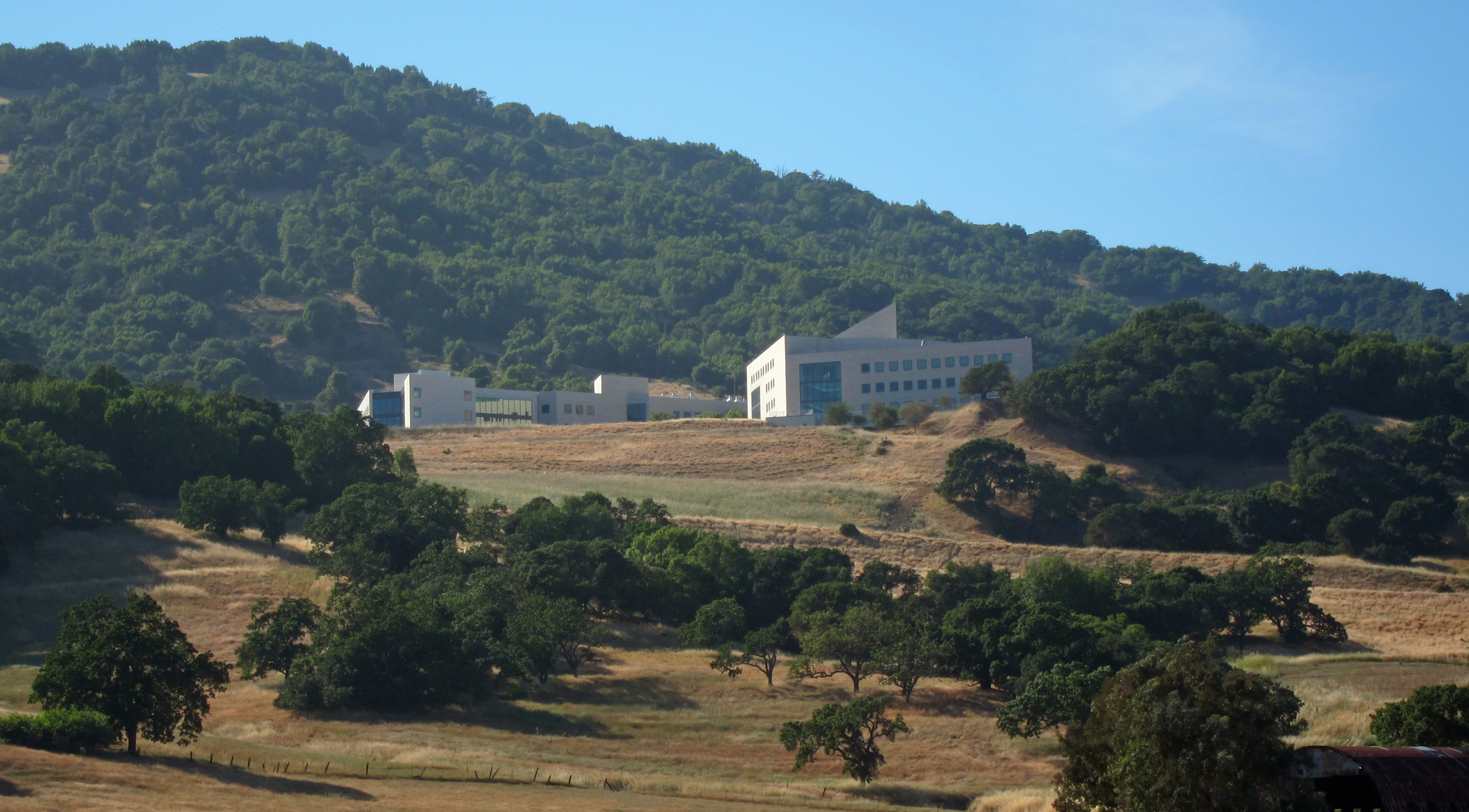
The campus of the Buck Institute, as seen from Highway 101

The institute is on a 488-acre (1.97 km^{2}; 0.76 sq mi) site located in the foothills of Mount Burdell, north of Novato, California. Of this, a 238-acre (0.96 km^{2}; 0.37 sq mi) portion is dedicated to permanent agricultural use; another 70-acre (0.28 km^{2}; 0.11 sq mi) portion is open public space.

I. M. Pei, who responded in 1989 to a request to submit a proposal to design the research facility, was selected as the architect for the institute's facility. Pei's master plan called for 355,000 square feet (33,000 m^{2}) of laboratory and facility space. The multi-stage plan calls for five interlocking buildings (four laboratory buildings and a support building) around a one-acre hexagonal courtyard, designed to provide a green oasis for quiet contemplation and outdoor activities. Pei used varied geometric elements and floating staircases, which appear throughout both the administrative and research buildings. The second of four research buildings approved in the master plan was completed in 2012.

As of 2016, the institute had more than $80 million in bond debt from building its Novato headquarters in 1999 and completing its third building in 2012. It was leasing 27,000 sq ft of its campus to for-profit businesses, including BioMarin, Ultragenyx, Cellular Dynamics, An2H Discovery Limited, and Excel Venture Management.

== Research ==
The Buck Institute's research program has ten focus areas related to geriatrics and longevity. The institute had about 250 staff members as of 2017.

Buck Institute conducts its research programs through twenty laboratories that focus on specific subjects. After a 12-year dispute with local animal activists, the institute agreed to limit research to animals no higher than rats and mice; many laboratories use no animals at all.

As of 2013, about half of the institute's support came from peer-reviewed grants from the National Institutes of Health and other federal agencies. Foundations and private donors contributed another 35% of the funding. An endowment from the Buck Trust Fund provided approximately 15% of the annual budget.

Grant revenue in 2015 was $17.4 million, compared to more than $28 million in 2011.

In 2015, California researchers opened the world's largest publicly available stem cell bank, with samples stored at the Buck Institute. The initial bank had 300 stem cell lines, with an ultimate goal of 9,000 lines.

In 2016, the institute launched a startup, called Unity Biotechnology First Company, aimed at developing medicines to treat age-related diseases and boost healthy lifespans.

One drug developed at the institute, rapamycin, is being researched by Mount Tam Biotechnologies, a private company, with the institute owning significant legal rights to the drug.

== Leadership ==
The founding president and CEO, Dale Bredesen, now heads the lab focused on Alzheimer's disease research. In July 2010 he was succeeded by Brian K. Kennedy, who resigned in October 2016. The institute's current president and CEO, Eric M. Verdin, was appointed in November 2016.

== Notable faculty ==
- Judith Campisi
- Lisa Seitz Gruwell
- Heinrich Jasper
- Brian K. Kennedy
- David G. Nicholls FRS
- Eric Verdin
- Peter Walter
- Alex Zhavoronkov

== Gallery ==
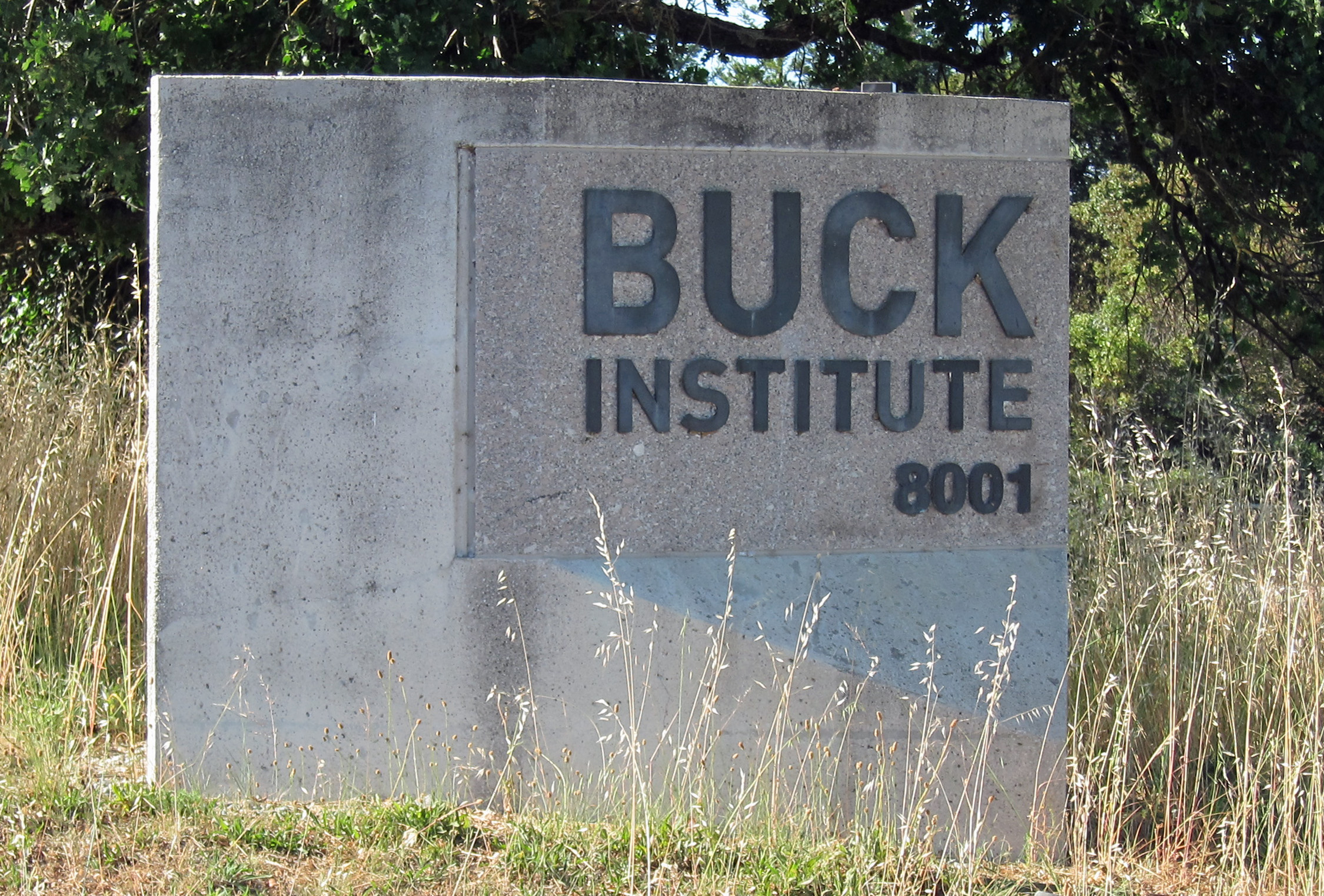
Entry sign for the Buck Institute, on Redwood Blvd.

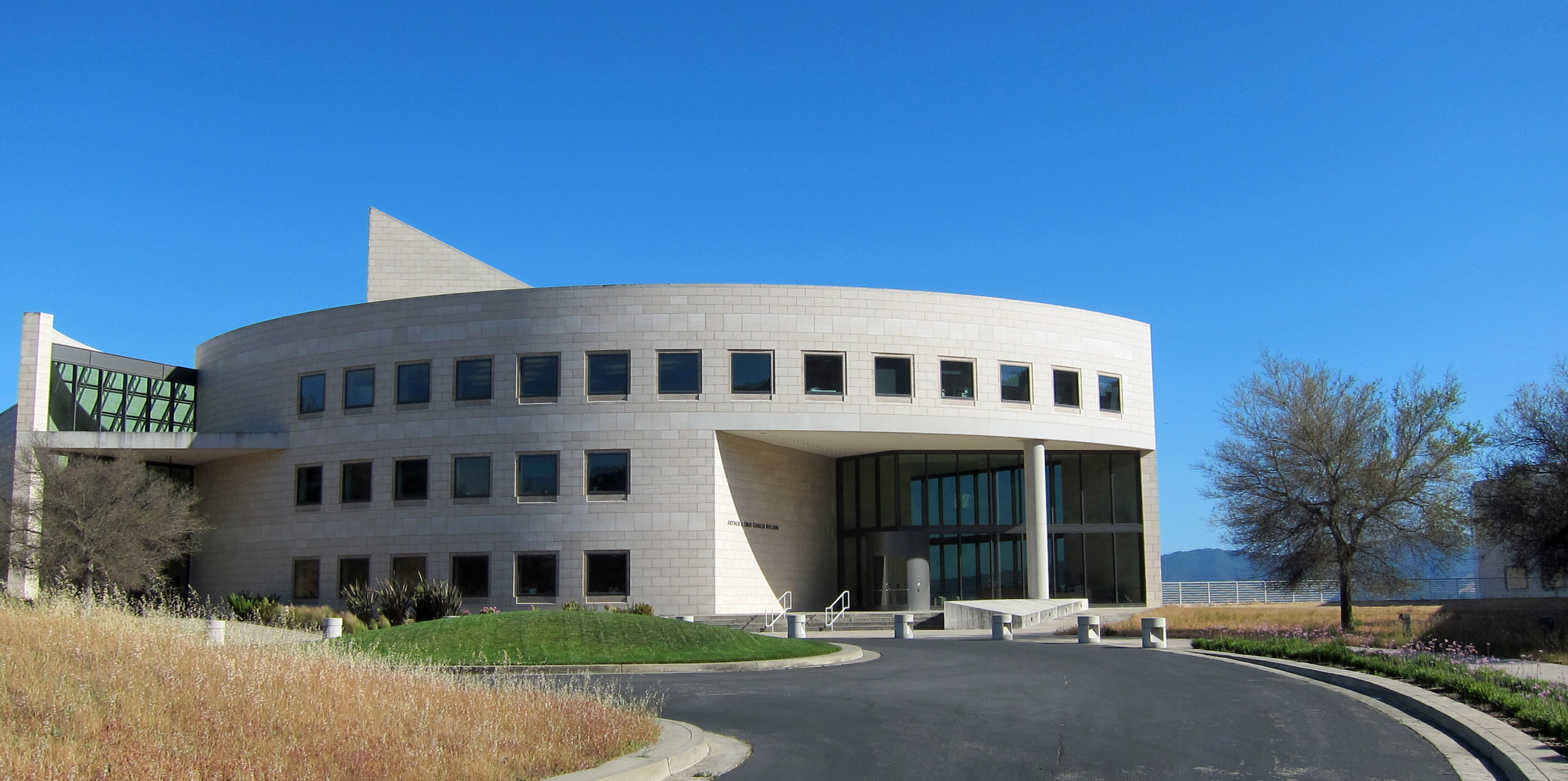
The main entrance of the Buck Institute

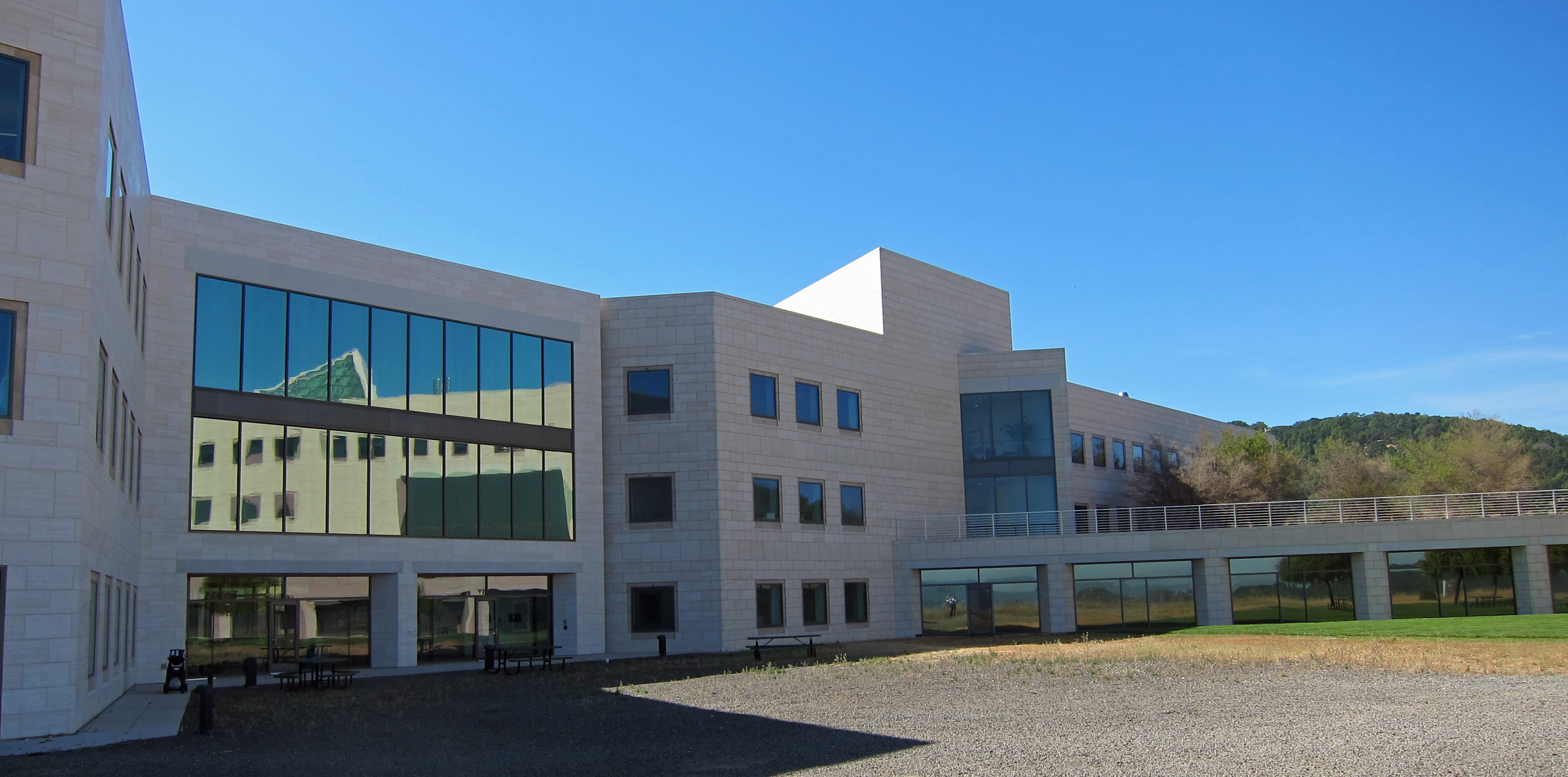
The second building of the Buck Institute

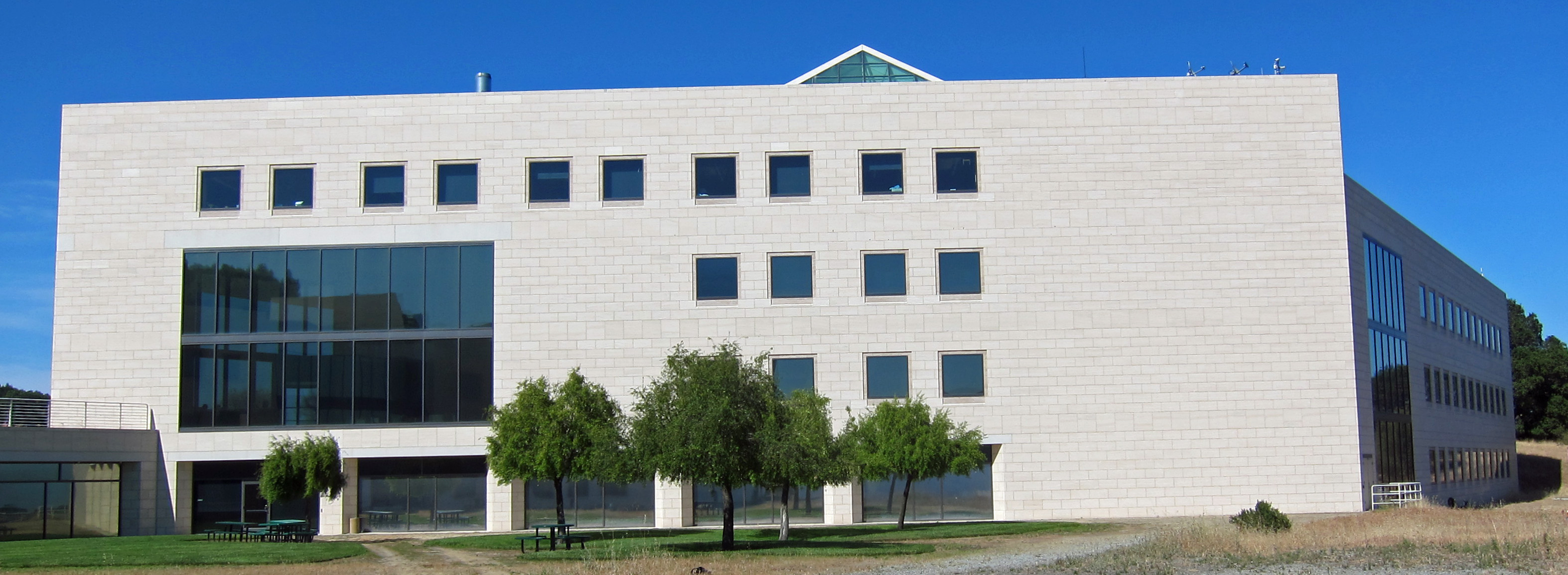
The Administration Building of the Buck Institute, as seen from the courtyard

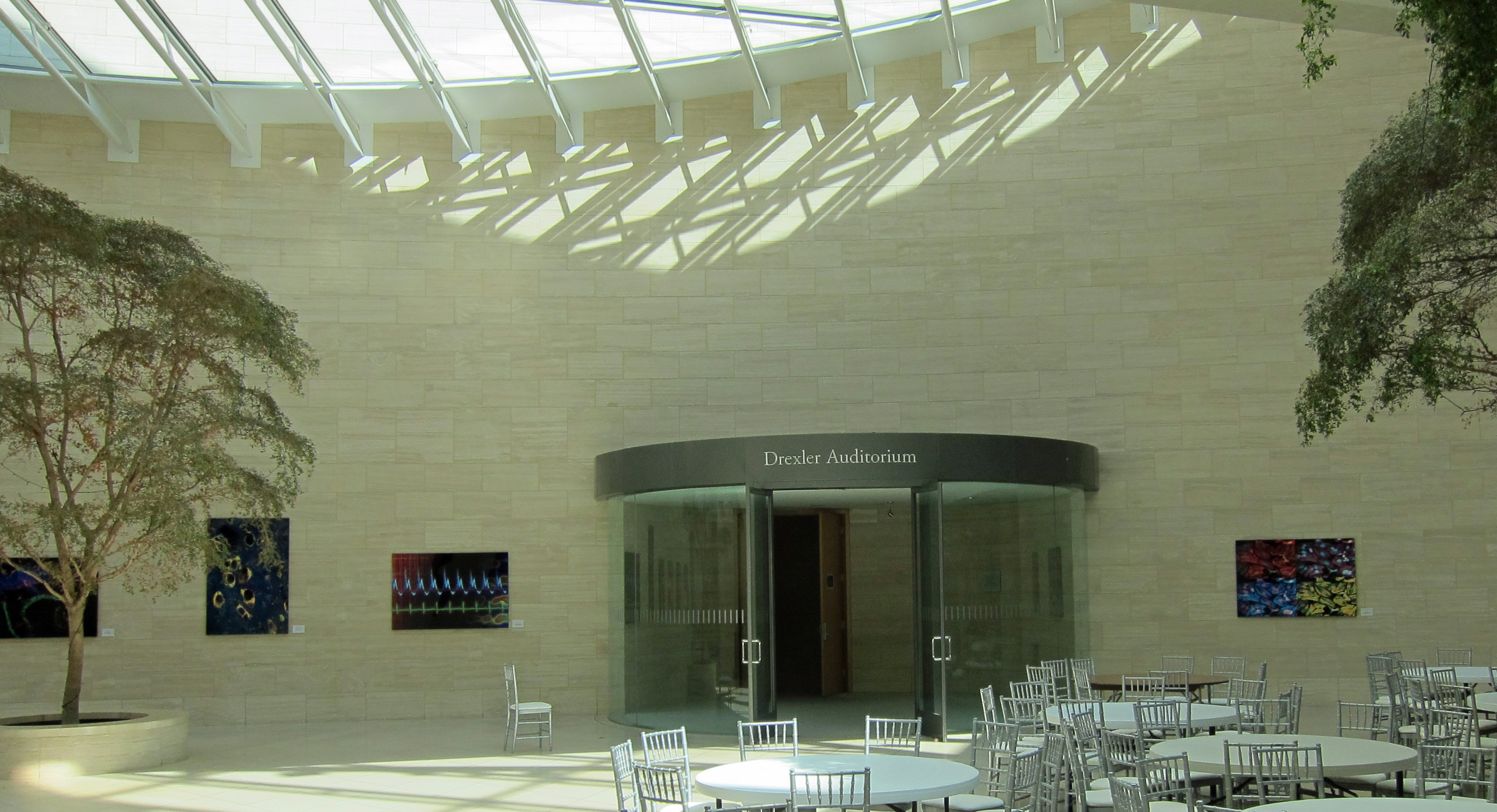
Lobby entrance to Drexler Auditorium, in the Administrative Building

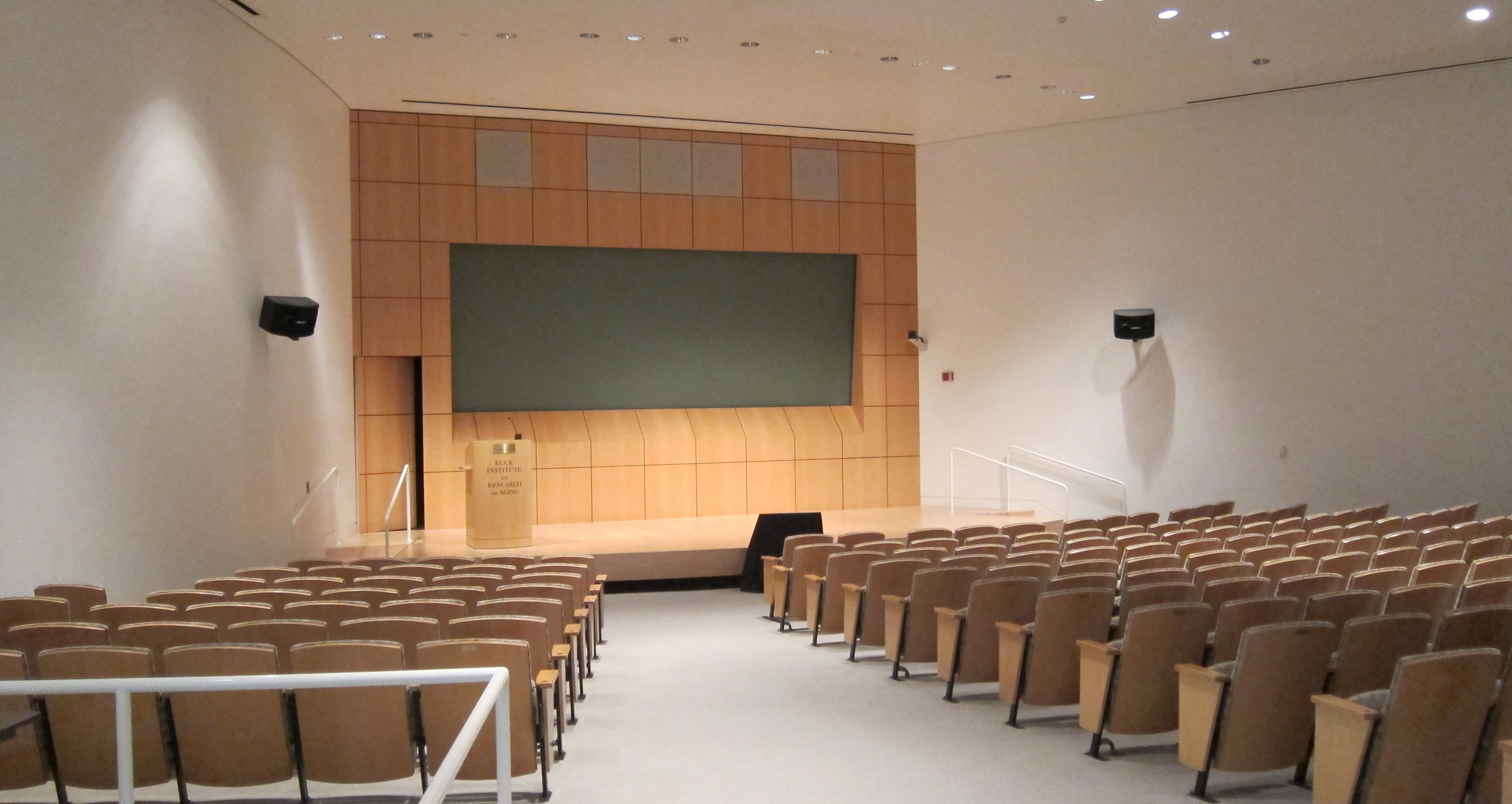
Inside Drexler Auditorium, in the Administrative Building
