= Elmezzi Graduate School of Molecular Medicine =

Private graduate college in Manhasset, New York, US

- Former names: Picower Graduate School of Molecular Medicine, North Shore LIJ Graduate School of Molecular Medicine
- Established: 1994
- Location: Manhasset, New York, US

The Elmezzi Graduate School of Molecular Medicine is a private graduate college in Manhasset, New York, associated with Northwell Health and the Feinstein Institutes for Medical Research. It offers a three year PhD degree program in Molecular Medicine for physicians who want to study the root causes of disease and use their research to design diagnostic and therapeutic solutions.

== History ==
The school was chartered in 1994 by the Picower Institute. In 2001, the school was acquired by the North Shore-LIJ Institute for Medical Research and revived as the North Shore LIJ Graduate School of Molecular Medicine. Its name changed again in 2008 to the Elmezzi Graduate School of Molecular Medicine after a $15 million donation from the Thomas and Jeanne Elmezzi Private Foundation. In 2019, the school received another gift from the foundation, this time a $10 million endowment.

As of 2020, the school had graduated over 41 students.

== Tuition ==
Elmezzi Graduate School had a $1 tuition for students in 2024.

== Accreditation ==
Elmezzi Graduate School is accredited by the WASC Senior College and University Commission; and has attained Candidate for Accreditation Status with the Middle States Commission on Higher Education (MSCHE).

== See also ==
- Feinstein Institutes for Medical Research
- Northwell Health
